= St Albans by-election =

St Albans by-election may refer to one several parliamentary by-elections held in England for the House of Commons constituency of St Albans in Hertfordshire:

- 1904 St Albans by-election
- 1919 St Albans by-election
- 1943 St Albans by-election

== See also ==
- St Albans (UK Parliament constituency)
