= William Grimston, 1st Viscount Grimston =

British politician (1684–1756)

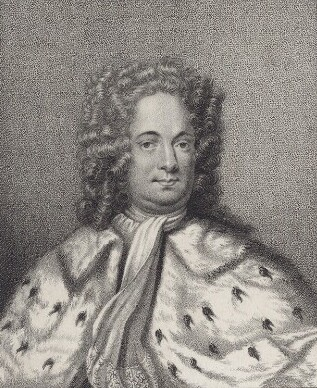
An engraving of Grimston by John Scott

William Grimston, 1st Viscount Grimston (31 December 1684 – 15 October 1756) was a British Whig politician who sat in the House of Commons of Great Britain between 1710 and 1734.

Grimston was born as William Luckyn, the younger son of Sir William Luckyn, 3rd Baronet, and his wife Mary Sherrington. In 1700 he succeeded to the estates, including Gorhambury near St Albans, of his great-uncle Sir Samuel Grimston, 3rd Baronet, of Bradfield, and assumed the surname of Grimston in lieu of Luckyn.

In 1705 he published a play 'The Lawyer's Fortune or Love in a Hollow Tree'. He married Jean Cooke, daughter of James Cooke, on 14 August 1706.

Grimston was returned unopposed as Member of Parliament for St Albans in the 1710 general election and was elected in a contest in 1713. His fortunes at the constituency were affected by the competitive ambitions of Sarah Churchill, Duchess of Marlborough who also had an interest. Although he won the seat in 1715 he was defeated in 1722. In 1719 he was raised to the Peerage of Ireland as Baron Dunboyne and Viscount Grimston. As these were Irish peerages they did not prohibit Grimston from sitting in the British House of Commons. He regained the seat at St Albans in 1727 but lost it again in 1734.

In 1737 he succeeded his elder brother Sir Harbottle Luckyn as fifth Baronet. His feud with the duchess continued until her death as they each tried to prevent the return of each other's candidates at St Albans in subsequent elections. Although Grimston had tried to suppress all copies of his play, in 1736 the Duchess published a version of it with disparaging notes to mock him.

Grimston died in October 1756, aged 72. He and his wife had ten sons and three daughters. He was succeeded in his titles by his son James. Lady Grimston died in 1765.

Parliament of Great Britain
Preceded by John Gape; Joshua Lomax	Member of Parliament for St Albans with John Gape 1710–1713, 1714–1715; William Hale 1713–1714, 1715–1717; Joshua Lomax 1717–1722; 1710–1722	Succeeded by William Gore; William Clayton
Preceded by William Gore; William Clayton	Member of Parliament for St Albans with Caleb Lomax 1727–1730; Thomas Gape 1730–1733; John Merrill 1733–1734; 1727–1734	Succeeded by Sir Thomas Aston; Thomas Ashby
Peerage of Ireland
New creation	Viscount Grimston; 1719–1756	Succeeded by James Grimston
Baronetage of England
Preceded by Harbottle Luckyn	Baronet (of Little Waltham); 1738–1756	Succeeded by James Grimston
