= Stepneth =

Stepneth is an unusual surname. Notable people with this surname include:

- Alban Stepneth (died 1611), English politician
- Robert Stepneth (by 1513–1557), English politician
