= John Gape (1623–1703) =

English politician (1623–1703)

John Gape (5 December 1623 – 20 April 1703) was an English politician. He sat as MP for St. Albans in March 1679.

He was the oldest son of John Gape (died 1625), a tanner and Joan, the daughter of Giles Marston. He was educated at St. Albans Grammar School from 1631. On 9 April 1646, he married Anne (d. 31 December 1682) and they had two sons and four daughters. His eldest son, John Gape, sat as Tory MP for St. Albans between 1701 and 1715.
