= William Hale (British politician) =

British politician (c. 1686–1717)

William Hale (c. 1686 – 2 October 1717) was a British Whig politician.

== Biography ==
Hale was the son of Richard Hale of King's Walden, Hertfordshire (son of William Hale MP), and his wife Elizabeth Meynell (daughter of Isaac Meynell of Meynell Langley, Derbyshire). Richard Hale died in 1689, and in 1690 Elizabeth remarried Robert Cecil MP.

Hale entered Brasenose College, Oxford in 1702, aged 16.

Hale and Sir Cleave More stood as the Whig candidates in Bramber in 1708. They were defeated by two Tories, but petitioned, and were seated on 15 January 1709. Hale supported the naturalization of the Palatines, and voted for the impeachment of Henry Sacheverell. He was elected for St Albans in 1713, and voted against the expulsion of Richard Steele in 1714, but was shortly afterwards unseated on petition. He regained the seat in 1715, holding it until his death on 2 October 1717.

== Family ==
Hale married Catherine Paggen, daughter of Peter Paggen of Wandsworth, Surrey. They had two sons:

- William Hale (died 1741)
- Paggen Hale MP (died 1755)

After Hale's death, Catherine remarried Humphry Morice MP, later Governor of the Bank of England.

Parliament of Great Britain
Preceded by The Viscount Windsor; William Shippen	Member of Parliament for Bramber; 1709–1710; With: Sir Cleave More	Succeeded by The Viscount Windsor; Andrews Windsor
Preceded by John Gape; William Grimston	Member of Parliament for St Albans; 1713–1714; With: William Grimston	Succeeded by John Gape; William Grimston
Preceded by John Gape; William Grimston	Member of Parliament for St Albans; 1715–1717; With: William Grimston	Succeeded by Joshua Lomax; William Grimston
