= John Grimston =

John Grimston may refer to:

- John Grimston, 6th Earl of Verulam, British peer and member of parliament
- John Grimston, 7th Earl of Verulam, British peer
