= John Merrill (MP) =

John Merrill (died 1734), of Lainston, Hampshire, was a British government official and Whig politician who sat in the House of Commons between 1721 and 1734.

Merrill was probably the clerk in the pay office who became deputy to John Grubham Howe, the Paymaster General, by 1710. He was chief clerk to William Pulteney when he was secretary at war from 1715 to 1717. Pulteney said of Merrill ‘He understood the ... revenues ... as well, perhaps better than any man in it … he was the truest friend’.

Pulteney was probably instrumental in Merrill's unopposed return as Member of Parliament for Tregony at a by-election on 7 November 1721 in succession to Daniel Pulteney. Merrill was returned unopposed again at the 1722 general election. He was deputy to Pulteney who was Cofferer of the Household from 1723 to 1725 and became a director of the South Sea Company in 1724. By 1725 Pulteney had gone into opposition. Merrill was not put forward for Tregony at the 1727 general election. He did not re-enter Parliament until a by-election on 23 January 1733, when he was returned as MP for St Albans by the Duchess of Marlborough on Pulteney's recommendation. He did not stand in 1734.

Merrill married Susanna Chudleigh, daughter of Hugh Chudleigh of Westminster He died of gout on 19 December 1734, leaving one son.

Parliament of Great Britain
Preceded by Charles Talbot; Daniel Pulteney	Member of Parliament for Tregony; 1721–1727; With: Charles Talbot 1721-1722; James Cooke 1722-1727	Succeeded by Thomas Smith; John Goddard
Preceded by The Viscount Grimston; Thomas Gape	Member of Parliament for St Albans; 1733–1734; With: The Viscount Grimston	Succeeded by Sir Thomas Aston; Thomas Ashby
