= William Skipwith (died c. 1595) =

English politician

William Skipwith (died c. 1595) was an English politician.

He was a member (MP) of the parliament of England for St. Albans in 1571.
