= Thomas Johnson (died 1569) =

English politician

Thomas Johnson (1519 – July 1569) was an English politician.

He was a member (MP) of the parliament of England for Bossiney in March 1553 and St. Albans in October 1553.
