= Thomas Gape (St Albans MP) =

18th century English politician

Thomas Gape (17 August 1685 – 11 December 1732) was an English Tory politician who sat in the House of Commons.

He was educated at Canterbury, Trinity College, Cambridge and Lincoln's Inn. Both his grandfather and his father had been MP for St Albans. According to the defeated candidate for St Albans at the 1722 election, "the mob was encouraged by Mr. Gape, junior, who, with his drawn sword, began the riot on the election day, and caused the music to play 'The King shall enjoy his own again'."

Gape had been asked by Sarah, Duchess of Marlborough to support her grandson John Spencer as candidate for St Albans. However, Lord Grimston recommended Gape to the St Albans corporation, who adopted Gape unanimously. According to a contemporary account, Grimston and the leading gentlemen of the county attended Gape at the poll on election day, "the town illuminated, bonfires made, and such great rejoicings made there as has not been seen for many years: which shews what regard is paid to those gentlemen who are elected with no other view than to serve their country".

== Notes ==
Parliament of Great Britain
| Preceded by Caleb Lomax; The Viscount Grimston | Member of Parliament for St Albans; 1730–1732; With: The Viscount Grimston | Succeeded by John Merrill; The Viscount Grimston |
