= International Federation of Saddlers' Unions =

The International Federation of Saddlers' Unions (German: Internationalen Vereinigung der Sattler und verwandter Berufsgenossen) was a global union federation uniting trade unions representing workers involved in making saddles and related products.

The federation was founded in 1906, on the initiative of the General German Saddlers' Union. Johannes Sassenbach, former president of the German union, was appointed as its president. In 1921, it merged into the International Union of Boot and Shoe Operatives, Leather, Skin and Hide Workers, which renamed itself as the "International Federation of Boot and Shoe Operatives and Leather Workers".
