= Cyril Dumpleton =

British Labour Party politician (1897–1966)

Cyril Walter Dumpleton JP (25 June 1897 – 1 October 1966) was a British Labour Party politician who served as the Member of Parliament (MP) for the St Albans division of Hertfordshire from 1945 to 1950.

== Early life and family ==
Dumpleton was born in St Albans, the son of Walter Dumpleton, and was educated at an elementary school.

In 1920 he married Louise Lefevre, the daughter of Charles Lefevre from Birmingham. He was a member of the Society of Friends (known as "Quakers").

== Career ==
During World War I, Dumpleton served with the Royal Naval Air Service and the Royal Air Force, and later became manager of a printing and publishing business.

He was a member of St Albans City Council from 1937 to 1950, Mayor of St Albans from 1943 to 1944, and became an Alderman in 1946. He was also a Justice of the Peace for Hertfordshire.

At the 1945 general election he was elected to the House of Commons as the MP for St Albans, defeating the sitting Conservative MP John Grimston. St Albans had been a Conservative seat since 1885, apart from a two-year period 1904 to 1906, and at the last contested election in 1935 the Conservative majority had been 35%. The 1935 and 1945 results were not directly comparable, because the Liberal Party contested the seat in 1945 but not 1935; but Dumpleton's 3.7% majority was vulnerable, and he was defeated at the 1950 general election, when Grimston re-took the seat with a majority of 4.5%.

After his defeat, Dumpleton did not stand for Parliament again. He worked as a public relations executive with the Colonial Development Corporation from 1950 to 1962, and died at Dawlish in Devon in 1966, aged 69.

Parliament of the United Kingdom
Preceded by John Grimston	Member of Parliament for St Albans; 1945 – 1950	Succeeded by John Grimston
