= 1943 St Albans by-election =

UK by-election

The 1943 St Albans by-election was a parliamentary by-election held in England in October 1943 for the UK House of Commons constituency of St Albans in Hertfordshire.

The by-election was held to fill the vacancy caused when the town's Conservative Party Member of Parliament (MP), Sir Francis Fremantle, died suddenly at home on 26 August, aged 71. Fremantle had held the seat since a by-election in 1919.

== Candidates ==
The Conservative Party nominated as its candidate 31-year-old John Grimston, who was then serving in the Royal Air Force. Grimston was the son and heir of the 4th Earl of Verulam, and a cousin of the Assistant Postmaster-General Robert Grimston MP.

In accordance with an electoral truce between the parties in the wartime coalition government, neither the Liberal nor Labour parties nominated a candidate.

However, the dramatist William Douglas-Home, who was then an officer of the Royal Armoured Corps and an opponent of the policy of requiring the unconditional surrender of Nazi Germany, announced that he would stand as an independent candidate.

Polling day (if a vote was needed) was set for 14 October.

Nominations closed on 5 October, when Douglas-Home abandoned his plans to stand, because the necessary permission from the Army Council had not been received, despite an application having been made on 22 September. However, a statement from the Army Council said that permission had been granted that afternoon, and blamed the delay on Douglas-Home not marking the application as urgent. Douglas-Home's agent R. T. A. Cornwell was unable to contact the would-be candidate to let him know that permission had finally been granted, because Douglas-Home was away on "some protracted military exercise". He had come up to London in a torn battledress in the morning, and had left after announcing his withdrawal.

== Result ==
As the only candidate, Grimston was returned unopposed. He held the seat for only two years, until his defeat at the 1945 general election by the Labour candidate Cyril Dumpleton. However, he regained the seat in 1950, and held it until he retired from the House of Commons at the 1959 general election. He succeeded to the peerage the following year as the 6th Earl of Verulam on the death of his elder brother.

== See also ==
- List of United Kingdom by-elections
- St Albans constituency
- 1919 St Albans by-election
- 1904 St Albans by-election
