= Victor Goodhew =

British politician (1919–2006)

Sir Victor Goodhew

Member of Parliament for St Albans
- In office 8 October 1959 – 13 May 1983
- Preceded by: John Grimston
- Succeeded by: Peter Lilley

Personal details
- Born: Victor Henry Goodhew; 30 November 1919 London, England
- Died: 11 October 2006 (aged 86) Ascot, England
- Party: Conservative
- Spouses: Sylvia Johnson (m. 1940, divorced) Suzanne Gordon-Burge (m. 1951; div. 1972) Eva Rittinghausen (m. 1972; div. 1981)
- Children: 2 (by Johnson)
- Awards: Knight Bachelor (1982)

Military service
- Allegiance: United Kingdom
- Branch/service: Royal Air Force
- Years of service: 1939–1946
- Rank: Squadron leader
- Unit: 6th Airborne Division
- Commands: Airborne Radar Unit

Sir Victor Henry Goodhew (30 November 1919 – 11 October 2006) was a British Conservative politician. He served as Member of Parliament (MP) for St Albans for 24 years, from 1959 to 1983, and was an early member of the Conservative Monday Club. Although he held right-wing views—he supported hanging, supported Enoch Powell's views on immigration, and supported closer links with the white regimes in Rhodesia and South Africa—he served as a government whip under Edward Heath in the early 1970s. His later career was blighted by ill health.

== Early life ==
Born in London, he was educated at Rokeby School and King's College School, and then articled to a chartered accountant, and joined the RAF Volunteer Reserve in 1938, before he qualified. He was called up to serve in the Royal Air Force from the outbreak of the Second World War in 1939. After serving as an operations room controller and radar controller, he became commander of the Airborne Radar Unit attached to the 6th Airborne Division, and was promoted to Squadron Leader in 1945. He was demobilised in 1946, and became a director of the family company.

== In politics ==
Goodhew served as a councillor on the Westminster City Council from 1953 to 1959, and for Cities of London and Westminster on the London County Council from 1958 to 1961. He contested the parliamentary seat of Paddington North for the Conservative Party in the 1955 general election, but was unable to unseat the Labour incumbent, Ben Parkin. He was shortlisted in 1957 as a prospective candidate for Warwick and Leamington, the seat vacated by the retirement of Prime Minister Anthony Eden, but Sir John Hobson was selected ahead of him. He finally beat William Rees-Mogg to secure selection for the safer seat in St Albans in Hertfordshire, where he was elected Member of Parliament at the general election in October 1959.

In Parliament, Goodhew served as Parliamentary Private Secretary to Ian Orr-Ewing, Civil Lord of the Admiralty, from 1962 to 1963, and then as PPS to Tam Galbraith, Joint Parliamentary Secretary for the Ministry of Transport, from 1963 to 1964. The Conservatives were in opposition from 1964 to 1970. Edward Heath became leader of the Conservatives in 1965. Heath and Goodhew held opposite views on Africa, and it seemed that Goodhew's career had little prospect of advancement.

Goodhew was an early member (1962) of the Conservative Monday Club, formed to combat the influence of the Bow Group on the Government's African policies. He took part, with four other MPs, in a Club public meeting in January 1962 which affirmed support for Sir Roy Welensky and the Central African Federation, and Rhodesia, and criticised the policies of the then Colonial Secretary, Iain Macleod. In 1970, the Club held a 'Law and Liberty' May Day rally in Trafalgar Square in answer to the "Stop the Seventy Tour" campaign designed to stop the all-white South African cricket tour. Several of the club's MPs spoke, including Victor Goodhew.

When the Conservatives returned to power in 1970, Heath appointed Goodhew as an Assistant Government Whip in June 1970, and he was promoted to a full government whip, as a Lord Commissioner of the Treasury, in October 1970. He suffered a heart attack in October 1973 and had coronary bypass surgery; he resigned his post as a whip on medical advice. However, he went on to serve as a Member of the Speaker's Panel of Chairmen from 1975 to 1983, and on the Select committee for House of Commons Services from 1978 to 1983. He was a House of Commons Commissioner from 1979 to 1983, Joint Secretary to the 1922 Committee from 1979 to 1983, and was Vice-Chairman of the Conservative Defence Committee from 1974 to 1983. He was made a Knight Bachelor in 1982. He steered a Private Member's Bill to the statute book, to allow "death-bed" marriages to take place outside licensed premises. After another heart attack and further coronary bypass surgery in 1981, he stood down at the 1983 general election.

== Family ==
He was the son of Rudolph Goodhew of Mannings Heath, Sussex. His family owed a chain of restaurants. He was married and divorced three times. He first married Sylvia Johnson in 1940, but divorced. He then married Suzanne Gordon-Burge in 1951, but divorced again in 1972. Later that year he married Eva Rittinghausen, a Canadian and former girlfriend of Canadian prime minister Pierre Trudeau, but was divorced a third time in 1981. He was survived by his son, from his first marriage; his daughter, also from his first marriage, pre-deceased him.

He died in Ascot.

Parliament of the United Kingdom
Preceded by John Grimston	Member of Parliament for St Albans; 1959–1983	Succeeded by Peter Lilley
