= Dutch Association of Railway and Tramway Employees =

Dutch trade union

The Dutch Association of Railway and Tramway Employees (Dutch: Nederlandsche Vereeniging van Spoor- en Tramwegpersoneel, NV) was a trade union representing workers in the rail industry in the Netherlands.

The union was founded in 1886, as the Dutch Association of Railway Officials, operating as a social club for railway workers in more prestigious positions. The Steeds Voornieuw was created as a union for all railway workers, but it operated illegally and was disbanded in 1898. Jan Oudegeest, a member of the executive of the Railway Officials, then took the initiative to transform it into a legal union for all railway workers, the NVSTP. It initially grew rapidly, but lost many of its members after an unsuccessful strike in 1903.

In 1906, the union was a founding affiliate of the Dutch Confederation of Trade Unions. It grew again from 1916, becoming the largest union in the industry, and by 1921, it had 20,784 members. In 1951, it was renamed as the Dutch Transport Workers' Association.

By 1954, the union had 24,306 members, of whom 66% worked on the railways, and the remainder on other forms of transport. At the end of 1955, it merged with the Central Union of Transport Workers, to form the Dutch Transport Workers' Union.

== Presidents ==
1899: Jan Oudegeest
1911: Henk Sneevliet
1912: Petrus Moltmaker
1940:
1945: Godert Joustra
1954: H. J. Kanne
