= John Maynard (MP for St Albans) =

16th-century English politician

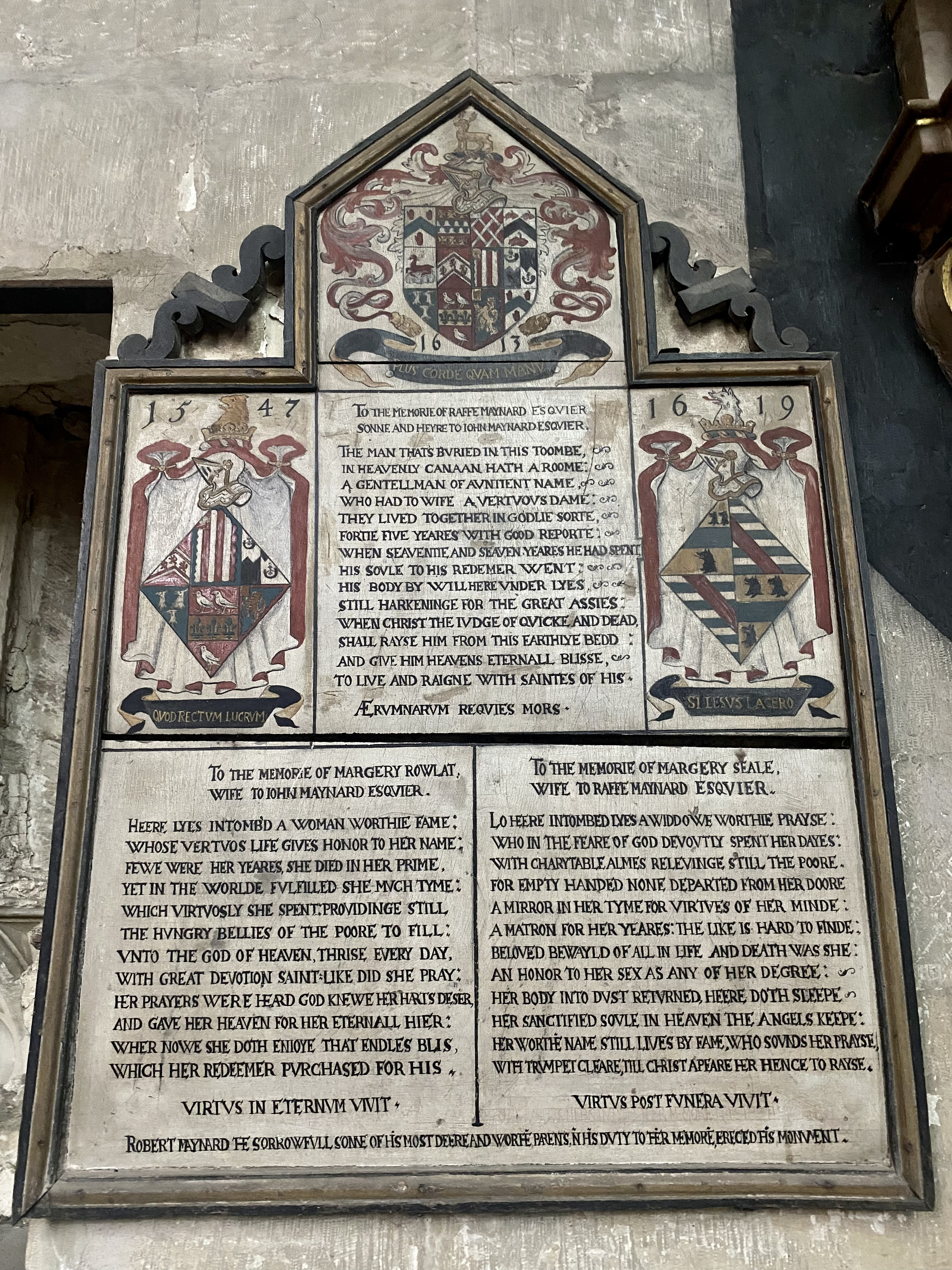
Memorial in St Albans Cathedral to John Maynard's son, Ralph, John's wife Margery Rowlatt and Ralph's wife Margery Seale.

John Maynard (1508/09–1556) was an English politician.

He was a member (MP) of the Parliament of England for St. Albans in October 1553 and November 1554. One of the 39 MPs who absented themselves from Parliament rather than take an oath acknowledging the authority of the Pope, during the reign of Mary I. Married to Margaret Rowlett then Dorothy Perrot. Also related to Eleanor Tuke.

His son by Dorothy Perrot Henry Maynard served as MP for St. Albans in the parliaments of 1586, 1588, 1592, and 1597.
