= Francis Fremantle =

British physician and politician

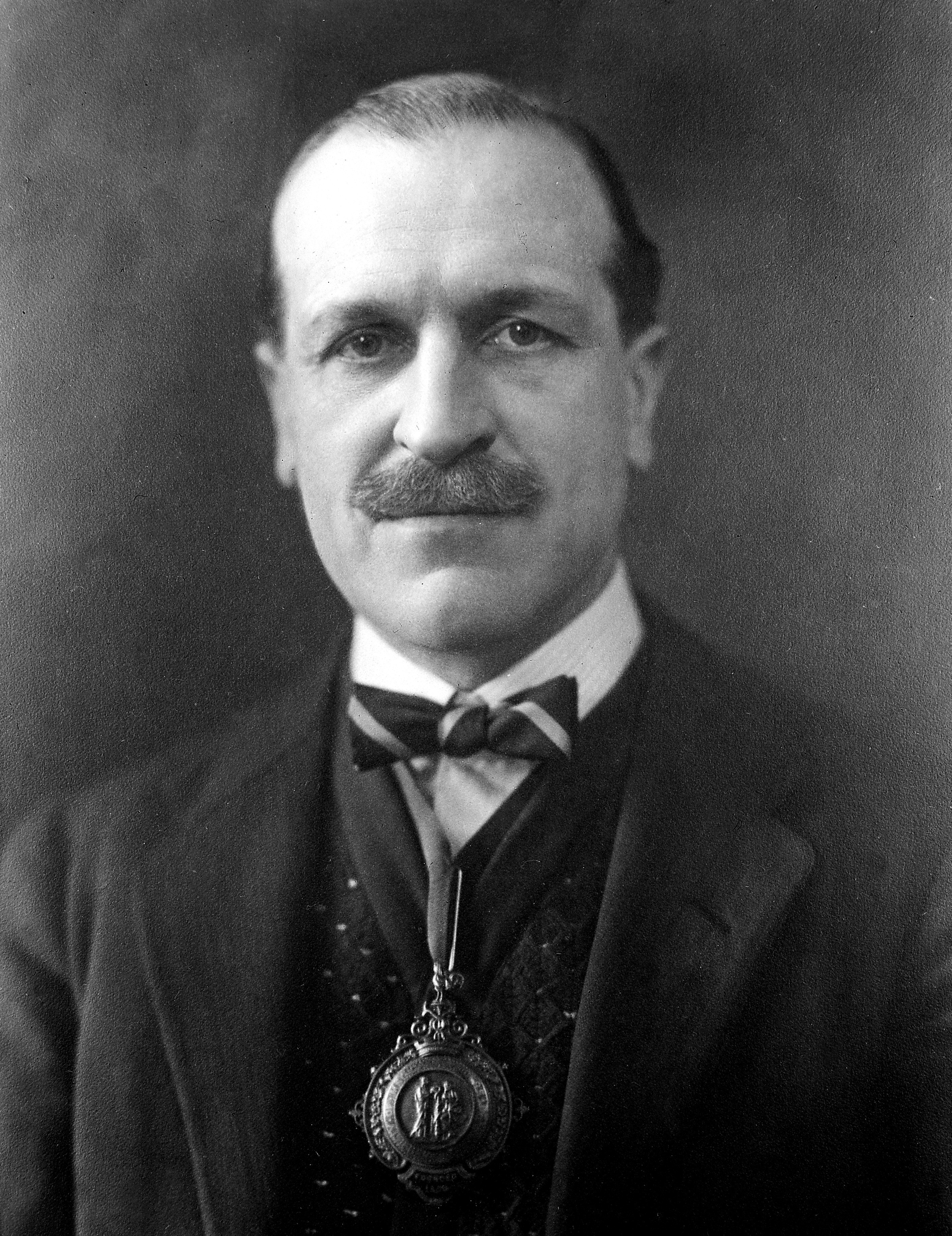
Francis Edward Fremantle

Lieutenant-Colonel Sir Francis Edward Fremantle, OBE, DL, FRCS, FRCP (29 May 1872 – 26 August 1943) was a British physician and Conservative Party politician who served as the Member of Parliament (MP) for St Albans from 1919 until his death.

== Early life ==
F E Fremantle was the fourth son of the Very Rev. William Henry Fremantle, Dean of Ripon. Following education at Eton College and Balliol College, Oxford, he went to study medicine at Guy's Hospital, London. He received his doctorate in 1898.

== Medicine ==
In 1902 he was appointed county medical officer of health for Hertfordshire, a post he held until 1916. He was elected a fellow of the Royal College of Physicians in 1910, and subsequently served on the organisation's council. Fremantle held a commission as a surgeon-captain in the Hertfordshire Yeomanry, and served as a medical officer with the British Army in the Second Boer War. He then travelled to the Punjab, India to work as a plague medical officer from 1903 – 1904. During the First World War he rose to the rank of lieutenant-colonel in the Royal Army Medical Corps, serving in Mesopotamia.

== Politics ==
After the war, Fremantle entered politics. In March 1919 he was elected to the London County Council as a Municipal Reform Party councillor for Dulwich. Later in the year, Hildred Carlile, the Conservative MP for St Albans, resigned from the House of Commons due to ill-health. Fremantle was selected as the Coalition Conservative candidate for the resulting by-election held in December, and was elected despite a strong challenge from the Labour Party.

Fremantle became a frequent speaker in parliament, being recognised as a spokesman for the medical profession, and was chairman of the Parliamentary Medical Committee from 1923 to 1943. He held the St Albans seat for the Conservatives until his death, and was knighted in 1932, for "political and public services". In 1926 he became a Deputy Lieutenant of Hertfordshire.

== Marriage and death ==
In 1905 he married Dorothy Chinnery, and they had one son. He died suddenly at his home, Bedwell Park, near Hatfield in August 1943.

Parliament of the United Kingdom
| Preceded by Hildred Carlile | Member of Parliament for St Albans; 1919 – 1943 | Succeeded by John Grimston |
