= Jan Oudegeest =

Dutch politician

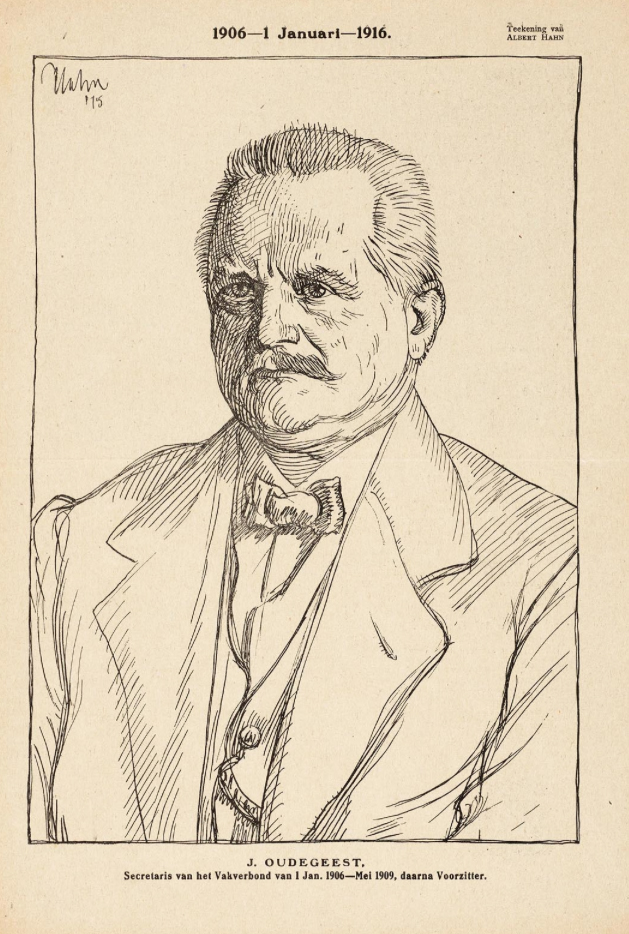

Jan Oudegeest (5 August 1870 – 10 October 1950) was a Dutch trade unionist and politician.

Born in Utrecht, Oudegeest worked on the railways and in 1898 founded the Dutch Association of Railway and Tramway Employees (NV), and became the first union's chair. In this role, he led a major strike in 1903, but afterward decided against strike action. When the Nederlands Verbond van Vakverenigingen was founded in 1906, Oudegeest became its first secretary, and in 1909 he took over as its president, serving until 1919. In this role, Oudegeest was highly critical of the Christian trade unions, believing them to be pro-capitalist.

Oudegeest was a founding member of the International Labour Organization, as well as vice-chair of its administrative council for many years, where he made an unsuccessful attempt to bring the social democratic and Marxist internationals together.

Oudegeest served on the council of Utrecht, and later, on the council of Amsterdam, before winning the 1918 election to the House of Representatives. In 1919, he was a prominent founder of the International Federation of Trade Unions, and served as joint secretary until 1927. That year, he stood down, becoming chair of the Social Democratic Workers' Party, and in 1928 he was also elected to the Senate. He retired from his party post in 1934, and from the Senate in 1936, but remained on the executive of the NV until 1942.

== Personal life ==
He is the father of Corrie de Roos-Oudegeest, who was elected to the House of Representatives in 1956.

Trade union offices
Preceded by ?	President of the Dutch Association of Railway and Tramway Employees; 1899–1911	Succeeded by Henk Sneevliet
Preceded by Henri Polak	President of the Dutch Confederation of Trade Unions; 1909–1919	Succeeded by Roel Stenhuis
Preceded by New position	General Secretary of the International Federation of Trade Unions; 1922–1931; With: Edo Fimmen (1919–1923); Johannes Sassenbach (1922–1927); John W. Brown (1923–1927)	Succeeded by Johannes Sassenbach
