= Caleb Lomax =

British landowner and politician

Caleb Lomax (c. 1695–1730), of Childwick Bury, near St Albans, Hertfordshire, was a British landowner and politician who sat in the House of Commons from 1727 to 1730.

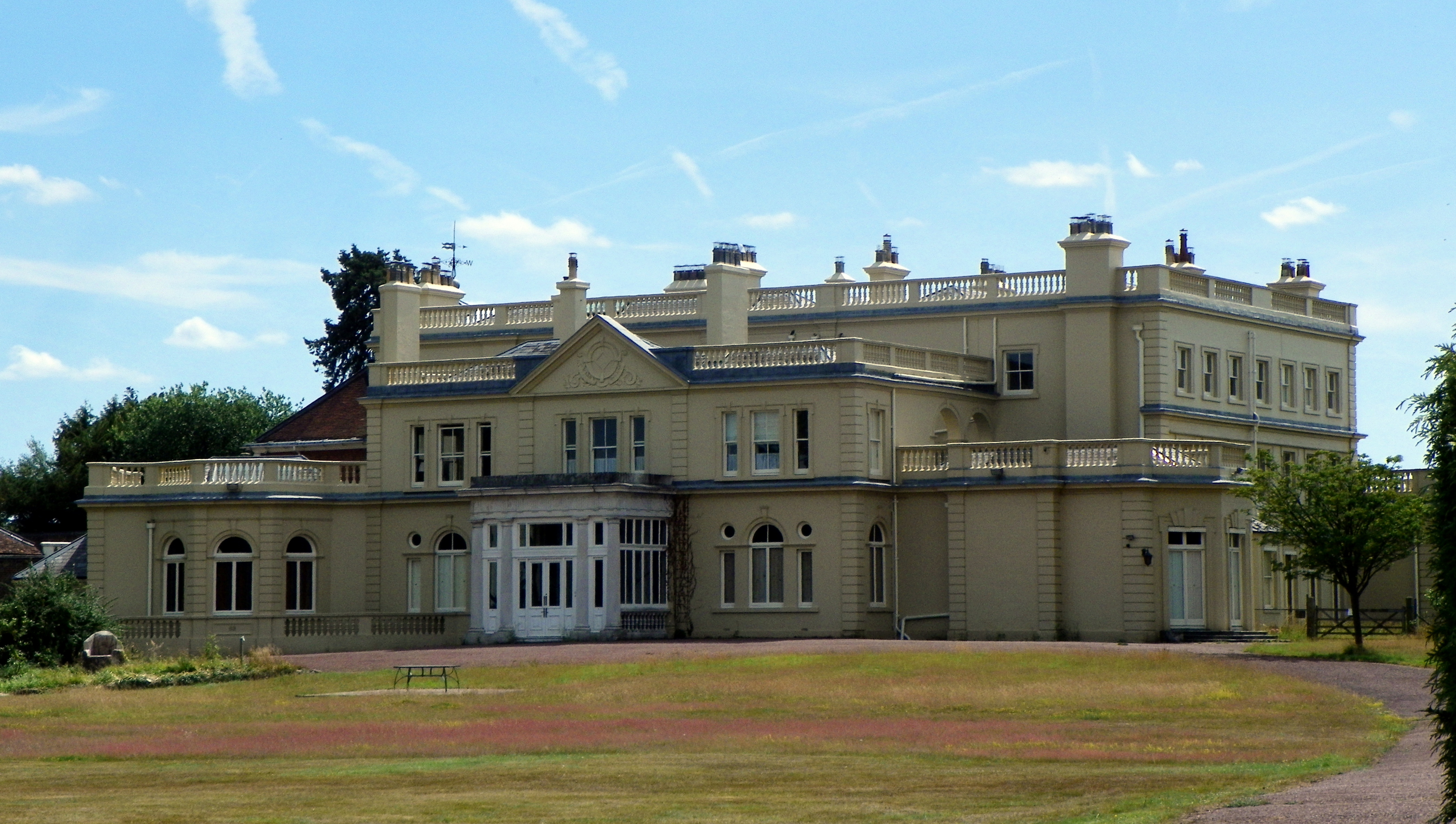
Childwickbury manor house

Lomax was the eldest surviving son of Joshua Lomax MP of Childwick Bury, near St. Albans, Hertfordshire and his wife Ruth Lee, daughter of John Lee of Plaistow, Sussex. He was admitted at Lincoln's Inn on 27 July 1713. In 1724 he succeeded his father to Childwick Bury. He married Mary Rose.

Lomax's electoral influence at St Albans was so strong that Sarah Churchill, Duchess of Marlborough was discouraged from backing her grandson as a candidate there at the 1727 British general election. Lomax was returned as Member of Parliament for St Albans after a contest. He voted for the Government on the civil list arrears in 1729.

Lomax died on 7 March 1730. He had one surviving son Caleb.

Parliament of Great Britain
Preceded by William Gore; William Clayton	Member of Parliament for St Albans; 1727– 1730; With: The Viscount Grimston	Succeeded by The Viscount Grimston; Thomas Gape
