= Milner Gray (politician) =

British politician (1871-1943)

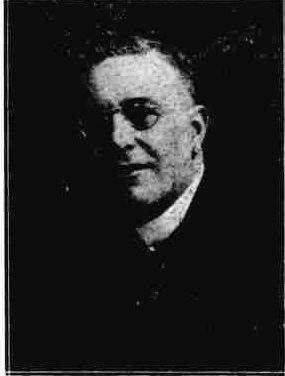

Member of Parliament for Mid Bedfordshire
- In office 30 May 1929 – 7 October 1931
- Preceded by: William Warner
- Succeeded by: Alan Lennox-Boyd

Personal details
- Born: 11 May 1871 Luton, Bedfordshire, England
- Died: 10 April 1943 (aged 71) Wheathampstead, Hertfordshire, England
- Party: Liberal
- Spouse: Elizabeth Eleanor Luck (m. 1902)

Milner Gray CBE (11 May 1871 – 10 April 1943) was a British Liberal politician.

== Family life and business ==
Gray was born in Luton, Bedfordshire, the son of a Baptist Minister, although he himself was a Methodist in religion. He was educated at Greenwich. In 1902, he married Elizabeth Eleanor Luck of Lewisham. They had no children. In business, Gray was Chairman of Frank Harden Ltd of Luton (manufacturers of ladies' hats) and a director of the United Match Industries.

== Politics ==
Gray first tried to enter Parliament in 1911. At the 1918 general election, he contested Wellingborough as a Coalition Liberal, i.e. a supporter of the coalition government between those members of the Liberal Party led by David Lloyd George and the Conservatives; but he lost in a straight fight to Labour. He stood as the Liberal candidate at the December 1919 by-election in St Albans, but he finished in last place, losing his deposit. He was unsuccessful at the 1923 general election at Bedford, where he also stood again without success in 1924. However, he was finally elected as the Liberal MP for Mid Bedfordshire at the 1929 general election. He briefly served as Parliamentary Secretary at the Ministry of Labour in 1931 during the period the Liberal Party supported the National Government led by Ramsay MacDonald. Gray had promoted himself a National Liberal candidate for the 1931 general election although he was never a member of the National Liberal group led by Sir John Simon. Initial indications were that the Conservatives would stand aside for him in 1931 and Gray thought they should but his hopes were soon dashed however, and he was opposed by a Unionist candidate, Alan Lennox-Boyd who also supported the National Government. Gray lost his seat.

In 1934, Gray tried to persuade Lloyd George to take a more active part in leading the party again, inviting him to speak at the annual meeting of the National Liberal Federation (NLF) meeting in Bournemouth, but Lloyd George refused saying the National Liberal Federation had always made him feel like the prodigal son. Gray sought re-election as the Member of Parliament for Mid Bedfordshire at the 1935 general election, but lost to the Conservatives. In 1936, he was elected to serve on the Liberal Party Council.

He attempted to enter Parliament again at a by-election in June 1938 in West Derbyshire, but despite an energetic campaign and his personal qualities as a political speaker, he came bottom of the poll in a three-cornered contest. Perhaps as a consolation for losing his seat in the House of Commons, he was made a CBE in 1937.

== Policy ==
Throughout his career, Gray took a particular interest in foreign affairs, and was strongly in favour of an effective League of Nations and was prominent in highlighting the persecution of the Jews in Nazi Germany. In November 1938, he led a deputation from the Liberal Party Organisation to 10 Downing Street to deliver a resolution calling for government action and urging more generous offers of political asylum. Later that month, Gray was also one of a number of signatories – politicians, artists, writers etc. – to a letter to The Times objecting to the persecution of Jews in Germany. On other policy matters, Gray was regarded as an authority on employment issues, presumably one result of his experience at the Ministry of Labour and in 1933, he chaired a Liberal Party policy committee on unemployment insurance.

== Death ==
Gray was chairman of the executive of the Liberal Party Organisation for six years and was a member of the Council of the Liberal Party at the time of his death. He died at his home in Wheathampstead in Hertfordshire.

Parliament of the United Kingdom
| Preceded by William Warner | Member of Parliament for Mid Bedfordshire; 1929–1931 | Succeeded by Alan Lennox-Boyd |
Party political offices
| Preceded by Ronald Walker | Chairman of the National Liberal Federation; 1934–1936 | Succeeded by Harry Spencer |
| Preceded by Harry Spencer | Chairman of the Liberal Party; 1936–1946 | Succeeded by Philip Fothergill |
