= Johannes Sassenbach =

German trade union leader and politician

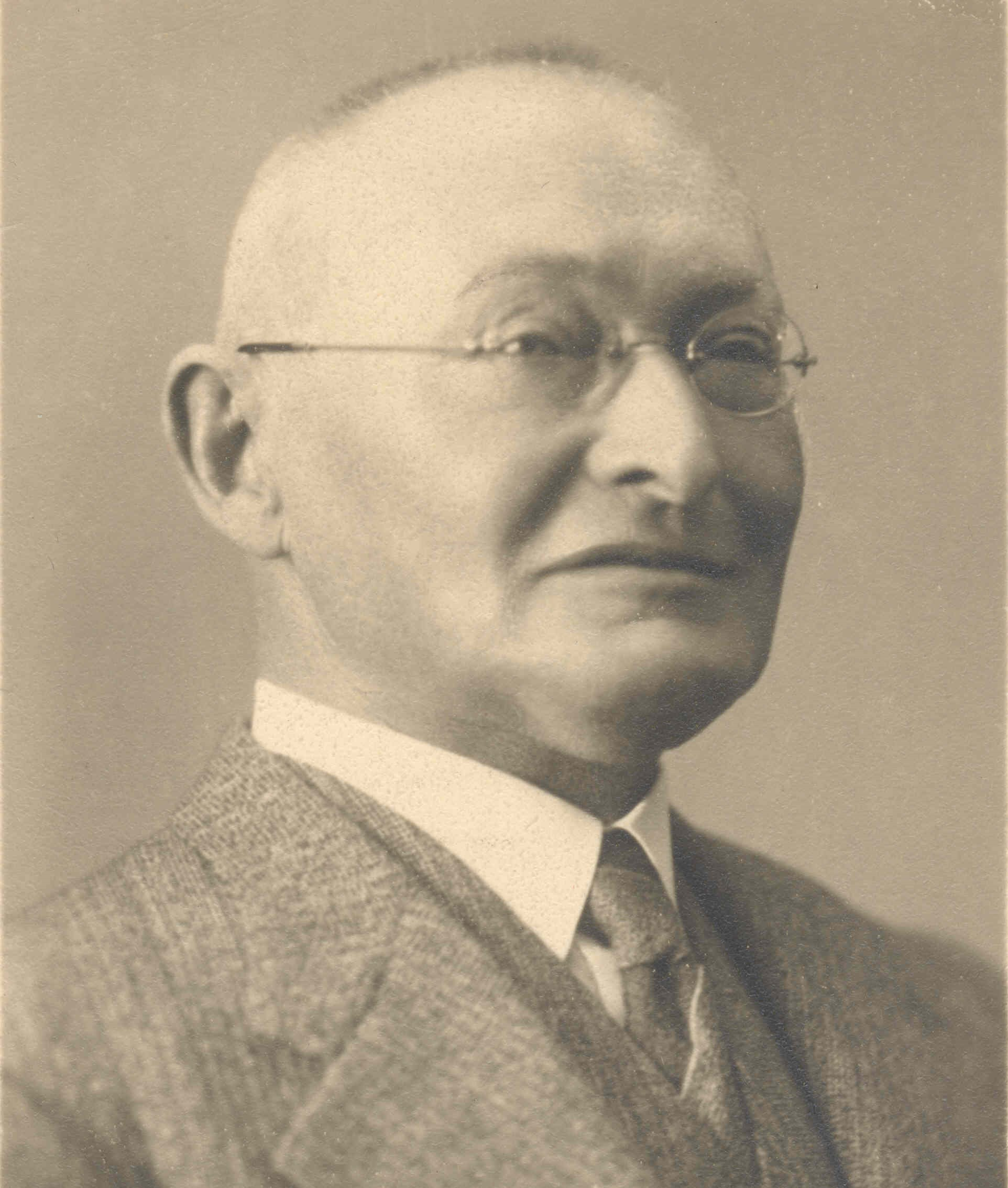
Sassenbach in 1920

Johannes Sassenbach (12 October 1866 – 19 November 1940) was a German trade union leader and politician.

Born near Wipperfürth, Sassenbach's father was a saddler and ran a pub. Johannes also completed an apprenticeship as a saddler, and he became interested in trade unionism, founding a branch of the Saddlers' Union in Cologne in 1889. In 1890, he joined the Social Democratic Party, and in 1891, he was elected as chair of the Saddlers' Union, also serving as editor of its journal.

To take up his union posts, Sassenbach moved to Berlin. There, he co-founded a co-operative of military saddlers, and served as its manager. In 1895, he organised the first conference of socialist academics, founding the Sozialistischer Akademiker journal, and editing it for a year, then editing Neuland until 1898. He also co-founded and managed a trade union house in Berlin. In 1906, the International Federation of Saddlers' Unions was created, and Sassenbach served as its general secretary.

In 1902, Sassenbach was elected to the executive of the General Commission of German Trade Unions, serving until 1922. He also won election to Berlin City Council in 1905, serving until 1919, and was a co-founder of the country's socialist youth movement.

In 1919, Sassenbach was appointed as attache to the German embassy in Rome, then from 1920 to 1923, he chaired the Berlin school for continuing education. During this period, he was centrally involved in integrating the German trade union movement into the International Federation of Trade Unions (IFTU), serving as joint secretary from 1922, then general secretary from 1927 until 1931. He then largely retired to Frankfurt am Main, but remained involved in the local Saddlers' Union. The Nazi government confiscated his library and imprisoned him twice before his death in 1940.

Trade union offices
Preceded by Edo Fimmen and Jan Oudegeest	General Secretary of the International Federation of Trade Unions; 1922–1931; With: Edo Fimmen (1922–1923); Jan Oudegeest (1922–1927); John W. Brown (1923–1927)	Succeeded by Walter Schevenels
