= St Albans (constituency) =

Parliamentary constituency in the United Kingdom, 1801–1852 & 1885 onwards

Coordinates: 51.740°N 0.337°W

- County constituency for the House of Commons
- Interactive map of boundaries since 2024
- Location within the East of England
- County: Hertfordshire
- Electorate: 70,881 (March 2020)
- Major settlements: Bricket Wood, How Wood, Park Street, St Albans

Current constituency
- Created: 1885
- Member of Parliament: Daisy Cooper (Liberal Democrat)
- Seats: One
- Created from: Hertfordshire

1554–1852
- Seats: Two
- Type of constituency: Borough constituency
- Created from: Hertfordshire
- Replaced by: Hertfordshire

St Albans is a constituency (Note: A borough constituency (for the purposes of election expenses and type of returning officer).) in Hertfordshire represented in the House of Commons of the UK Parliament since 2019 by Daisy Cooper, a Liberal Democrat. (Note: As with all constituencies, its registered electors elect one Member of Parliament (MP) by the first past the post system of election at least every five years.)

This article also describes the eponymous parliamentary borough (1554–1852), consisting only of the city of St Albans, which elected two Members of Parliament (MPs) by the bloc vote system.

== Constituency profile ==
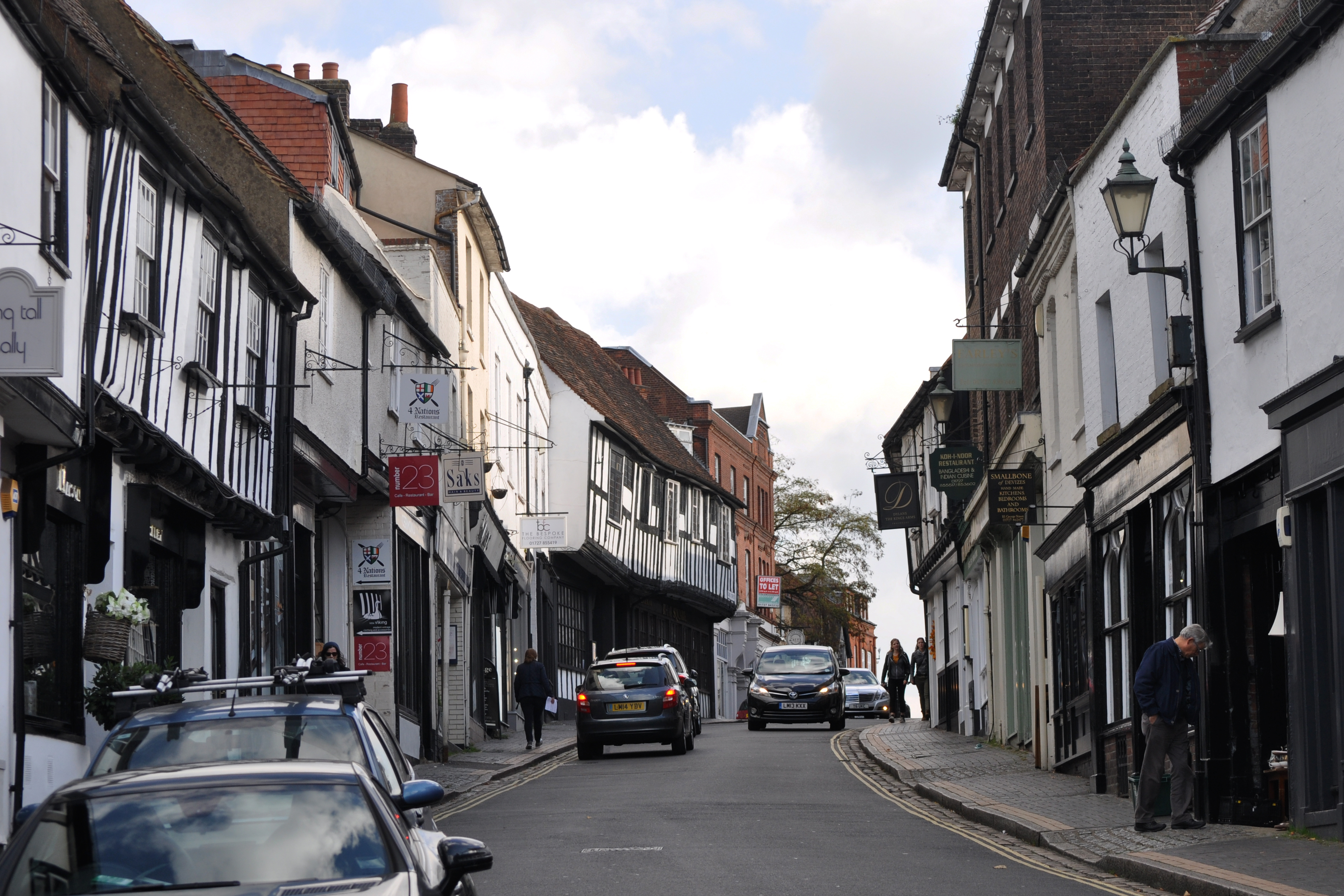
George Street, St Albans

St Albans is a constituency in Hertfordshire in the East of England. It covers the city of St Albans and the outlying villages of London Colney, How Wood and Bricket Wood.

St Albans is an ancient cathedral city and is sometimes considered part of the London commuter belt; it is located around 19 miles (31 km) north-west of the centre of the capital. Verulamium, one of the largest towns in Roman Britain, was located where St Albans currently stands. St Albans was a rural market town until the late Victorian era, after which it underwent significant suburban growth to accommodate the redistribution of people away from London. The city is highly-affluent with low levels of deprivation, and the average house price is nearly double the UK average.

St Albans has low proportions of young adults and retirees and a large population of middle-aged adults. Residents have high rates of homeownership and very high levels of income. The child poverty rate is less than half the overall UK figure. Residents are generally well-educated and a high proportion work in the retail, business administration and science sectors. The percentage claiming unemployment benefits is low. White people made up 81% of the population at the 2021 census, with Asians being the largest ethnic minority group at 10%.

At the local council level, almost all seats in this constituency are represented by Liberal Democrats. Voters in St Albans strongly supported remaining in the European Union in the 2016 referendum; an estimated 63% voted to remain compared to the UK-wide figure of 48%.

== History ==
=== Up to 1852 ===
The Parliamentary Borough of St Albans was represented by two MPs in the House of Commons of England from 1554 to 1707, then of the House of Commons of Great Britain from 1707 to 1800, and finally in the House of Commons of the Parliament of the United Kingdom from 1801 onwards, until it was disenfranchised as a result of electoral corruption in 1852.

=== 1885 to date ===
Results of all deposit-keeping candidates since 1983 in their bid be the MP for St Albans (UK House of Commons).

The constituency was re-established in an enlarged form by the Redistribution of Seats Act 1885 (which followed on from the Third Reform Act) as one of four Divisions of the abolished three-member Parliamentary County of Hertfordshire, and was formally named as the Mid or St Albans Division of Hertfordshire.

Political history before 1997

Until 1997 the seat was held by one Conservative or another save for two years in the very early 20th century following a by-election victory by the Liberal Party under the leadership of Henry Campbell-Bannerman, and later – from 1945 – for five years under Labour's landslide Attlee ministry.

Political history since 1997

The seat swung towards the left wing on boundary changes effective in 1997, and the founding of the New Labour movement which sought public sector reform and investment with expansion based on international investor-friendly economic growth. The seat followed its projections in line with the large swing led by Tony Blair, to see it return to a Labour politician. Results, except for a strong Tory surge in 2015 were closer than the 1979–1992 Tory victories forming a complex three-party contest (including the Liberal Democrats) – only once did another candidate in this time reach the deposit (politics)-retaining threshold of 5% of the vote, UKIP at its 2015 peak.

Despite the former Labour MP for the seat, Kerry Pollard, standing there in 2005, 2015 and 2017, he fell varyingly short. The 2019 vote share fell to below that seen in the 1980s, locally, for the party's candidate – the party leader was to the left of the party, Jeremy Corbyn.

The seat has had great fluctuation in Liberal Democrat vote share: 2001 and 2015 were ebbs at below 20% of the vote; in 2010 and 2017 the Liberal Democrat candidate, promisingly, took 4.4% and 10.7% less than the winning Conservative. Liberal Democrat Daisy Cooper went on to win in 2019. She became first member of a liberal party to represent the constituency since John Bamford Slack in early 1900s.

In December 2023, the Labour Party included the seat in its published list of 211 non-battleground seats, suggesting they did not see it as winnable.

=== Prominent members ===
The noble and local landowning Grimston family have produced nine members throughout the seat's history. The three first heirs to the Earldom of Verulam have won election in the seat – the latest MP from the family was John Grimston who later became the 6th Earl (died 1973).

Sir Hildred Carlile (died 1942) was a textiles entrepreneur and generous benefactor of Bedford College, University of London.

Francis Fremantle was chairman of the Parliamentary Medical Committee from 1923 to 1943.

Peter Lilley was a frontbench minister in government from 1992 until 1997, the Secretary of State for Social Security, after two years as Secretary of State for Trade and Industry.

== Boundaries and boundary changes (since 1885) ==
=== Historic ===
==== 1885–1918 ====
- The Municipal Borough of St Albans;
- The Sessional Divisions of Barnet and St Albans; and
- Parts of the Sessional Divisions of Watford, Hertford and Dacorum.

As well from the Borough of St Albans, the seat included the towns of Harpenden, Hatfield and Chipping Barnet.

==== 1918–1945 ====
- The Municipal Borough of St Albans;
- The Urban Districts of Barnet and East Barnet Valley;
- The Rural Districts of Barnet and Hatfield; and
- The Rural District of St Albans civil parishes of Sandridge Rural, St Michael Rural, St Peter Rural, and St Stephen.

North-western parts, including Harpenden, transferred to the new Hemel Hempstead Division. South-western corner (Aldenham) transferred to Watford.

==== 1945–1950 ====
- The Municipal Borough of St Albans;
- The Urban District of Welwyn Garden City;
- The Rural District of Hatfield; and
- The Rural District of St Albans civil parishes of Sandridge Rural, St Michael Rural, St Peter Rural, and St Stephen.

The Urban Districts of Barnet and East Barnet (formerly East Barnet Valley) and the Rural District of Elstree (formerly Barnet) formed the new Barnet Division. The Urban District of Welwyn Garden City had been formed as a separate local authority which had previously been partly in the Hitchin Division. Other marginal changes as a result of changes to local authority boundaries.

==== 1950–1955 ====
- The Municipal Borough of St Albans;
- The Urban District of Welwyn Garden City;
- The Rural District of Welwyn; and
- The Rural District of St Albans civil parishes of Sandridge Rural, St Michael Rural, St Peter Rural, St Stephen, and Wheathampstead.

The Rural District of Welwyn was transferred from Hitchin and the parish of Wheathampstead from Hemel Hempstead. The Rural District of Hatfield was transferred to Barnet.

==== 1955–1974 ====
- The Municipal Borough of St Albans; and
- The Rural District of St Albans civil parishes of Colney Heath, London Colney, Sandridge Rural, St Michael Rural, St Stephen, and Wheathampstead.

The Urban District of Welwyn Garden City and the Rural District of Welwyn were transferred to Hertford. (The parish of St Peter Rural had been divided into the parishes of Colney Heath and London Colney).

==== 1974–1983 ====
- The Municipal Borough of St Albans;
- The Urban District of Harpenden; and
- The Rural District of St Albans civil parishes of Harpenden Rural, Redbourn, St Michael Rural, Sandridge, and Wheathampstead.

Boundaries moved northwards: Harpenden U.D. and the parishes of Harpenden Rural and Redbourn were transferred in from Hemel Hempstead. The parishes of Colney Heath, London Colney and St Stephen were transferred out to form part of the new constituency of South Hertfordshire.

==== 1983–1997 ====
- The District of St Albans wards of Ashley, Batchwood, Clarence, Colney Heath, Cunningham, Harpenden East, Harpenden North, Harpenden South, Harpenden West, Marshalswick North, Marshalswick South, Redbourn, St Peter's, Sandridge, Sopwell, and Verulam.

Minor changes: Colney Heath transferred from abolished South Hertfordshire; Wheathampstead transferred to Welwyn Hatfield.

==== 1997–2010 ====
- The District of St Albans wards of Ashley, Batchwood, Clarence, Colney Heath, Cunningham, London Colney, Marshalswick North, Marshalswick South, Park Street, St Peter's, St Stephen's, Sopwell, and Verulam; and
- The District of Three Rivers ward of Bedmond.

Moved southwards again, gaining London Colney from Hertsmere, Park Street and St Stephen's from Watford and the Three Rivers District ward of Bedmond from South West Hertfordshire. Northern parts, including Harpenden, formed part of the new constituency of Hitchin and Harpenden.

==== 2010–2024 ====
Map of boundaries 2010–2024

- The City of St Albans wards of Ashley, Batchwood, Clarence, Colney Heath, Cunningham, London Colney, Marshalswick North, Marshalswick South, Park Street, St Peter's, St Stephen, Sopwell, and Verulam; and
- The Three Rivers District ward of Bedmond and Primrose Hill.

Marginal adjustments to bring the parliamentary boundaries in line with those of local government wards, which had changed since the 1995 review.

=== Current ===
Further to the 2023 review of Westminster constituencies, which came into effect for the 2024 general election, the composition of the constituency was unchanged except for the small part in the District of Three Rivers, which was transferred to South West Hertfordshire.

Following a local government boundary review which came into effect in May 2022, the constituency now comprises the following wards of the City of St Albans from the 2024 general election:

- Batchwood; Bernards Heath; Clarence; Colney Heath; Cunningham; Hill End; London Colney; Marshalswick East & Jersey Farm (majority); Marshalswick West (nearly all); Park Street; St Peters; St Stephen (nearly all); Sopwell; Verulam (nearly all).

The seat is in Hertfordshire, England. Specifically, it comprises the cathedral city of St Albans and some of the surrounding countryside, mainly to the south of the city.

Neighbouring seats, clockwise from north, are: Harpenden and Berkhamsted, Welwyn Hatfield, Hertsmere, South West Hertfordshire.

== Members of Parliament ==
=== MPs 1553–1640 ===
| Parliament | First member | Second member |
|---|---|---|
| 1553 (Oct) | John Maynard | Thomas Johnson |
| 1554 (Apr) | Thomas Wendy | Oliver Starkey |
| 1554 (Nov) | John Maynard | Oliver Starkey |
| 1555 | John Astley | Robert Stepneth |
| 1558 | Henry Heydon | Francis Southwell |
| 1559 (Jan) | Christopher Smith | John Dodmer |
| 1562–3 | Robert Wroth | Roger Carew |
| 1571 | William Skipwith | George Ferrers |
| 1572 (Apr) | Henry Cocke | Charles Smythe |
| 1584 | Henry Maynard | Humphrey Coningsby |
| 1586 (Oct) | Henry Maynard | Humphrey Coningsby |
| 1588 (Oct) | Henry Maynard | Humphrey Coningsby |
| 1593 | Henry Maynard | Humphrey Coningsby |
| 1597 (Oct) | Henry Maynard | Humphrey Coningsby |
| 1601 | Francis Bacon, sat for Ipswich, replaced Nov 1601 by Henry Frowick | Adolphus Carey |
| 1604 | Sir Francis Bacon, sat for Ipswich repl. by Tobie Matthew | Adolphus Carey |
| 1610 | Sir Thomas Parry | Sir Henry Helmes |
| 1614 | Sir Francis Bacon, sat for Cambridge University repl. by Thomas Perient | Henry Finch |
| 1620 | Sir Thomas Richardson | Robert Shute |
| 1621 | Sir Thomas Richardson | Henry Meautys |
| 1624 | Sir Arthur Capell | Sir John Luke |
| 1625 | Sir Charles Morrison, 1st Baronet | Sir John Luke |
| 1626 | Sir Charles Morrison, 1st Baronet | Sir Edward Goring |
| 1628 | Sir John Jennings | Robert Kirkham |
| 1629–1640 | No Parliaments summoned | |

=== MPs 1640–1852 ===
| Year | First member | First party | Second member | Second party |
|---|---|---|---|---|
| April 1640 | Richard Coningsby | | Sir John Jennings | Parliamentarian |
| November 1640 | Edward Wingate | Parliamentarian | Sir John Jennings | Parliamentarian |
| 1642 | Edward Wingate | Parliamentarian | Richard Jennings | Parliamentarian |
| December 1648 | Wingate and Jennings excluded in Pride's Purge – both seats vacant | | | |
| 1653 | St Albans was unrepresented in the Barebones Parliament | | | |
| 1654 | Alban Cox | | St Albans had only one seat in the First and Second Parliaments of the Protectorate | |
| 1656 | Alban Cox | | St Albans had only one seat in the First and Second Parliaments of the Protectorate | |
| January 1659 | Alban Cox | | Richard Jennings | |
| May 1659 | Not represented in the restored Rump | | | |
| April 1660 | William Foxwist | | Richard Jennings | |
| 1661 | Thomas Arris | | Richard Jennings | |
| 1668 | Thomas Arris | | Samuel Grimston | |
| February 1679 | Sir Thomas Blount | | John Gape | |
| August 1679 | Sir Thomas Blount | | Samuel Grimston | |
| 1685 | Captain George Churchill | Tory | Thomas Docwra | |
| 1689 | Captain George Churchill | Tory | Sir Samuel Grimston | |
| January 1701 | Captain George Churchill | Tory | Joshua Lomax | |
| March 1701 | Captain George Churchill | Tory | John Gape | Tory |
| 1705 | Captain George Churchill | Tory | Admiral Henry Killigrew | Whig |
| 1708 | John Gape | Tory | Joshua Lomax | |
| 1710 | John Gape | Tory | William Grimston | Whig |
| 1713 | William Hale | Whig | William Grimston | Whig |
| 1714 | John Gape | Tory | William Grimston | Whig |
| 1715 | William Hale | Whig | William Grimston | Whig |
| 1717 | Joshua Lomax | | William Grimston | Whig |
| 1722 | William Gore | | William Clayton | |
| 1727 | The Viscount Grimston | Whig | Caleb Lomax | |
| 1730 by-election | The Viscount Grimston | Whig | Thomas Gape | Tory |
| 1733 by-election | The Viscount Grimston | Whig | John Merrill | |
| 1734 | Sir Thomas Aston | | Thomas Ashby | |
| 1741 | James West | | Thomas Ashby | |
| 1743 by-election | James West | | Hans Stanley | |
| 1747 | James West | | Sir Peter Thompson | |
| 1754 | James West | | Hon. James Grimston | |
| 1761 | James West | | Viscount Nuneham | |
| 1768 | (Sir) Richard Sutton | | John Radcliffe | |
| 1780 | William Charles Sloper | | John Radcliffe | |
| 1783 by-election | William Charles Sloper | | The Viscount Grimston | |
| 1784 | William Charles Sloper | | Hon. William Grimston | |
| 1790 | Hon. Richard Bingham | Tory | John Calvert | |
| 1796 | Hon. Richard Bingham | Tory | Thomas Bucknall | Tory |
| June 1800 by-election | William Stephen Poyntz | Whig | Thomas Bucknall | Tory |
| 1802 | William Stephen Poyntz | Whig | Hon. James Grimston | Tory |
| 1807 | Joseph Thompson Halsey | Whig | Hon. James Grimston | Tory |
| 1809 by-election | Joseph Thompson Halsey | Whig | Daniel Giles | Whig |
| 1812 | Joseph Thompson Halsey | Whig | Christopher Smith | Tory |
| February 1818 by-election | William Tierney Robarts | Whig | Christopher Smith | Tory |
| June 1818 | William Tierney Robarts | Whig | Lord Charles Spencer-Churchill | Tory |
| 1820 | William Tierney Robarts | Whig | Christopher Smith | Tory |
| 1821 by-election | Sir Henry Wright-Wilson | Tory | Christopher Smith | Tory |
| 1826 | John Easthope | Whig | Christopher Smith | Tory |
| 1830 | Viscount Grimston | Tory | Charles Tennant | Whig |
| 1831 | Sir Francis Vincent, Bt | Whig | Richard Godson | Whig |
| 1832 | Sir Francis Vincent, Bt | Whig | Henry George Ward | Whig |
| 1835 | Hon. Edward Grimston | Conservative | Henry George Ward | Whig |
| 1837 | Hon. Edward Grimston | Conservative | George Muskett | Whig |
| February 1841 by-election | William Hare | Whig | George Muskett | Whig |
| June 1841 | William Hare | Whig | George Repton | Conservative |
| 1846 by-election | Benjamin Bond Cabbell | Conservative | George Repton | Conservative |
| 1847 | Alexander Raphael | Whig | George Repton | Conservative |
| 1850 by-election | Jacob Bell | Whig | George Repton | Conservative |
| 1852 | Constituency disfranchised for corruption | | | |

=== MPs since 1885 ===
Hertfordshire prior to 1885

| Election | Member | Party |
|---|---|---|
| 1885 | James Grimston | Conservative |
| 1892 | Vicary Gibbs | Conservative |
| 1904 by-election | John Slack | Liberal |
| 1906 | Sir Hildred Carlile | Conservative |
| 1919 by-election | Sir Francis Fremantle | Conservative |
| 1943 by-election | John Grimston | Conservative |
| 1945 | Cyril Dumpleton | Labour |
| 1950 | John Grimston | Conservative |
| 1959 | Sir Victor Goodhew | Conservative |
| 1983 | Peter Lilley | Conservative |
| 1997 | Kerry Pollard | Labour |
| 2005 | Anne Main | Conservative |
| 2019 | Daisy Cooper | Liberal Democrats |

== Election results ==
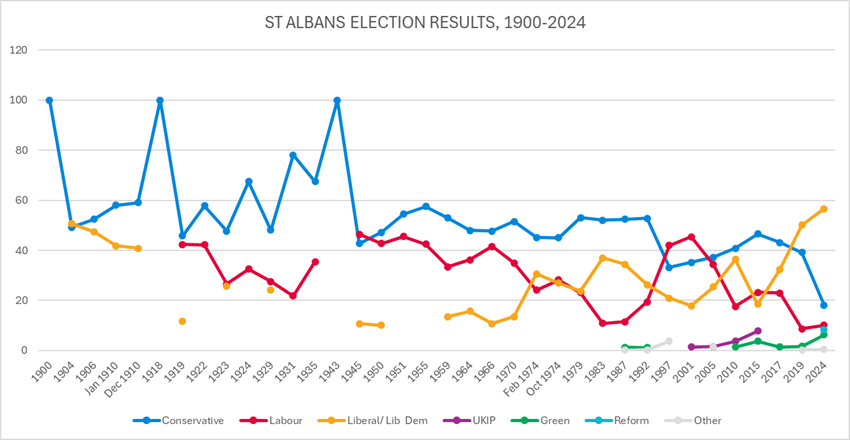
Election results 1900-2024

=== Elections in the 2020s ===
General election 2024: St Albans
| Party | Candidate | Votes | % | ±% |
|---|---|---|---|---|
| Liberal Democrats | Daisy Cooper | 29,222 | 56.6 | +6.7 |
| Conservative | James Spencer | 9,388 | 18.2 | −21.1 |
| Labour | Sophia Bhatti | 5,189 | 10.1 | +1.3 |
| Reform | John Dowdle | 4,336 | 8.4 | N/A |
| Green | Simon Grover | 3,272 | 6.3 | +4.6 |
| Heritage | Dafydd Morriss | 104 | 0.2 | N/A |
| SDP | Stewart Satterly | 103 | 0.2 | N/A |
| Majority | | 19,834 | 38.4 | +27.7 |
| Turnout | | 51,614 | 71.0 | −7.0 |
| Registered electors | | 72,739 | | |
| Liberal Democrats hold | | Swing | +13.8 | |

=== Elections in the 2010s ===
2019 notional result
| Party | Vote | % |
|---|---|---|
| Liberal Democrats | 27,610 | 49.9 |
| Conservative | 21,705 | 39.3 |
| Labour | 4,878 | 8.8 |
| Green | 950 | 1.7 |
| Others | 154 | 0.3 |
| Turnout | 55,297 | 78.0 |
| Electorate | 70,881 | |

General election 2019: St Albans
| Party | Candidate | Votes | % | ±% |
|---|---|---|---|---|
| Liberal Democrats | Daisy Cooper | 28,867 | 50.1 | +17.7 |
| Conservative | Anne Main | 22,574 | 39.2 | −3.9 |
| Labour | Rebecca Lury | 5,000 | 8.7 | −14.3 |
| Green | Simon Grover | 1,004 | 1.7 | +0.2 |
| Independent | Jules Sherrington | 154 | 0.3 | N/A |
| Majority | | 6,293 | 10.9 | N/A |
| Turnout | | 57,599 | 78.1 | −0.2 |
| Liberal Democrats gain from Conservative | | Swing | +10.8 | |

General election 2017: St Albans
| Party | Candidate | Votes | % | ±% |
|---|---|---|---|---|
| Conservative | Anne Main | 24,571 | 43.1 | −3.5 |
| Liberal Democrats | Daisy Cooper | 18,462 | 32.4 | +13.9 |
| Labour | Kerry Pollard | 13,137 | 23.0 | −0.3 |
| Green | Jack Easton | 828 | 1.5 | −2.2 |
| Majority | | 6,109 | 10.7 | −12.6 |
| Turnout | | 56,998 | 78.3 | +6.3 |
| Conservative hold | | Swing | −8.7 | |

General election 2015: St Albans
| Party | Candidate | Votes | % | ±% |
|---|---|---|---|---|
| Conservative | Anne Main | 25,392 | 46.6 | +5.8 |
| Labour | Kerry Pollard | 12,660 | 23.3 | +5.7 |
| Liberal Democrats | Sandy Walkington | 10,076 | 18.5 | −17.9 |
| UKIP | Chris Wright | 4,271 | 7.8 | +4.0 |
| Green | Jack Easton | 2,034 | 3.7 | +2.3 |
| Majority | | 12,732 | 23.3 | +18.9 |
| Turnout | | 54,433 | 72.0 | −3.4 |
| Conservative hold | | Swing | +0.1 | |

General election 2010: St Albans
| Party | Candidate | Votes | % | ±% |
|---|---|---|---|---|
| Conservative | Anne Main | 21,533 | 40.8 | |
| Liberal Democrats | Sandy Walkington | 19,228 | 36.4 | |
| Labour | Roma Mills | 9,288 | 17.6 | |
| UKIP | John Stocker | 2,028 | 3.8 | |
| Green | Jack Easton | 758 | 1.4 | |
| Majority | | 2,305 | 4.4 | |
| Turnout | | 52,835 | 75.4 | |
| Conservative hold | | Swing | | |

- This constituency underwent boundary changes between the 2005 and 2010 general elections and thus calculation of change in vote share is not meaningful

=== Elections in the 2000s ===
General election 2005: St Albans
| Party | Candidate | Votes | % | ±% |
|---|---|---|---|---|
| Conservative | Anne Main | 16,953 | 37.3 | +2.1 |
| Labour | Kerry Pollard | 15,592 | 34.3 | −11.1 |
| Liberal Democrats | Michael Green | 11,561 | 25.4 | +7.5 |
| UKIP | Richard Evans | 707 | 1.6 | +0.2 |
| St Albans Party | Janet Girsman | 430 | 0.9 | N/A |
| Independent | Mark Reynolds | 219 | 0.5 | N/A |
| Majority | | 1,361 | 3.0 | N/A |
| Turnout | | 45,462 | 70.00 | +3.7 |
| Conservative gain from Labour | | Swing | +6.6 | |

General election 2001: St Albans
| Party | Candidate | Votes | % | ±% |
|---|---|---|---|---|
| Labour | Kerry Pollard | 19,889 | 45.4 | +3.4 |
| Conservative | Charlie Elphicke | 15,423 | 35.2 | +2.0 |
| Liberal Democrats | Nick Rijke | 7,847 | 17.9 | −3.1 |
| UKIP | Chris Sherwin | 602 | 1.4 | N/A |
| Majority | | 4,466 | 10.2 | +1.4 |
| Turnout | | 43,761 | 66.3 | −11.2 |
| Labour hold | | Swing | +0.7 | |

=== Elections in the 1990s ===
General election 1997: St Albans
| Party | Candidate | Votes | % | ±% |
|---|---|---|---|---|
| Labour | Kerry Pollard | 21,338 | 42.0 | |
| Conservative | David Rutley | 16,879 | 33.2 | |
| Liberal Democrats | Anthony Rowlands | 10,692 | 21.0 | |
| Referendum | Jim Warrilow | 1,619 | 3.2 | |
| Rainbow Dream Ticket | Sari Craigen | 166 | 0.3 | |
| Natural Law | Ian Docker | 111 | 0.2 | |
| Majority | | 4,459 | 8.8 | N/A |
| Turnout | | 50,805 | 77.5 | |
| Labour gain from Conservative | | Swing | | |

- This constituency underwent boundary changes between the 1992 and 1997 general elections and thus calculation of change in vote share is not meaningful

General election 1992: St Albans
| Party | Candidate | Votes | % | ±% |
|---|---|---|---|---|
| Conservative | Peter Lilley | 32,709 | 52.8 | +0.3 |
| Liberal Democrats | Monica Howes | 16,305 | 26.3 | −8.2 |
| Labour | Kerry Pollard | 12,016 | 19.4 | +7.9 |
| Green | Craig Simmons | 734 | 1.2 | −0.1 |
| Natural Law | David Lucas | 161 | 0.3 | N/A |
| Majority | | 16,404 | 26.5 | +8.5 |
| Turnout | | 61,925 | 83.5 | +3.3 |
| Conservative hold | | Swing | −4.3 | |

=== Elections in the 1980s ===
General election 1987: St Albans
| Party | Candidate | Votes | % | ±% |
|---|---|---|---|---|
| Conservative | Peter Lilley | 31,726 | 52.5 | +0.4 |
| Liberal | Alexander Walkington | 20,845 | 34.5 | −2.5 |
| Labour Co-op | Tony McWalter | 6,922 | 11.5 | +0.6 |
| Green | Elaine Field | 788 | 1.3 | N/A |
| CPRP | William Pass | 110 | 0.2 | N/A |
| Majority | | 10,881 | 18.0 | +2.9 |
| Turnout | | 60,391 | 80.2 | +1.9 |
| Conservative hold | | Swing | +1.5 | |

General election 1983: St Albans
| Party | Candidate | Votes | % | ±% |
|---|---|---|---|---|
| Conservative | Peter Lilley | 29,676 | 52.1 | |
| Liberal | Alexander Walkington | 21,115 | 37.0 | |
| Labour | Rita Austin | 6,213 | 10.9 | |
| Majority | | 8,561 | 15.1 | |
| Turnout | | 57,004 | 78.3 | |
| Conservative hold | | Swing | | |

- This constituency underwent boundary changes between the 1979 and 1983 general elections and thus calculation of change in vote share is not meaningful

=== Elections in the 1970s ===
General election 1979: St Albans
| Party | Candidate | Votes | % | ±% |
|---|---|---|---|---|
| Conservative | Victor Goodhew | 31,301 | 53.1 | +8.1 |
| Liberal | David Picton | 14,057 | 23.8 | −3.1 |
| Labour Co-op | Ronald Greaves | 13,638 | 23.1 | −5.1 |
| Majority | | 17,244 | 29.3 | +12.5 |
| Turnout | | 58,996 | 80.4 | +2.4 |
| Conservative hold | | Swing | +5.6 | |

General election October 1974: St Albans
| Party | Candidate | Votes | % | ±% |
|---|---|---|---|---|
| Conservative | Victor Goodhew | 24,436 | 45.0 | −0.2 |
| Labour | Edwin Hudson | 15,301 | 28.2 | +4.1 |
| Liberal | Charles Anthony Shaw | 14,614 | 26.9 | −3.8 |
| Majority | | 9,135 | 16.8 | +2.3 |
| Turnout | | 54,351 | 78.0 | −6.6 |
| Conservative hold | | Swing | −2.15 | |

General election February 1974: St Albans
| Party | Candidate | Votes | % | ±% |
|---|---|---|---|---|
| Conservative | Victor Goodhew | 26,345 | 45.2 | |
| Liberal | Charles Anthony Shaw | 17,924 | 30.7 | |
| Labour | Daniel Lipman Bernstein | 14,077 | 24.1 | |
| Majority | | 8,421 | 14.5 | |
| Turnout | | 58,356 | 84.6 | |
| Conservative hold | | Swing | | |

- This constituency underwent boundary changes between the 1970 and February 1974 general elections and thus calculation of change in vote share is not meaningful.

General election 1970: St Albans
| Party | Candidate | Votes | % | ±% |
|---|---|---|---|---|
| Conservative | Victor Goodhew | 24,503 | 51.5 | +3.8 |
| Labour | Christopher Beaumont | 16,629 | 35.0 | −6.6 |
| Liberal | Charles Shaw | 6,439 | 13.5 | +2.8 |
| Majority | | 7,874 | 16.5 | +10.4 |
| Turnout | | 47,571 | 76.2 | −6.8 |
| Conservative hold | | Swing | +5.3 | |

=== Elections in the 1960s ===
General election 1966: St Albans
| Party | Candidate | Votes | % | ±% |
|---|---|---|---|---|
| Conservative | Victor Goodhew | 22,260 | 47.7 | −0.3 |
| Labour | Keith Kyle | 19,428 | 41.6 | +5.3 |
| Liberal | Julian J Wates | 4,977 | 10.7 | −5.0 |
| Majority | | 2,832 | 6.1 | −5.6 |
| Turnout | | 46,665 | 83.0 | +0.4 |
| Conservative hold | | Swing | −2.8 | |

General election 1964: St Albans
| Party | Candidate | Votes | % | ±% |
|---|---|---|---|---|
| Conservative | Victor Goodhew | 22,063 | 48.0 | −4.9 |
| Labour | Bruce Douglas-Mann | 16,672 | 36.3 | +2.8 |
| Liberal | William Glanville Brown | 7,231 | 15.7 | +2.1 |
| Majority | | 5,391 | 11.7 | −7.7 |
| Turnout | | 45,966 | 82.6 | −0.2 |
| Conservative hold | | Swing | −3.9 | |

=== Elections in the 1950s ===
General election 1959: St Albans
| Party | Candidate | Votes | % | ±% |
|---|---|---|---|---|
| Conservative | Victor Goodhew | 23,157 | 52.9 | −4.6 |
| Labour | Lawrence William Carroll | 14,650 | 33.5 | −9.0 |
| Liberal | WA Newton Jones | 5,948 | 13.6 | N/A |
| Majority | | 8,507 | 19.4 | +4.4 |
| Turnout | | 52,823 | 82.8 | +3.5 |
| Conservative hold | | Swing | +2.2 | |

General election 1955: St Albans
| Party | Candidate | Votes | % | ±% |
|---|---|---|---|---|
| Conservative | John Grimston | 21,828 | 57.5 | |
| Labour | Renée Short | 16,107 | 42.5 | |
| Majority | | 5,721 | 15.0 | |
| Turnout | | 37,935 | 79.3 | |
| Conservative hold | | Swing | | |

- This constituency underwent boundary changes between the 1951 and 1955 general elections and thus calculation of change in vote share is not meaningful

General election 1951: St Albans
| Party | Candidate | Votes | % | ±% |
|---|---|---|---|---|
| Conservative | John Grimston | 28,602 | 54.5 | +7.3 |
| Labour | John McKnight | 23,911 | 45.5 | +2.8 |
| Majority | | 4,691 | 9.0 | +4.5 |
| Turnout | | 52,513 | 84.1 | −0.9 |
| Conservative hold | | Swing | +2.2 | |

General election 1950: St Albans
| Party | Candidate | Votes | % | ±% |
|---|---|---|---|---|
| Conservative | John Grimston | 24,733 | 47.2 | |
| Labour | Cyril Dumpleton | 22,351 | 42.7 | |
| Liberal | Deryck Abel | 5,280 | 10.1 | |
| Majority | | 2,382 | 4.5 | |
| Turnout | | 52,464 | 85.0 | |
| Conservative gain from Labour | | Swing | | |

- This constituency underwent boundary changes between the 1945 and 1950 general elections and thus calculation of change in vote share is not meaningful

=== Elections in the 1940s ===
General election 1945: St Albans
| Party | Candidate | Votes | % | ±% |
|---|---|---|---|---|
| Labour | Cyril Dumpleton | 24,241 | 46.5 | |
| Conservative | John Grimston | 22,362 | 42.8 | |
| Liberal | Enid Lakeman | 5,601 | 10.7 | |
| Majority | | 1,879 | 3.7 | |
| Turnout | | 50,384 | 72.6 | |
| Labour gain from Conservative | | Swing | | |

- This constituency underwent boundary changes between the 1935 and 1945 general elections and thus calculation of change in vote share is not meaningful

1943 St Albans by-election
| Party | Candidate | Votes | % | ±% |
|---|---|---|---|---|
| Conservative | John Grimston | Unopposed | | |
| Conservative hold | | | | |

=== Elections in the 1930s ===
General election 1935: St Albans
| Party | Candidate | Votes | % | ±% |
|---|---|---|---|---|
| Conservative | Francis Fremantle | 33,743 | 67.5 | −10.6 |
| Labour | Hugh Franklin | 16,233 | 35.5 | +13.6 |
| Majority | | 17,510 | 35.0 | −21.2 |
| Turnout | | 49,976 | 62.6 | −9.3 |
| Conservative hold | | Swing | −10.6 | |

General election 1931: St Albans
| Party | Candidate | Votes | % | ±% |
|---|---|---|---|---|
| Conservative | Francis Fremantle | 36,690 | 78.1 | +30.0 |
| Labour | Monica Whately | 10,289 | 21.9 | −5.7 |
| Majority | | 26,401 | 56.2 | +35.7 |
| Turnout | | 46,979 | 71.9 | −0.7 |
| Conservative hold | | Swing | +17.8 | |

=== Elections in the 1920s ===
General election 1929: St Albans
| Party | Candidate | Votes | % | ±% |
|---|---|---|---|---|
| Unionist | Francis Fremantle | 20,436 | 48.1 | −19.4 |
| Labour | Monica Whately | 11,699 | 27.6 | −4.9 |
| Liberal | George Gordon Honeyman | 10,299 | 24.3 | N/A |
| Majority | | 8,737 | 20.5 | −14.5 |
| Turnout | | 41,434 | 72.6 | +2.3 |
| Unionist hold | | Swing | −7.25 | |

General election 1924: St Albans
| Party | Candidate | Votes | % | ±% |
|---|---|---|---|---|
| Unionist | Francis Fremantle | 18,004 | 67.5 | +19.8 |
| Labour | Frank Herbert | 8,862 | 32.5 | +6.0 |
| Majority | | 9,322 | 35.0 | +13.8 |
| Turnout | | 26,864 | 70.3 | +1.5 |
| Unionist hold | | Swing | +6.9 | |

General election 1923: St Albans
| Party | Candidate | Votes | % | ±% |
|---|---|---|---|---|
| Unionist | Francis Fremantle | 11,968 | 47.7 | −10.1 |
| Labour | Christopher Thomson | 6,640 | 26.5 | −15.7 |
| Liberal | Harry Krauss Nield | 6,469 | 25.8 | N/A |
| Majority | | 5,328 | 21.2 | +5.6 |
| Turnout | | 25,077 | 68.8 | −2.3 |
| Unionist hold | | Swing | +2.8 | |

General election 1922: St Albans
| Party | Candidate | Votes | % | ±% |
|---|---|---|---|---|
| Unionist | Francis Fremantle | 14,594 | 57.8 | +12.0 |
| Labour | John W. Brown | 10,662 | 42.2 | −0.2 |
| Majority | | 3,932 | 15.6 | +12.2 |
| Turnout | | 25,256 | 71.1 | +8.3 |
| Unionist hold | | Swing | +6.1 | |

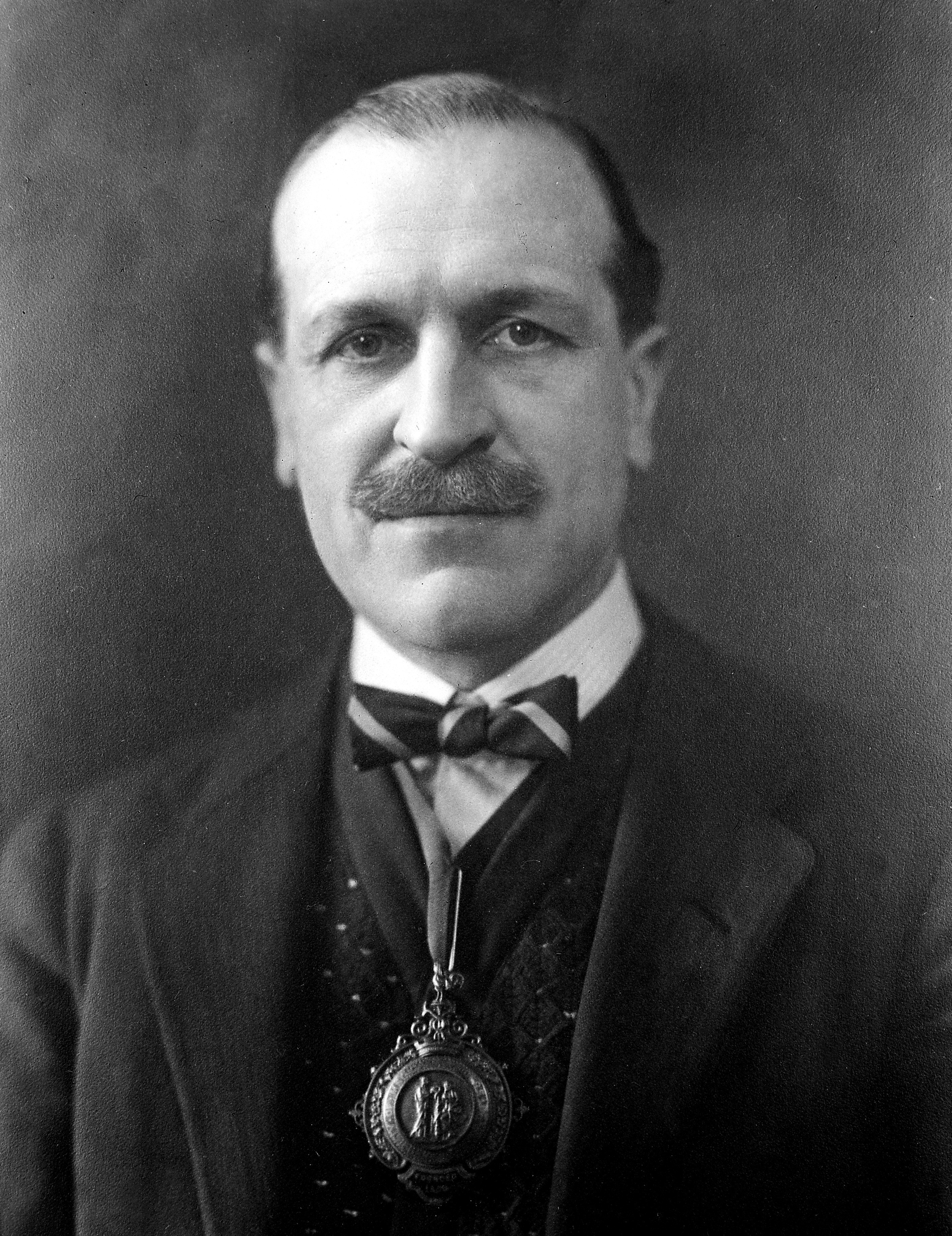
Fremantle

=== Elections in the 1910s ===
1919 St Albans by-election
| Party | | Candidate | Votes | % | ±% |
|---|---|---|---|---|---|
| C | Unionist | Francis Fremantle | 9,621 | 45.8 | N/A |
| | Labour | John W. Brown | 8,908 | 42.4 | N/A |
| | Liberal | Milner Gray | 2,474 | 11.8 | N/A |
| Majority | | | 713 | 3.4 | N/A |
| Turnout | | | 21,003 | 62.8 | N/A |
| | Unionist hold | | Swing | N/A | |
C indicates candidate endorsed by the coalition government.

General election 1918: St Albans
| Party | | Candidate | Votes | % | ±% |
|---|---|---|---|---|---|
| C | Unionist | Hildred Carlile | Unopposed | | |
| | Unionist hold | | | | |
C indicates candidate endorsed by the coalition government.

Phillimore

General election, December 1910: St Albans
| Party | Candidate | Votes | % | ±% |
|---|---|---|---|---|
| Conservative | Hildred Carlile | 6,899 | 59.1 | +1.0 |
| Liberal | Robert Charles Phillimore | 4,777 | 40.9 | −1.0 |
| Majority | | 2,122 | 18.2 | +2.0 |
| Turnout | | 11,676 | 83.8 | −6.6 |
| Conservative hold | | Swing | +1.0 | |

General election, January 1910: St Albans
| Party | Candidate | Votes | % | ±% |
|---|---|---|---|---|
| Conservative | Hildred Carlile | 7,323 | 58.1 | +5.6 |
| Liberal | Henry Roscoe Beddoes | 5,271 | 41.9 | −5.6 |
| Majority | | 2,052 | 16.2 | +11.2 |
| Turnout | | 12,594 | 90.4 | +10.1 |
| Conservative hold | | Swing | +5.6 | |

=== Elections in the 1900s ===
General election 1906: St Albans
| Party | Candidate | Votes | % | ±% |
|---|---|---|---|---|
| Conservative | Hildred Carlile | 5,856 | 52.5 | N/A |
| Liberal | John Bamford Slack | 5,304 | 47.5 | N/A |
| Majority | | 552 | 5.0 | N/A |
| Turnout | | 11,160 | 89.3 | N/A |
| Registered electors | | 12,497 | | |
| Conservative hold | | Swing | N/A | |

Slack

1904 St Albans by-election
| Party | Candidate | Votes | % | ±% |
|---|---|---|---|---|
| Liberal | John Bamford Slack | 4,757 | 50.7 | N/A |
| Conservative | Vicary Gibbs | 4,635 | 49.3 | N/A |
| Majority | | 132 | 1.4 | N/A |
| Turnout | | 9,382 | 81.5 | N/A |
| Registered electors | | 11,518 | | |
| Liberal gain from Conservative | | Swing | N/A | |

General election 1900: St Albans
| Party | Candidate | Votes | % | ±% |
|---|---|---|---|---|
| Conservative | Vicary Gibbs | Unopposed | | |
| Conservative hold | | | | |

=== Elections in the 1890s ===
General election 1895: St Albans
| Party | Candidate | Votes | % | ±% |
|---|---|---|---|---|
| Conservative | Vicary Gibbs | Unopposed | | |
| Conservative hold | | | | |

Gibbs

General election 1892: St Albans
| Party | Candidate | Votes | % | ±% |
|---|---|---|---|---|
| Conservative | Vicary Gibbs | 3,417 | 45.1 | N/A |
| Liberal | Thomas Morgan Harvey | 2,573 | 34.0 | N/A |
| Ind. Conservative | William Henry Bingham-Cox | 1,580 | 20.9 | N/A |
| Majority | | 844 | 11.1 | N/A |
| Turnout | | 7,570 | 78.3 | N/A |
| Registered electors | | 9,672 | | |
| Conservative hold | | Swing | N/A | |

=== Elections in the 1880s ===
General election 1886: St Albans
| Party | Candidate | Votes | % | ±% |
|---|---|---|---|---|
| Conservative | James Grimston | Unopposed | | |
| Conservative hold | | | | |

General election 1885: St Albans
| Party | Candidate | Votes | % | ±% |
|---|---|---|---|---|
| Conservative | James Grimston | 4,108 | 57.5 | |
| Liberal | John Coles | 3,037 | 42.5 | |
| Majority | | 1,071 | 15.0 | |
| Turnout | | 7,145 | 81.7 | |
| Registered electors | | 8,741 | | |
| Conservative win (new seat) | | | | |

=== Elections in the 1850s ===
On 3 May 1852, the borough was disenfranchised after a Royal Commission found proof of extensive bribery. The electorate was incorporated into Hertfordshire.

By-election, 24 December 1850: St Albans
| Party | Candidate | Votes | % | ±% |
|---|---|---|---|---|
| Whig | Jacob Bell | 276 | 65.2 | −5.0 |
| Conservative | Robert Carden | 147 | 34.8 | +5.0 |
| Majority | | 129 | 30.4 | +28.4 |
| Turnout | | 423 | 87.6 | +0.5 |
| Registered electors | | 483 | | |
| Whig hold | | Swing | −5.0 | |

- Caused by Raphael's death

=== Elections in the 1840s ===
General election 1847: St Albans
| Party | Candidate | Votes | % | ±% |
|---|---|---|---|---|
| Whig | Alexander Raphael | 295 | 31.8 | +4.6 |
| Conservative | George Repton | 276 | 29.8 | −27.1 |
| Whig | John Wilks | 230 | 24.8 | +9.0 |
| Whig | Frederick Craven | 126 | 13.6 | N/A |
| Turnout | | 464 (est) | 87.1 (est) | −3.5 |
| Registered electors | | 532 | | |
| Majority | | 19 | 2.0 | +1.3 |
| Whig hold | | Swing | +9.1 | |
| Majority | | 46 | 5.0 | +1.8 |
| Conservative hold | | Swing | −27.1 | |

By-election, 11 August 1846: St Albans
| Party | Candidate | Votes | % | ±% |
|---|---|---|---|---|
| Conservative | Benjamin Bond Cabbell | 264 | 63.9 | −7.0 |
| Whig | William Hare | 149 | 36.1 | +6.9 |
| Majority | | 115 | 27.8 | N/A |
| Turnout | | 413 | 76.3 | −14.3 |
| Registered electors | | 541 | | |
| Conservative gain from Whig | | Swing | −7.0 | |

- Caused by Hare's appointment as a Lord-in-Waiting to Queen Victoria

General election 1841: St Albans
| Party | Candidate | Votes | % | ±% |
|---|---|---|---|---|
| Conservative | George Repton | 288 | 30.4 | −8.5 |
| Whig | William Hare | 258 | 27.2 | +8.5 |
| Conservative | Henry Thomas Worley | 251 | 26.5 | +2.9 |
| Whig | George Alfred Muskett | 150 | 15.8 | −2.9 |
| Turnout | | 482 | 90.6 | −3.7 |
| Registered electors | | 532 | | |
| Majority | | 30 | 3.2 | +1.7 |
| Conservative hold | | Swing | −5.7 | |
| Majority | | 7 | 0.7 | −13.1 |
| Whig hold | | Swing | +5.7 | |

By-election, 9 February 1841: St Albans
| Party | Candidate | Votes | % | ±% |
|---|---|---|---|---|
| Whig | William Hare | 252 | 55.1 | +17.7 |
| Conservative | Benjamin Bond Cabbell | 205 | 44.9 | −17.6 |
| Majority | | 47 | 10.2 | N/A |
| Turnout | | 457 | 85.9 | −8.4 |
| Registered electors | | 532 | | |
| Whig gain from Conservative | | Swing | +17.7 | |

- Caused by Grimston's resignation by accepting the office of Steward of the Chiltern Hundreds

=== Elections in the 1830s ===
General election 1837: St Albans
| Party | Candidate | Votes | % | ±% |
|---|---|---|---|---|
| Conservative | Edward Grimston⋅ | 361 | 38.9 | −2.1 |
| Whig | George Alfred Muskett | 347 | 37.4 | +5.2 |
| Conservative | Benjamin Bond Cabbell | 219 | 23.6 | −3.2 |
| Turnout | | 561 | 94.3 | c. +13.1 |
| Registered electors | | 595 | | |
| Majority | | 14 | 1.5 | −7.3 |
| Conservative hold | | Swing | −2.4 | |
| Majority | | 128 | 13.8 | +8.4 |
| Whig hold | | Swing | +5.3 | |

General election 1835: St Albans
| Party | Candidate | Votes | % | ±% |
|---|---|---|---|---|
| Conservative | Edward Grimston⋅ | 362 | 41.0 | +25.5 |
| Whig | Henry George Ward | 284 | 32.2 | −36.7 |
| Conservative | William Horsley Beresford | 237 | 26.8 | +11.3 |
| Turnout | | c. 442 | c. 81.2 | c. −15.8 |
| Registered electors | | 544 | | |
| Majority | | 78 | 8.8 | N/A |
| Conservative gain from Whig | | Swing | +22.0 | |
| Majority | | 47 | 5.4 | +2.9 |
| Whig hold | | Swing | −36.8 | |

General election 1832: St Albans
| Party | Candidate | Votes | % | ±% |
|---|---|---|---|---|
| Whig | Francis Vincent | 392 | 35.3 | −2.2 |
| Whig | Henry George Ward | 373 | 33.6 | −2.5 |
| Tory | William Turner | 345 | 31.1 | +4.7 |
| Majority | | 28 | 2.5 | −7.2 |
| Turnout | | 637 | 97.0 | c. +9.5 |
| Registered electors | | 657 | | |
| Whig hold | | Swing | −2.3 | |
| Whig hold | | Swing | −2.4 | |

General election 1831: St Albans
| Party | Candidate | Votes | % | ±% |
|---|---|---|---|---|
| Whig | Francis Vincent | 421 | 37.5 | +8.9 |
| Whig | Richard Godson | 406 | 36.1 | +10.3 |
| Tory | James Grimston | 297 | 26.4 | −19.2 |
| Majority | | 109 | 9.7 | +6.9 |
| Turnout | | 656 | c. 87.5 | c. +4.4 |
| Registered electors | | c. 750 | | |
| Whig hold | | Swing | +9.3 | |
| Whig gain from Tory | | Swing | +10.0 | |

General election 1830: St Albans
| Party | Candidate | Votes | % |
|---|---|---|---|
| Tory | James Grimston | 495 | 45.6 |
| Whig | Charles Tennant | 311 | 28.6 |
| Whig | Henry Gally Knight | 280 | 25.8 |
| Turnout | | 623 | c. 83.1 |
| Registered electors | | c. 750 | |
| Majority | | 184 | 17.0 |
| Tory hold | | | |
| Majority | | 31 | 2.8 |
| Whig hold | | | |

== See also ==
- List of parliamentary constituencies in Hertfordshire
- List of parliamentary constituencies in the East of England (region)

== Sources ==
- Robert Beatson, A Chronological Register of Both Houses of Parliament (London: Longman, Hurst, Res & Orme, 1807)
- D Brunton & D H Pennington, Members of the Long Parliament (London: George Allen & Unwin, 1954)
- Cobbett's Parliamentary history of England, from the Norman Conquest in 1066 to the year 1803 (London: Thomas Hansard, 1808)
- F W S Craig, British Parliamentary Election Results 1832–1885 (2nd edition, Aldershot: Parliamentary Research Services, 1989)
- Henry Stooks Smith, The Parliaments of England from 1715 to 1847 (2nd edition, edited by FWS Craig – Chichester: Parliamentary Reference Publications, 1973)
- Leigh Rayment's Historical List of MPs – Constituencies beginning with "S" (part 1)
