= John Bamford Slack =

British politician (1857–1909)

Bamford Slack

Sir John Bamford Slack (11 July 1857 – 11 February 1909) was a British politician, member of the Liberal Party and Methodist lay preacher.

== Life ==
Slack was born in Ripley, Derbyshire in 1857. His Liberal Wesleyan Methodist parents were Mary Ann (born Bamford) and Thomas Slack. His maternal grandfather made bricks and his younger sister was the temperance activist Agnes Elizabeth Slack.

He was elected to the House of Commons for the constituency of St Albans at the 1904 St Albans by-election, replacing Vicary Gibbs.

In 1905, he introduced a bill for women's suffrage, which was talked out.

He received a knighthood.

He married Alice Maud Mary Bretherton (died 1932), who after his death; became the first wife of Sir Banister Flight Fletcher.

Parliament of the United Kingdom
| Preceded by Vicary Gibbs | Member of Parliament for St Albans; 1904 – 1906 | Succeeded by Sir Hildred Carlile |
