= Corrie de Roos-Oudegeest =

Dutch politician (1899–1998)

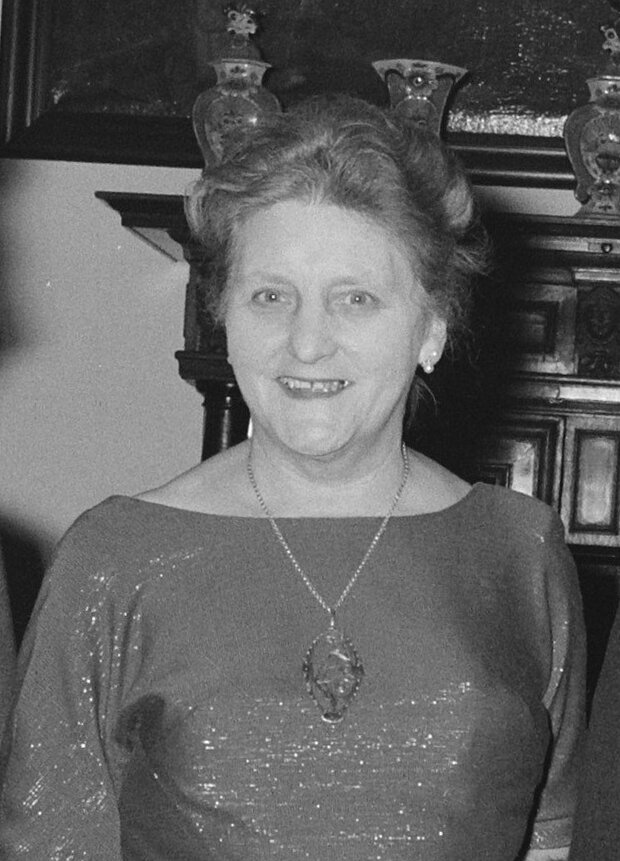
- Corrie Oudegeest in 1962

Member of House of Representatives
- In office 6 November 1956 – 4 June 1963

Personal details
- Born: 7 September 1899 Utrecht
- Died: 24 February 1998 (aged 98) Baarn
- Party: Social Democratic Workers' Party (1925-1946); Labour Party (from 1946)

Corrie de Roos-Oudegeest (7 September 1899 – 24 February 1998) was a Dutch politician representing the Labour Party (PvdA). From 6 November 1956 to 4 June 1963, she was a member of the House of Representatives for that party. In the House, she primarily focused on consumer affairs. In 1928 and 1929, she also served for several months as the secretary to Amsterdam alderman Floor Wibaut.

Corrie de Roos-Oudegeest was the daughter of trade union leader Jan Oudegeest. On 23 March 1927, she married Amsterdam alderman Albert de Roos.
