= Hildred Carlile =

British politician (1852–1942)

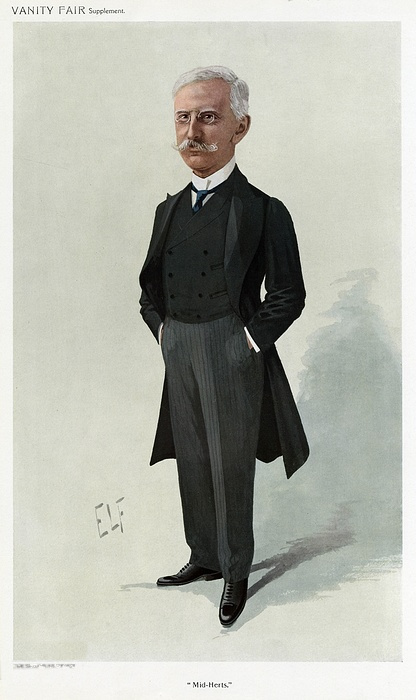
"Mid Herts", caricature by Elf in Vanity Fair, 1909.

Sir Edward Hildred Carlile, 1st Baronet, CBE (10 July 1852 – 26 September 1942) was an English businessman and Conservative Party politician.

== Early life ==
Born in Richmond, Surrey, in 1852, Carlile was educated at St Albans School and abroad. He made his career in business and politics. In business he was a partner in the firm of Jonas Brook & Brothers, Meltham Mills, Huddersfield. This firm later merged with J. & P. Coats Limited (now Coats plc), and he became a Director of that company.

== Politics ==
He stood unsuccessfully in Huddersfield at the 1900 general election. He was elected as the Member of Parliament (MP) for St Albans at the 1906 general election. He was re-elected at both the elections in 1910, and returned unopposed as a Coalition Conservative in 1918. Due to ill-health he resigned from the House of Commons on 20 November 1919 by the procedural device of accepting appointment as Steward of the Manor of Northstead.

He unsuccessfully stood as the Conservative candidate in the 1921 Hertford by-election

Carlile was a J.P. for Hertfordshire, the West Riding of Yorkshire, and for the Borough of Huddersfield. From 1910 to 1919 he was a member of the House of Commons Accounts Committee.

He was on 11 April 1900 commissioned a second lieutenant in the Queen's Own Yorkshire Dragoons, a volunteer cavalry regiment, and was or many years active in the Yeomanry and Volunteers, eventually becoming Honorary Colonel of the 5th Battalion Duke of Wellington's Regiment (1906–39). During World War I he worked for the Red Cross.

== Philanthropy ==
In 1914 he gave 100,000 guineas (an enormous sum in those days) as an endowment to Bedford College, University of London (he was the first Fellow on the Council of the college), which made possible the establishment of Chairs in Botany, English, Latin, and Physics.

He was knighted in 1911, appointed deputy lieutenant of Hertfordshire in 1912, created a baronet, of Ponsbourne Park, in the County of Hertford on 27 June 1917, and appointed a Commander of the Order of the British Empire (CBE) in 1920. In 1922 he was High Sheriff of Hertfordshire. One of his brothers was Wilson Carlile, founder of the Church Army, of which Hildred was a vice-president. At age 90 he died, like his latter brother, in 1942.

Parliament of the United Kingdom
Preceded by John Bamford Slack	Member of Parliament for St Albans; 1906–1919	Succeeded by Sir Francis Edward Fremantle
Honorary titles
Preceded by Sir Arthur Cory-Wright	High Sheriff of Hertfordshire; 1922	Succeeded by George Strachan Pawle
Baronetage of the United Kingdom
New creation	Baronet (of Ponsbourne Park); 1917–1942	Extinct
