= 1904 St Albans by-election =

- 12 February 1904

Candidate	Bamford Slack	Gibbs
Party	Liberal	Conservative
Popular vote	4,757	4,625
Percentage	50.7%	49.3%
MP before election
Vicary Gibbs
Conservative
Subsequent MP
John Bamford Slack
Liberal

The 1904 St Albans by-election was a Parliamentary by-election held on 12 February 1904. The constituency returned one Member of Parliament (MP) to the House of Commons of the United Kingdom, elected by the first past the post voting system.

It was the first contested parliamentary election in St Albans since 1892. The two-way contest was dominated by the contemporary debate between free trade and tariff reform, and fought with the assistance of the major national organisations on both sides of that divide. It also reflected the wider national divide between high church Conservatism and nonconformist Liberalism. After a campaign marred by several incidents of unrest, the Liberal Party candidate narrowly won the seat from the Conservatives, who had held the seat since its creation in 1885.

== Vacancy ==
Gibbs

The vacancy was caused by the disqualification from the Commons of the sitting Conservative MP Vicary Gibbs, who had held the seat since 1892. He had been returned unopposed in 1895 and 1900, but was disqualified in February 1904.

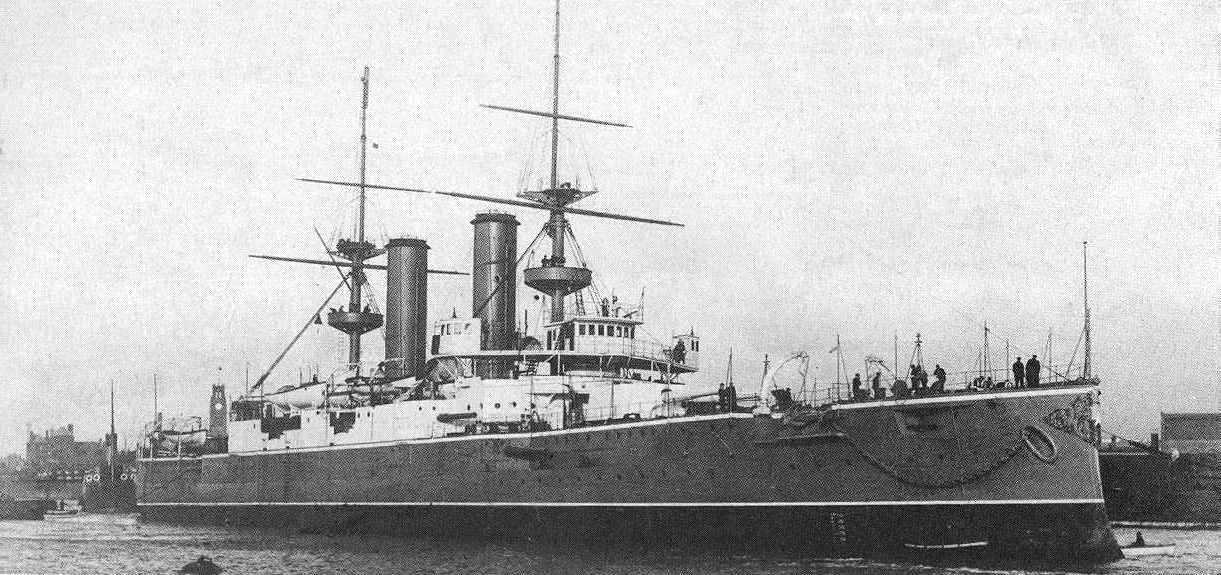
HMS Triumph in January 1904

He and his brother Alban (an MP for the City of London) were partners in the firm Antony Gibbs & Sons, which had organised the sale to the Admiralty of two pre-dreadnought battleships built in England for the Chilean Navy, in order to avoid them being sold to a rival power when Chile did not complete the purchase. He told his constituents that if the ships had passed into the hands of a rival nation, such as Russia (which had made a cash offer for them), the balance of power would have been significantly altered, and that Britain would have fallen behind in naval power relative to their rivals. The two warships, Triumph and Swiftsure, were purchased by the Royal Navy on 12 March 1903, and served through the First World War.

However, by managing the sale to the Admiralty the brothers disqualified themselves from the House of Commons, under provisions of the House of Commons (Disqualification) Act 1782 (22 Geo. 3. c. 45) which debarred MPs from accepting contracts from the Crown. Vicary Gibbs told his constituents on 18 January that he would resign from the Commons by taking the Chiltern Hundreds, and then present himself for re-election. However, since the Gibbs brothers were already disqualified, he did not need to take the usual step of disqualifying himself by taking the Chiltern Hundreds, and in letters of 1 February 1904 he and his brother both informed the Speaker of the contract. Vicary Gibbs noted that "I am advised that by so doing I have, under an Act of George III, vacated my seat in Parliament".

His letter was read to the Commons on 2 February, and the writ was moved the following day. The polling date was set as 12 February.

== Candidates ==
Slack

Both Gibbs and the Liberal Party prospective candidate John Bamford Slack were campaigning in the constituency before his disqualification was formalised. The Times newspaper reported on 20 January that the by-election was unlikely to be contested by the Liberals, but at a meeting on 24 January the St Albans Liberals adopted Slack as their candidate.

Slack was a 46-year-old solicitor, and a prominent Wesleyan Methodist. Born in Ripley, Derbyshire, he was educated at the University of London and had qualified as a solicitor in Derbyshire in 1880, where he was elected as a Liberal member of the first Derbyshire County Council. He had practised in London since 1889, becoming by 1904 a partner in the firm of Monro, Slack and Atkinson of Queen Victoria Street. He was a Liberal Party activist in the boroughs of Holborn and St Pancras. A noted temperance campaigner, he became a member of the Wesleyan Church's annual conference, President of the Local Preacher's Association, and an active member of the West London Mission.

The Conservatives selected 50-year-old Gibbs to defend the seat which he had just vacated. The Eton-educated Gibbs was a City of London businessman, son of Hucks Gibbs, 1st Baron Aldenham, and a wealthy landowner.

== The campaign ==
The dominant issue in the campaign was the debate between free trade and protectionism. The Conservatives and their Liberal Unionist allies were split on the issue of "tariff reform", a form of selective protectionism promoted by Joseph Chamberlain as Imperial Preference. Gibbs had told supporters in January that if re-elected he would support Chamberlain's proposals

By contrast, Slack had proclaimed himself from the outset as a supporter of free trade. At the meeting in St Albans on 23 January when he was selected, he described Chamberlain's policy as "retrograde, mischievous, and ruinous for the country and the empire", pledging himself to oppose protective tariffs, no matter what they were called. He said that the two big issues facing an incoming Liberal government were land and drink.

=== Supporters ===
Slack was assisted in his campaign by the Free Trade Union, who established an office in St Albans in late January, and organised a series of meetings. He also received the support of the Church Association, an evangelical group who had submitted a list of questions to both candidates regarding ritualism. They were satisfied with Slack's replies on all points, and unhappy with those from Gibbs, so they threw their weight behind the Liberals, claiming that they could mobilise 600 votes. Incensed by Gibbs's vote against the Church Discipline Bill in 1899, and buoyed by their success in other recent by-elections, they prepared for an "active crusade".

Both candidates were joined by notable supporters. On 3 February, Frederick Halsey addressed a meeting at St Albans in support of Gibbs, who deplored the destruction of local industries by "unfair foreign competition". The next day, Lewis Vernon Harcourt addressed a large Liberal demonstration in St Albans, telling the crowd that the Tariff Commission was a caucus of manufacturers and traders trying to corner supplies and swell their profits.

The divisions's licensed victuallers met in St Albans on 3 February under the auspices of the Hertfordshire Brewer's association. After considering responses from the two candidates to questions about compensation when licences were withdrawn, they unanimously decided to support Gibbs. The Times reported that the division's 273 licence-holders were likely to vote accordingly.

Meanwhile, the Liberals secured the support of the Postal and Telegraph Clerks, the Workmen's National Housing Council, and the Amalgamated Society of Lithographic printers. Slack's campaign kept up a schedule of six or seven public meetings each night, with queues of carriages and motor cars leaving St Albans every night to carry speakers to other parts of the division.

By Monday 8th, tariff reformers were reporting growing support among the artisans of St Albans. The town's principal industries were boot-making, printing, straw hats and bonnet-making, and silk, and the latter two had both been hit by foreign competition. The protectionists argued that the trade could be restored by tariffs. The Liberals responded with literature asserting that protection would increase the cost of living for working people, but sought their gains elsewhere. The agricultural labourers had traditionally voted Liberal, and were considered unlikely to change, while the heavily unionised personnel of the Great Northern Railway at Hatfield were expected to support Slack. The Liberals hoped to increase their support amongst the division's many nonconformists.

=== Tensions and disorder ===
On Saturday 6 February, The Times reported that a "spirit of active antagonism" was developing between the two campaigns. Conservatives had been removed from the Liberal demonstration earlier in the week, and had retaliated by packing two Liberal meetings in St Albans on Thursday 4th. They heckled the speakers, and in one case closed Slack's meeting with a vote of support for Gibbs.

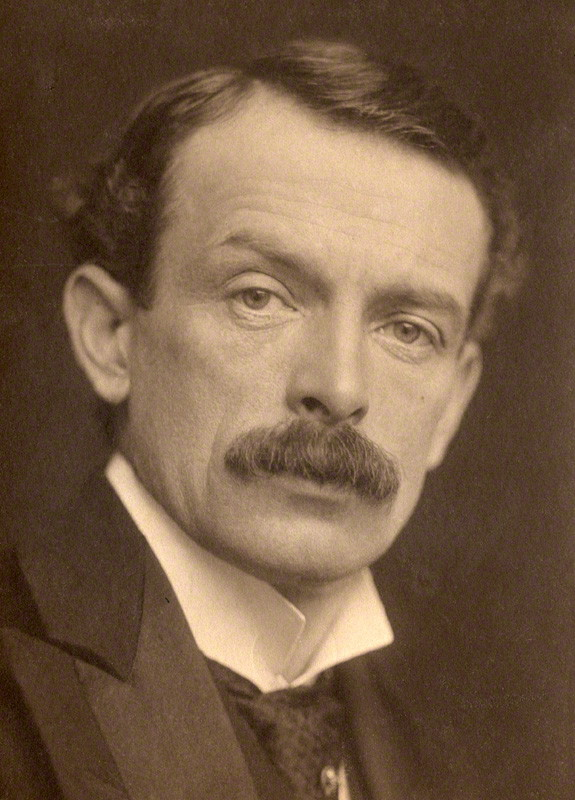
David Lloyd George, pelted with eggs in St Albans

Tensions continued when David Lloyd George addressed a meeting at St Albans drill hall on Saturday. His condemnations of the Conservative government were interrupted, and the hecklers expelled. Outside the hall, a crowd of those excluded from the meeting banged the doors, threw stones onto the roof, and when Slack arrived halfway through the meeting he was pelted with eggs. The meeting's chairman publicly appealed to Gibbs to restrain his supporters, but to no avail. When Lloyd George left the meeting, he required a police escort to pass through the crowd, and despite the protection of stewards and bodyguards his carriage was lifted off the ground by protesters. He escaped serious injury, but left with his face and clothing splattered with eggs, and to avoid another mob which had gathered at the railway station, his train left early. The police were unable to restrain the crowds, and Slack also required bodyguards when he left the meeting. He insisted that the egg-throwers were not local people, but "blackguards hired by a certain corrupt organisation to come down here to corrupt St Albans".

Gibbs and his agent both wrote to Slack and his agent expressing regret for the disturbance, and promising to assist in keeping order at further Liberal meetings. The Liberal agent, Mr W. Bernthal, wrote to the local representatives of the Tariff Reform League, excusing them from any blame for the disorder.

On Tuesday 9 February, the St Albans City Corporation discussed the disorder. Liberal councillors condemned the "disgraceful scenes", and called for prosecution of the ringleaders. However, the Chief Constable advised against issuing a summons before polling day.

=== Nominations ===
The two candidates were nominated at the town hall in St Albans on Tuesday 9 February. Gibbs received 33 nominations, signed by railway workers, straw hat makers, farmers, and others. Slack's 20 nominators included the Church Association, trade unions, and other organised bodies.

The final days of the campaign were more peaceful. On Wednesday 10 February, Gibbs spent most of the day with farmers at the weekly market in St Albans, while Slack toured some of the city's major businesses and addressed workers on the Midland Railway. In the evening, the Conservatives held a meeting of 3,000 people at the drill hall, where the principal speaker was Sir Robert Hermon-Hodge, the MP for Henley. Slack received letters of support from John Morley MP and from the Liberal leader Sir Henry Campbell-Bannerman.

On Thursday, the final day of campaigning, both parties insisted that their canvassing returns showed them winning by a narrow margin. Gibbs visited polling stations at several towns near St Albans, and in the afternoon returned to the city to address the workers at Dangerfield's colour printing works. However, Gibbs had not replied to an enquiry from the Parliamentary Committee of the Trades Union Congress (TUC) as to whether he would support the Trade Disputes Bill introduced to the Commons by James Mellor Paulton on 5 February. Slack had confirmed his support for the measure, so the TUC asked electors to vote for Slack.

In an eve-of-poll telegram, Slack was told by H. H. Asquith that his victory would be a "triumph for the cause of free trade and progress".

== Result ==
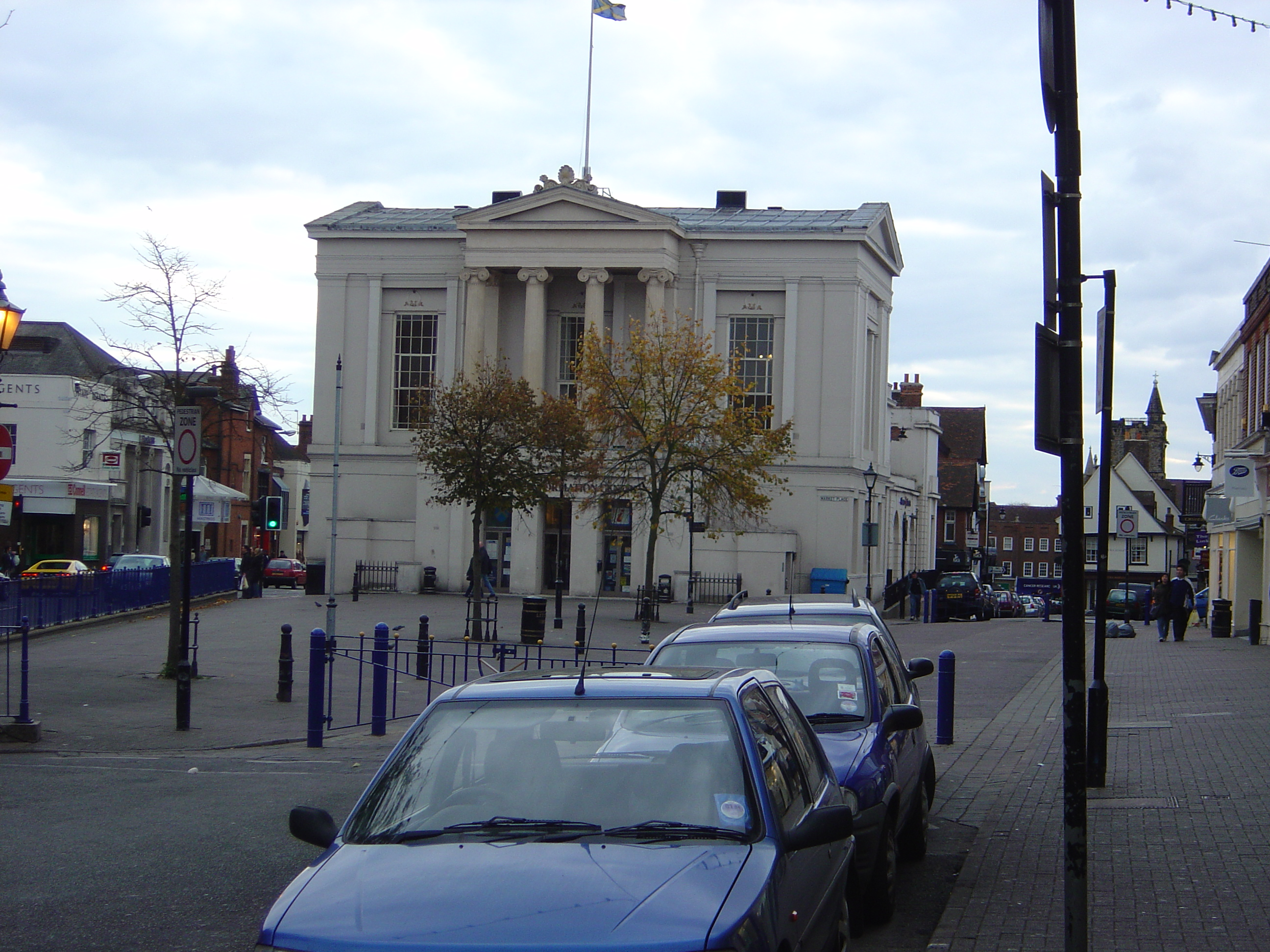
The town hall in St Albans, where the results were announced

Polling took place on Friday 12 February. The weather was fine in the morning, but the afternoon brought heavy rain and gales. Roads were flooded in many places, and many of the motor cars which had been engaged to bring voters to polling stations were unable to make the journey. The downpour was thought by both sides to have considerably weakened the Liberal chances of success, because although a high turnout was expected, the rain made it impossible for many working class voters to travel to the poll.

The result was announced from the balcony of the town hall in St Albans on Saturday 13th, by the High Sheriff. Despite the bad weather, Slack had won a narrow victory, with a majority of 132 votes (1.4% of the total). Out of the division's 11,518 registered electors, 9,423 (81.5%) had cast valid votes, with a further 41 spoilt ballots.

The announcement was greeted by cheering from the crowd, and speeches from the candidates, in which they thanked their supporters and the Sheriff. Gibbs said that although he had worked as hard as he could, his health had been poor. Slack also thanked his opponents for their courtesy during the campaign, and after a meeting at the St Albans Liberal Club he went to Clarence Park recreation ground to kick off for the St Albans Football Club at a match.

St Albans by-election, 1904
Party	Candidate	Votes	%	±%
Liberal	John Bamford Slack	4,757	50.7	New
Conservative	Vicary Gibbs	4,625	49.3	N/A
Majority		132	1.4	N/A
Turnout		9,382	81.5	N/A
Liberal gain from Conservative		Swing	N/A	

== Aftermath ==
Slack did support the Trade Disputes Bill at second reading, but held the seat for less than two years, until his defeat at the general election in January 1906 by Hildred Carlile.

General election 1906: St Albans
Party	Candidate	Votes	%	±%
Conservative	Hildred Carlile	5,856	52.5	N/A
Liberal	John Bamford Slack	5,304	47.5	N/A
Majority		552	5.0	N/A
Turnout		11,160	89.3	N/A
Conservative hold		Swing	N/A	

In the landslide victory for the Liberals, the Conservatives and Liberal Unionists had a net loss of 211 seats, and St Albans was one of their few gains. Slack was knighted in 1906, and remained a prominent Liberal until his death in London in February 1909, aged 51. He remained the only Liberal MP until 2019 elected for St Albans since the county constituency was created in 1885.

Gibbs contested Bradford Central in 1906, but never returned to Parliament. He remained prominent in Tariff Reform issues, served on the boards of many companies, and co-authored the 1911 edition of The Complete Peerage. He became a notable horticulturalist in his garden at Elstree, and in January 1932 he died at his London home, aged 78.

== See also ==
- List of United Kingdom by-elections
- St Albans constituency
- 1919 St Albans by-election
- 1943 St Albans by-election
