= 1919 St Albans by-election =

UK parliamentary by-election

- 10 December 1919
- Registered: 33,437
- Turnout: 62.8%
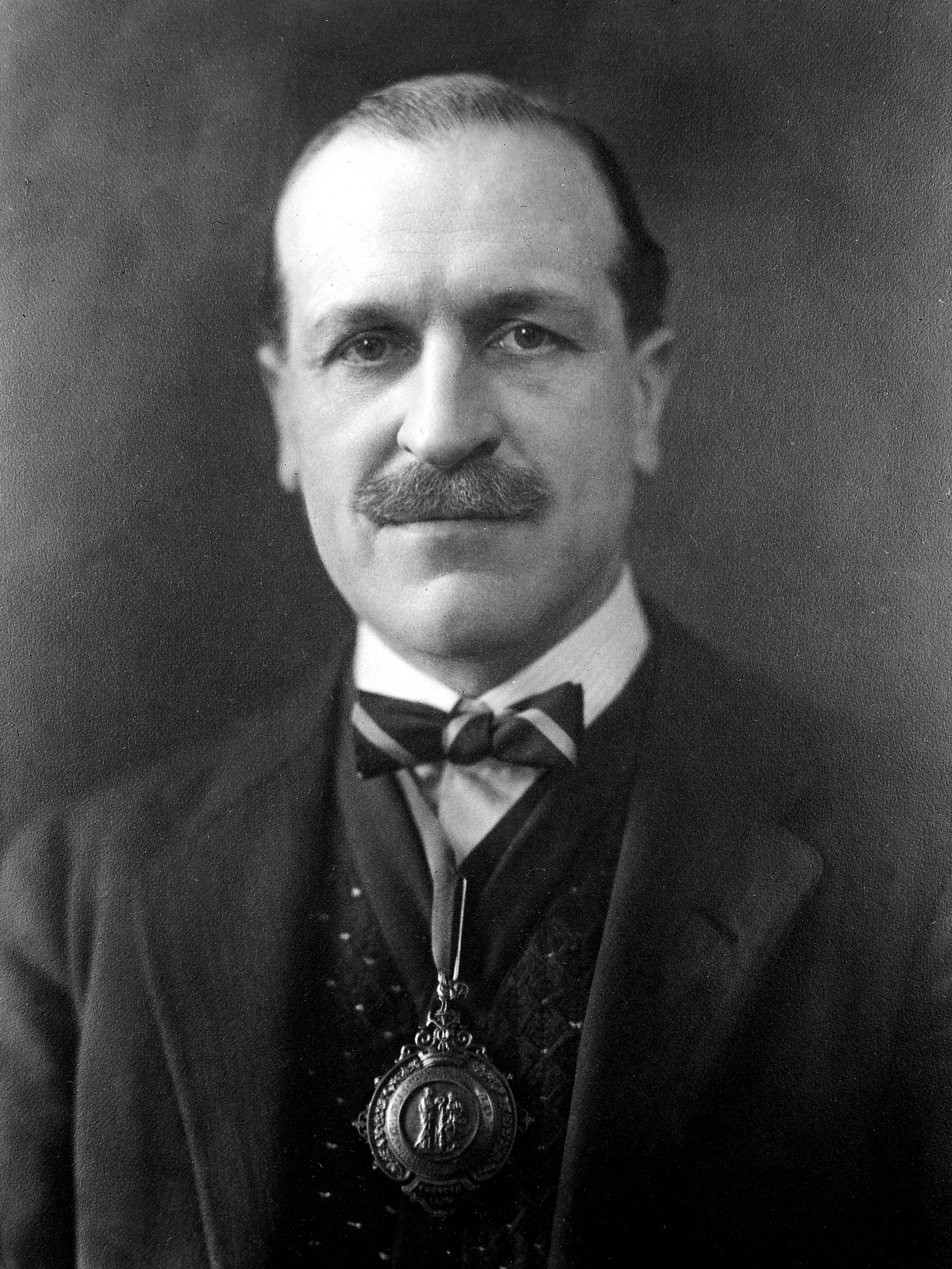

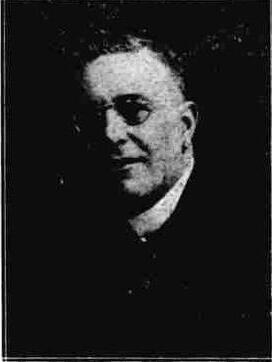
		Lab
Candidate	Francis Fremantle	John Brown	Milner Gray
Party	Unionist	Labour	Liberal
Alliance	Coalition
Popular vote	9,621	8,908	2,474
Percentage	45.8%	42.4%	11.8%
Swing	▼54.2%	New	New
MP before election
Hildred Carlile
Unionist
Subsequent MP
Francis Fremantle
Unionist

The 1919 St Albans by-election was a parliamentary by-election held in England in December 1919 for the UK House of Commons constituency of St Albans in Hertfordshire.

It was the first contested parliamentary election in St Albans since before World War I. Since the previous contest, in 1910, boundaries had been changed and the franchise extended.

The Coalition Unionists (i.e. Conservatives) held the seat, but by only a narrow margin over the Labour Party, even though Labour had existed in the area for less than 12 months, and St Albans had previously been a Conservative safe seat.

== Vacancy ==
The by-election was held to fill the vacancy caused when the 67-year-old Conservative Party Member of Parliament (MP) Sir Hildred Carlile resigned from the House of Commons on 20 November 1919 by the procedural device of accepting appointment as Steward of the Manor of Northstead. Carlile, who had held the seat since the 1906 general election (and was returned unopposed in 1918), cited ill-health as the reason for his departure from politics.

== Electoral history ==
The result at the last General Election in 1918 was;

1918 general election
Party		Candidate	Votes	%
C	Unionist	Hildred Carlile	Unopposed	
	Unionist win (new boundaries)			
C indicates candidate endorsed by the coalition government.

The previous election was contested and produced this result:

General election, December 1910
Party	Candidate	Votes	%	±%
Unionist	Hildred Carlile	6,899	59.1	+1.0
Liberal	R. C. Phillimore	4,777	40.9	−1.0
Majority		2,122	18.2	+2.0
Turnout		11,676	83.8	−6.6
Unionist hold		Swing	+1.0	

== Candidates ==
The Conservative Party selected as its candidate 47-year-old Lieutenant-Colonel Francis Fremantle, who had previously been adopted as the party's candidate for the next general election, when Hildred Carlile was expected to retire. Fremantle was an army doctor who had served in the Second Boer War and in World War I, and had been a member of the London County Council since March 1919. The son of a Dean of Ripon, he had been a medical officer for Hertfordshire for 14 years.

Early reports suggested that the Liberal Party candidate would be a Major Conacher from New Barnet, but in the event the Liberals nominated Milner Gray, a company director who had stood unsuccessfully in Wellingborough at the 1918 general election.

The Labour Party candidate was John W. Brown, the secretary of the Shipping Clerks' Guild.

The Times reported on 28 November that there was "possibility, but not a probability" of a fourth candidate, from the right-wing National Party, but this did not materialise.

Nominations closed on 2 December, with polling set for 10 December.

== Electorate ==
The old parliamentary borough of St Albans, which returned two MPs, had been disenfranchised in 1852 after a Royal Commission had found proof of extensive bribery. Deprived of its independent representation, the borough had then been represented as part of the three-seat Hertfordshire a county constituency. When the county constituency was divided in 1885, four new single-member county divisions were created, named after the major town in each area: the St Albans division was one of them, initially including the areas of High Barnet, Borehamwood, Elstree, Welwyn, Wheathampstead, and Harpenden. It had returned Conservative MPs at every opportunity since the 1885 general election, apart from a two-year interlude when the Liberal Party won a by-election in 1904.

However, the last contested election in the constituency had been in December 1910, and the electorate had changed significantly in 1918. The Representation of the People Act 1918 had nearly tripled the electorate nationally by expanding the franchise to include all adult men and women over 30 who met certain conditions, while boundary changes in the same Act had seen Radlett, Hemel Hempstead and Harpenden moved out of the constituency, Radlett and Hemel Hemsptead having been seen as Conservative strongholds. The result was an increase from 13,929 electors when the seat was last contested in December 1910 to 23,885 at the by-election: a constituency shorn of some of the support base of the incumbent party, where most of the electors would be voting for the first time.

There was a large agricultural sector in the constituency, and major residential areas in the towns of St Albans and at Barnet. Labour looked for its support to the railway-dominated town of Hatfield and amongst workers in Barnet and St Albans.

== Campaign ==
For the Liberals, Gray campaigned for free trade to combat high prices and increase production. He wanted to see an end to government control, and opposed the Anti-Dumping Bill, which he described as a measure to foster higher prices.

Fremantle's main theme was "peace at home". He backed the Government of Ireland Bill, and hoped for cross-party backing for it, but noted that since the Coalition Government had left "no organised opposition worth speaking of" in the House of Commons, the government "must receive its criticism from the inside". He pledged an independent attitude.

Brown sought the support of manual workers and trade unionists, particularly amongst the employees of the Great Northern Railway and the Midland Railway. However, he also targeted non-manual workers such as teachers, clerks and city employees who had been hard-hit by profiteering during the war.

All three candidates were supported by high-profile speakers. The former Home Secretary Herbert Samuel spoke for Gray, while Nancy Astor came to back Fremantle, who also received a letter of support from the Conservative leader Bonar Law. Brown was joined by the dramatist and Fabian George Bernard Shaw, and by the former ministers Sir Leo Chiozza Money and Arthur Henderson.

However, The Times noted on 1 December that although all three candidates were extremely active, "it cannot be said that the electorate are showing the amount of interest that might be desired". In the early days of contest, Liberal meetings were disrupted by hecklers, but this died away as the campaign progressed. The Times reported on 5 December that indoor meetings were the most successful; open-air speakers received a tiny audience.

== Result ==
After polling on 10 December, the result was not announced until 23 December, when the Unionist Fremantle was declared the winner with 45.8% of the votes, closely followed by Labour's Brown with 42.4%. Gray lost his deposit of £150, because his 11.8% Liberal share of votes fell below the threshold of one-eight of the votes.

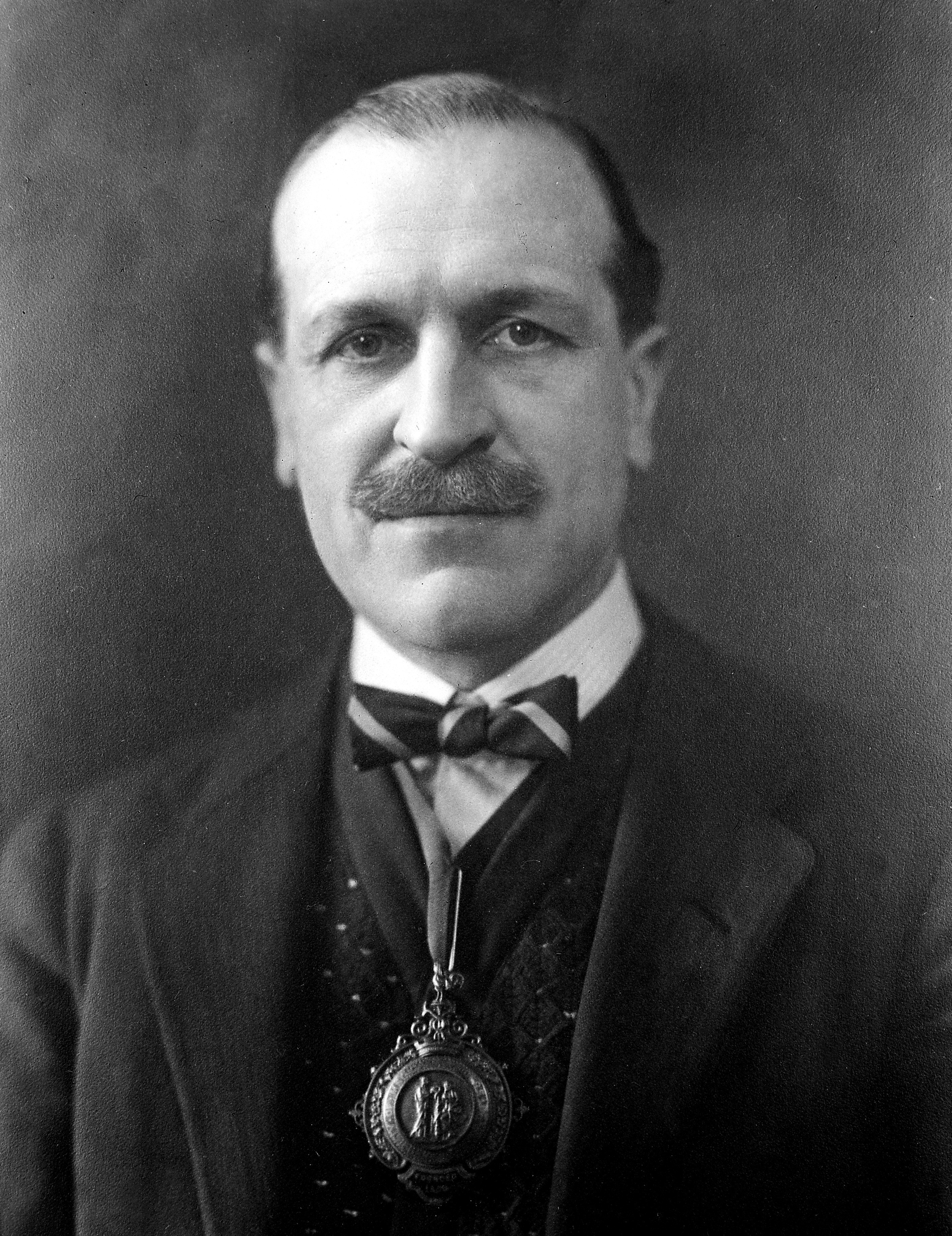
F.E. Fremantle

December 1919 St Albans by-election
Party		Candidate	Votes	%	±%
C	Unionist	Francis Fremantle	9,621	45.8	N/A
	Labour	John W. Brown	8,908	42.4	New
	Liberal	Milner Gray	2,474	11.8	New
Majority			713	3.4	N/A
Turnout			21,003	62.8	N/A
Registered electors			33,437		
	Unionist hold		Swing	N/A	
C indicates candidate endorsed by the coalition government.

In speeches after the count, Fremantle pronounced himself pleased with the result, and said that voters had sent a message of support to the Coalition for carrying on government "in accordance with the great traditions of the British Empire". Brown said that he was delighted with the result, which showed that the professional classes were coming round to supporting Labour; and Gray said that he could take defeat in a sportsmanlike manner.

== Aftermath ==
After his by-election victory, Fremantle held the seat at the following General Election in 1922.

1922 general election
Party	Candidate	Votes	%	±%
Unionist	Francis Fremantle	14,594	57.8	+12.0
Labour	John William Brown	10,662	42.2	−0.2
Majority		3,932	15.6	+12.2
Turnout		25,256	71.1	+8.3
Registered electors		35,520		
Unionist hold		Swing	+6.1	

He kept it for the next 24 years, until his death in August 1943. He spoke frequently on medical issues in Parliament, and was knighted in 1922. The slim Unionist majority at the by-election was not repeated: a 15.6% margin at the 1922 general election was followed by a 21.2% majority in 1923, and in 1931 Frematle's majority was a massive 56.2%. St Albans remained a safe seat for the Conservatives until it was narrowly won by Labour in 1945.

Gray contested Bedford unsuccessfully in 1923, but won the Mid Bedfordshire seat at the 1929 general election. He served briefly as a junior minister in 1931, but lost his seat at the 1931 general election, and never returned to Parliament. He served as Chairman of the Executive Committee of the Liberal Party for 6 years, was made a CBE in 1937.

== See also ==
- List of United Kingdom by-elections
- St Albans constituency
- 1943 St Albans by-election
- 1904 St Albans by-election
