= John W. Brown (British trade unionist) =

British trade union leader and political activist

John William Brown (born 1886) was a British trade union leader and political activist. He came to greatest prominence as general secretary of the International Federation of Trade Unions (IFTU).

Brown attended Christchurch School in Barnet, then Luton Technical School, followed by Ruskin College, from which he received a Diploma in Economic and Physical Science, validated by the University of Oxford. In 1919, he became the secretary of the Shipping Clerks' Guild, a trade union.

Brown also became active in the Labour Party, and stood as its candidate in the 1919 St Albans by-election. Campaigning among railway workers, and also non-manual workers who he believed had been hit by profiteering during the war, he won 42.4% of the vote, a surprisingly close second place. He stood again in the 1922 United Kingdom general election, dropping back only slightly, to 42.2% of the votes cast.

Brown's trade union career progressed rapidly, as he was elected as vice-chairman of the National Federation of Professional Workers, then in 1923 as assistant secretary of the International Federation of Trade Unions. The Trades Union Congress (TUC) were unhappy that he was junior to non-British officers, and in August succeeded to having him promoted to become joint general secretary.

In 1927, Brown uncovered evidence which, he claimed, showed that European trade unions were intriguing against the British unions, which wished to bring Russian trade unions into the organisation. The TUC argued that Brown should be elected as sole general secretary, but this was not accepted. In the face of an impasse, both Brown and another general secretary, Jan Oudegeest, chose to resign.

Trade union offices
Preceded by Edo Fimmen; Jan Oudegeest; Johannes Sassenbach	General Secretary of the International Federation of Trade Unions; 1923–1927; With: Edo Fimmen (1923); Jan Oudegeest; Johannes Sassenbach	Succeeded by Johannes Sassenbach
