= Thomas Aston (MP) =

English politician

Thomas Aston (died 1412/13) was an English politician. He sat as MP for Staffordshire in January 1380, April 1384, September 1388, 1393, 1399, and 1406.

== Offices held ==
He also served as assessor of a tax in Staffordshire in May 1379.

He also served as commissioner to arrest malefactors in Staffordshire in June 1380; commissioner to put down the rebels of 1381 in March 1382; commissioner of inquiry concerning illegal sale of wine in Stafford in November 1382 and March 1383, concerning murder in November 1383, April 1388, November 1390, and December 1390, concerning regrating and forestalling in Staffordshire and Warwickshire in April 1391, in Calais temple under Richard II concerning delapidations, concerning concealment of royal revenues in Staffordshire and Shropshire in June 1406, concerning abuses at the King's chapel at Tattenhall in Cheshire in February 1411, September 1411, and November 1411; commissioner to suppress treasonous rumours in Staffordshire in May 1402; and commissioner to raise a royal loan in Staffordshire and Shropshire in June 1406.

He also served as forester of Cannock Chase in Staffordshire by June 1385; justice of the peace of Staffordshire from 28 May 1386 till November 1389, 28 June 1390 till November 1397, 28 November 1399 till February 1406; collector of a royal aid in Staffordshire in December 1401; collector of taxes in Staffordshire in March 1404.

He also served as treasurer of the household of Edmund, Earl of Stafford by Michaelmas 1402 till before Michaelmas 1405 and sheriff of Staffordshire from Michaelmas 1409 till 29 November 1410.

== Family ==
He was the son of Sir Roger Aston by his wife Isabel. By October 1385, he was married to Elizabeth Cloddeshall, the widow of Sir William Devereux and they had at least one son, Sir Roger Aston.
