= John Grimston, 6th Earl of Verulam =

British peer and Conservative Member of Parliament (1912–1973)

The Right Honourable The Earl of Verulam

Member of the House of Lords Lord Temporal
- In office 13 October 1960 – 15 April 1973; Hereditary Peerage
- Preceded by: The 5th Earl of Verulam
- Succeeded by: The 7th Earl of Verulam

Member of Parliament for St Albans
- In office 23 February 1950 – 8 October 1959
- Preceded by: Cyril Dumpleton
- Succeeded by: Victor Goodhew
- In office 6 October 1943 – 5 July 1945
- Preceded by: Francis Fremantle
- Succeeded by: Cyril Dumpleton

Personal details
- Born: 17 July 1912
- Died: 15 April 1973 (aged 60 years)
- Party: Conservative
- Education: Christ Church, Oxford

John Grimston, 6th Earl of Verulam (17 July 1912 – 15 April 1973), styled the Honourable John Grimston until 1960, was an aristocratic Conservative Member of Parliament (MP) later becoming a member of the House of Lords.

== Early life and education ==
Born in 1912 at St Albans, Hertfordshire, the second son of James Grimston, 4th Earl of Verulam and his wife Lady Violet Constance Maitland Brabazon, youngest daughter of Reginald Brabazon, 12th Earl of Meath, he was educated at Oundle School and Christ Church, Oxford.

Grimston was a tobacco farmer in Southern Rhodesia for two years before becoming director and general manager of Enfield Rolling Mills in 1938.

== Royal Air Force ==
Grimston joined the Royal Air Force Reserve of Officers in 1930 as a pilot being injured in an aircraft accident in 1933. In 1937 he was commissioned as a Flight Lieutenant in the Royal Auxiliary Air Force and served in Coastal Command during the Second World War.

== Political career ==
The Hon. John Grimston was elected to the House of Commons as MP for St Albans at the by-election in 1943, but was defeated at the 1945 general election by the Labour candidate Cyril Dumpleton. However, he regained the seat at the 1950 general election, which he held until he retired from the House of Commons at the 1959 general election.

Succeeding to the earldom upon his elder brother's death in 1960, he sat in the House of Lords until his death in 1973.

== Marriage and children ==
He married in 1938 Marjorie Ray Duncan (died 1994), daughter of Walter Atholl Duncan (son of Pre-Raphaelite painter Walter Duncan) and wife Clara Ray Parks, maternal aunt of Iona Campbell, Duchess of Argyll and sister-in-law of David Lockhart-Mure Renton, Baron Renton.
The Earl and Countess of Verulam had five children:

- Lady Elizabeth Harriot Grimston (31 August 1939 - 1987), married (divorced 1972) John Savile, 8th Earl of Mexborough, having two children.
- Lady Hermione Frances Grimston (born 27 September 1941)
- Lady Romayne Bryony Grimston (born 18 August 1946)
- John Duncan Grimston, 7th Earl of Verulam (born 21 April 1951)
- Lady Iona Charlotte Grimston (born 25 October 1953), married Henry, 8th Marquess Conyngham, having one daughter.

== Death ==
Lord Verulam died in 1973, at the age of 60, and was succeeded in the earldom and other family titles by his only son John as 7th Earl of Verulam.

== Notes ==
Parliament of the United Kingdom
Preceded by Sir Francis Edward Fremantle	Member of Parliament for St Albans; 1943–1945	Succeeded by Cyril Dumpleton
Preceded by Cyril Dumpleton	Member of Parliament for St Albans; 1950–1959	Succeeded by Sir Victor Goodhew
Peerage of the United Kingdom
Preceded by James Brabazon Grimston	Earl of Verulam; 1960–1973	Succeeded by John Duncan Grimston
