= Robert Stepneth =

16th-century English politician

Robert Stepneth or Stepney (by 1513 – 1557) was an English politician.

He was a member (MP) of the parliament of England for St. Albans in 1555.
