= John Gape =

English politician (1652–1734)

John Gape (1652 – 7 May 1734) was an English Tory politician and lawyer. He sat as MP for St. Albans from 19 March 1701 till 24 November 1705, 1708 till 1713, and 27 April 1714 till 1715.

== Family and education ==
He was baptised on 26 August 1652. He was the second son and heir of John Gape. He entered Lincoln's Inn in 1672 and was called to the bar in 1682. On 1 December 1679, he married Susan (died 1720), the daughter of Thomas Cowley with £2000. They had six sons (five predeceased him), and five daughters (four predeceased him).

== Parliamentary career ==
In the first election of 1701, he contested St. Albans he was defeated and petitioned the election, the election was voided for bribery and Gape was returned at a new poll. He was re-elected in the second election of 1701. In July 1702, he was re-elected. In 1705, he was returned but unseated on petition. In 1708, he was re-elected MP. In 1710, he was re-elected MP. In the 1713 election, he was defeated by William Hale and petitioned the result. He was successfully seated in Parliament on 27 April 1714 after the petition. In 1715, he did not stand again and withdrew from politics.
