= Thomas Ashby (MP) =

English politician

Thomas Ashby (died c. 1435) was an English politician. He sat as MP for Leicestershire in April 1414 and 1419.

He also served as commissioner to assess subsidies in Leicestershire in January 1412 and commissioner to raise royal loans in November 1419 and justice of the peace in Leicestershire from 12 February 1422 till October 1432.

He was the son and heir of Richard Ashby by Agnes, the daughter of William Breedon and sister and heiress of Ralph Breedon. He married Joan, who was probably the daughter and heiress of John Burdet and they had one son.
