= Grimston =

Grimston may refer to:

== Places ==
- Grimston, East Riding of Yorkshire, near Withernsea, England
- Grimston, Leicestershire, England
- Grimston, Norfolk, England
- Grimston, Nottinghamshire, England
- Grimston (near Tadcaster), the location of Grimston Park, near Kirby Wharfe, North Yorkshire, England
- Grimston, York, east of York city centre, North Yorkshire
- Grimstone, North Yorkshire, a separate village near Gilling, England, sometimes referred to as "Grimston"

== People ==
- Baron Grimston of Westbury, a title in the Peerage of the United Kingdom
- Doug Grimston (1900–1955), Canadian ice hockey administrator
- Edward Grimston (disambiguation)
- James Grimston (disambiguation)
- Grimston baronets
- Robert Grimston (disambiguation)
- Viscount Grimston, a title in the Peerage of the United Kingdom

== Other uses ==
- Grimston Hall, 17th–18th century home of the Barker baronets, Suffolk, England
- Grimston Manor, a manor house in Norfolk, England
- Grimston railway station, Saxelbye village, Leicestershire, English

== See also ==
- Grimstone (disambiguation)
