= James Grimston =

James Grimston may refer to:

- James Grimston, 2nd Viscount Grimston (1711–1773), British peer and Member of Parliament
- James Grimston, 3rd Viscount Grimston (1747–1808), British peer and Member of Parliament
- James Grimston, 1st Earl of Verulam (1775–1845), British peer and Member of Parliament
- James Grimston, 2nd Earl of Verulam (1809–1895), British peer and Conservative politician
- James Grimston, 3rd Earl of Verulam (1852–1924), British peer and Conservative Member of Parliament
- James Grimston, 4th Earl of Verulam (1880–1949), British peer, electrical engineer and businessman
- James Grimston, 5th Earl of Verulam (1910–1960), British peer and businessman

== See also ==
- Grimston (disambiguation)
