= Dione Grimston, Countess of Verulam =

English painter

The Right Honourable The Countess of Verulam LL
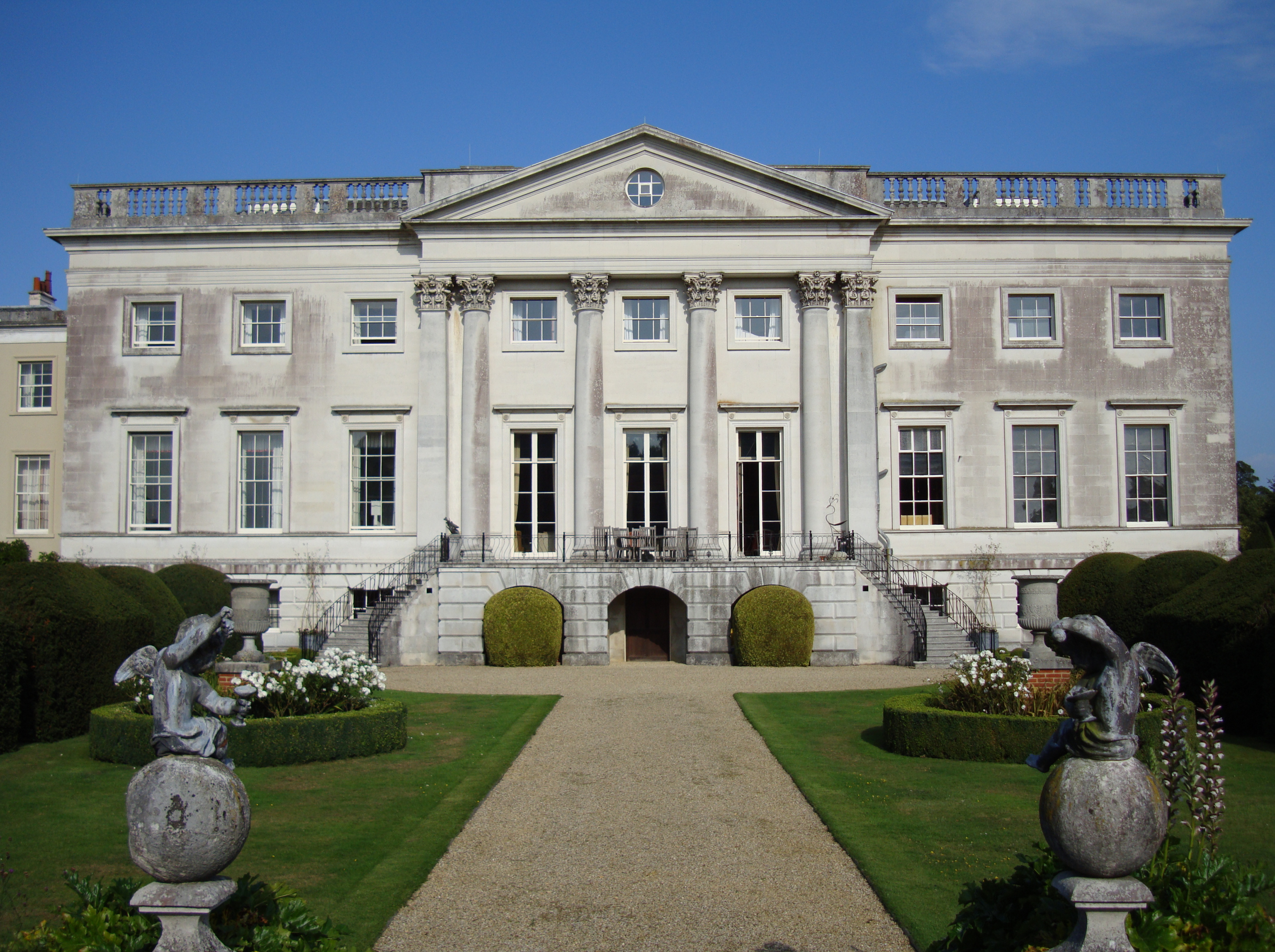
- Gorhambury House, the family seat
- Born: Dione Angela Smith; 19 July 1954 (age 72)
- Occupation: Artist
- Spouse: John Grimston, 7th Earl of Verulam
- Children: James Grimston, Viscount Grimston; The Hon. Hugo Grimston; Lady Flora Grimston; The Hon. Sam Grimston
- Parent(s): Jeremy Smith; Julia Burrell
- Website: Official website

Dione Angela Grimston, Countess of Verulam, CVO (née Smith; born 19 July 1954) is a British artist and former Lord Lieutenant of Hertfordshire.

The daughter of Jeremy Smith and Julia Burrell, she is maternally granddaughter of Sir Walter Burrell, 8th Baronet. She married John Grimston, 7th Earl of Verulam, on 12 September 1976. Lord and Lady Verulam have four children:

- James Grimston, Viscount Grimston (b. 6 January 1978)
- Hon. Hugo Guy Sylvester Grimston (b. 5 November 1979)
- Lady Flora Grimston (b. 28 September 1981)
- Hon. Sam George John Grimston (b. 18 October 1983)

The Countess of Verulam served as High Sheriff of Hertfordshire in 2002 and was appointed Lord Lieutenant of Hertfordshire in June 2007 following the retirement of Sir Simon Bowes-Lyon. She served until July 2017 and was the first woman to hold that office. She was succeeded by Robert Voss. She was appointed Commander of the Royal Victorian Order (CVO) in the 2019 Birthday Honours.

Lady Verulam has worked on churches, Cliveden Hall and Hambleton Hall, and has exhibited her paintings in two solo exhibitions at the Rebecca Hossack Gallery in London. She is the patron of Home-Start St Albans. A keen artist, Lady Verulam specialises in collages and has her works exhibited in collections across the UK, America, Switzerland and Spain.

Honorary titles
Preceded by Sir Christopher Laing	High Sheriff of Hertfordshire; 2002	Succeeded by Susanna, Lady Lyell of Markyate
Preceded by Sir Simon Bowes-Lyon	Lord Lieutenant of Hertfordshire; 2007–2017	Succeeded by Robert Voss
