= Verulam =

Verulam may refer to:

== People ==
- Baron Verulam
- Earl of Verulam

== Places ==
- Verulam, KwaZulu-Natal
- Verulam Township, Ontario
- Common abbreviation of Verulamium, third-largest city in Roman Britain, near modern-day St Albans

== Other ==
- Radio Verulam, a community radio station in West Hertfordshire
- HMS Verulam (ship)
- Verulam School, state secondary school in St Albans, England

== See also ==
- Verulamium
