= Harbottle Grimston =

Harbottle Grimston may refer to:

- Sir Harbottle Grimston, 1st Baronet (c. 1569–1648), MP
- Sir Harbottle Grimston, 2nd Baronet (1603–1685), MP

== See also ==
- Grimston baronets
- Grimston (disambiguation)
