= Grimstone =

Grimstone may refer to:

== Places ==
- Grimstone, Dorset, England
- Grimstone, North Yorkshire, England

== Other ==
- Grimstone (surname)
- Grimstone, one game found within the 2024 compilation game UFO 50

== See also ==
- Grimston (disambiguation)
