= William Grimston =

English politician

William Grimston (1750–1814) was an English politician. From 1797 he was known as William Bucknall.

== Life ==
He was the second son of James Grimston, 2nd Viscount Grimston and his wife Mary Bucknall, and the younger brother of James Grimston, 3rd Viscount Grimston. He was born at Gorhambury in Hertfordshire, and was educated at Eton College and Christ's College, Cambridge, matriculating in 1768 and graduating M.A. in 1770.

Grimston was admitted to Lincoln's Inn in 1767. He became Member of Parliament for St Albans in 1784, filling the place of his brother James (who, as an Irish peer, could sit in the House of Commons); James Grimston withdrew as a candidate on polling day and William took the seat. He generally supported the ministry. In the 1790 general election, he stepped aside, in favour of John Calvert. In 1791 he was elected again, for Appleby, remaining in parliament to 1795.

On 21 January 1797, Grimston changed his surname to Bucknall, fulfilling a condition in the will of his uncle John Askell Bucknall. He died on 25 April 1814.

== Family ==
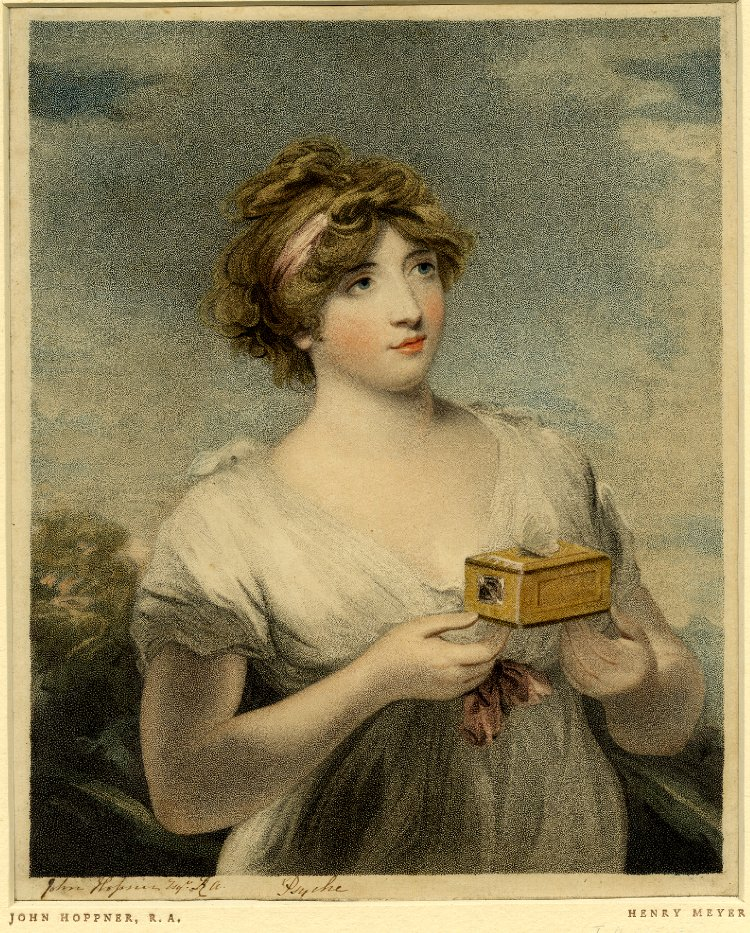
Grimston's only daughter Sophia, who married Berkeley Paget, painted as "Psyche" by Henry Hoppner Meyer

Grimston married in 1783 Sophia Hoare, daughter of Richard Hoare of Boreham, Essex, a banker and grandson of Richard Hoare (1648–1719), and of Susanna Cecilia Dingley (1743–1795). They had a daughter, Sophia Askell (1784–1859), who had a court position as woman of the bedchamber to Adelaide of Saxe-Meiningen. She married in 1804 the Honorable Berkeley Paget, a younger son of Henry Paget, 1st Earl of Uxbridge, by whom she had seven children. The other child of the marriage, John, died an infant.
