= HMS Verulam =

Two ships of the Royal Navy have borne the name HMS Verulam, probably after Francis Bacon, who was Baron Verulam, or other holders of the baronetage or earldom of Verulam:

- HMS Verulam (1917) was an Admiralty V-class destroyer launched in 1917 and sunk in 1919.
- HMS Verulam (R28) was a V-class destroyer launched in 1943. She was converted into a Type 15 fast anti-submarine frigate between 1951 and 1952, and was sold in 1972.
