= Baron Verulam =

Barony in the Peerage of Great Britain

The title Baron Verulam was created in two separate and unrelated instances:

- First as Baron Verulam, of Verulam, in the Peerage of England. It was firstly created for the English philosopher and statesman Sir Francis Bacon (who was also later created Viscount St Albans).
- Secondly as Baron Verulam, of Gorhambury in the County of Hertford in the Peerage of Great Britain. It was created for James Grimston, 3rd Viscount Grimston (whose viscountcy was in the Peerage of Ireland).

== Barons Verulam, first creation (1618) ==
- Francis Bacon, 1st Baron Verulam (1561–1626) (became Viscount St Albans in 1621)

== Barons Verulam, second creation (1790) ==
- William Grimston, 1st Viscount Grimston (c. 1683–1756)
- James Grimston, 2nd Viscount Grimston (1711–1773)
- James Bucknall Grimston, 3rd Viscount Grimston (1747–1808) (created Baron Verulam in 1790)
- James Walter Grimston, 4th Viscount Grimston (1775–1845) (created Earl of Verulam in 1815)

See Earl of Verulam for further holders.
