= Rosemary Peel =

- Born: February 27, 1910
- Died: July 10, 2008 (aged 98)
- Spouse(s): John Peel
- Awards: Order of Paduka Seri Laila Jasa, Second Class

Lady Datin Rosemary Peel DSLJ (February 27, 1910 – July 10, 2008) was a British woman who held titles from both the United Kingdom and Brunei.

== Life ==
Rosemary Mia Minka Redhead was born February 27, 1910, the daughter of Robert Redhead, a member of a family of South Shields shipbuilders, and Muriel Redhead, a suffragette. She was educated at North Foreland Lodge before attending Oxford University, where she studied at Lady Margaret Hall from 1930 to 1934 and earned an MA in modern languages.

In 1936, she married John Peel of the Colonial Service. She accompanied him to all of his Pacific postings, living in tin shacks and writing letters home about the poor conditions. His first posting was Pahang, Malaysia, then Singapore. Following the Japanese invasion of Singapore during World War II, John Peel became a prisoner of war, while Rosemary Peel and their two daughters were evacuated to Durban, South Africa aboard the RMS Empress of Japan.

Following the war, John Peel was posted to Brunei from 1946 to 1948. As British Resident in Brunei, he had good relations with the royal family and was such a close advisor that he later said essentially "I ran the government" of Brunei.

John Peel's last posting was to the remote Gilbert and Ellice Islands and he resigned in 1951 because the Colonial Service would no longer pay for children to visit their parents at field postings. He then ran for office, becoming the Member of Parliament for Leicester South East. Rosemary Peel was active on the campaign trail and employed her language skills on his behalf during visits to Europe.

Both Rosemary and her husband were honored by the government of Brunei with the Order of Paduka Seri Laila Jasa, allowing her to use the title Datin. When John Peel was knighted in 1973, she became Lady Peel.

Rosemary Peel died on 10 July 2008.

== Honours ==
Order of Paduka Seri Laila Jasa Second Class (DSLJ; 1970) – Dato Seri Laila Jasa
