= 1957 Leicester South East by-election =

UK Parliamentary by-election

The 1957 Leicester South East by-election was held on 28 November 1957. It was held due to the resignation of the incumbent Conservative MP, Charles Waterhouse. The by-election was won by the Conservative candidate John Peel whose only opponent was the future Speaker, Betty Boothroyd standing for the first time for Labour.

Leicester South East by-election, 1957
| Party | Candidate | Votes | % | ±% |
|---|---|---|---|---|
| Conservative | John Peel | 18,023 | 60.9 | −3.3 |
| Labour | Betty Boothroyd | 11,541 | 39.1 | +3.3 |
| Majority | | 6,482 | 21.8 | −6.6 |
| Turnout | | 29,564 | 56.3 | −22.2 |
| Conservative hold | | Swing | −6.0 | |
