= George Burns (British Army officer) =

British Army general

Major-General Sir George Burns GCVO CB DSO OBE MC KStJ
- Burns in 1966

Lord Lieutenant of Hertfordshire
- In office 1961–1986
- Preceded by: Sir David Bowes-Lyon
- Succeeded by: Sir Simon Bowes-Lyon

Personal details
- Born: Walter Arthur George Burns; 29 January 1911 London, England
- Died: 5 May 1997 (aged 86) Hatfield, Hertfordshire, England
- Relations: William George Cavendish-Bentinck (grandfather)
- Education: Trinity College, Cambridge

Military service
- Allegiance: United Kingdom
- Branch/service: British Army
- Years of service: 1932–1962
- Rank: Major-General
- Unit: Coldstream Guards
- Commands: London District; 4th Guards Brigade; 3rd Battalion, Coldstream Guards
- Battles/wars: Second World War; Palestine Emergency

Major-General Sir Walter Arthur George Burns, GCVO, CB, DSO, OBE, MC, KStJ (29 January 1911 – 5 May 1997) was a British Army officer and native of Hertfordshire.

== Personal life ==
=== Early life ===
Burns was born on 29 January 1911 to art collector Walter Spencer Morgan Burns (1872–1929), and Ruth Evelyn Cavendish-Bentinck (1883–1978), who married in 1907. His sister was Cynthia Mary Burns, the first wife of Sir John Carew Pole, 12th Baronet.

His father was a nephew of the prominent American banker J. P. Morgan and a grandson of Junius Spencer Morgan. His maternal grandparents were American heiress Elizabeth Livingston Cavendish-Bentinck (a daughter of Maturin Livingston Jr.) and William George Cavendish-Bentinck MP (a son of George Cavendish-Bentinck MP). Through his sister, he was an uncle to Sir Richard Carew Pole, 13th Baronet.

Burns was educated at Eton and Trinity College, Cambridge.

=== Inheritance and estates ===
Burns initiated a major sale of the contents of his North Mymms Park estate in 1979; the proceeds of the sale of the house's contents were approximately £2,400,000. The House was also sold to an overseas buyer during the same year.

== Military career ==
He obtained a commission in the Coldstream Guards in 1932, and served as aide-de-camp to the Viceroy of India, the Marquess of Linlithgow from 1938 to 1940.

He then held several staff posts during the Second World War: adjutant of the 1st Battalion Coldstream Guards from 1940 to 1941 (in which service he received the Military Cross), brigade major of the 9th Infantry Brigade from 1941 to 1942, Support Group Guards Armoured Division in 1942 and 32nd Guards Brigade from 1942 to 1943.

Post-war, Burns commanded the 3rd Battalion of the Coldstream Guards in Palestine, during the Palestine Emergency, from 1947 until 1950. He then served as Assistant Adjutant General at the London District Headquarters 1951 to 1952, as lieutenant colonel of the Coldstream 1952 to 1955, as commander of the 4th Guards Brigade 1955 to 1959, and as Major-General commanding the Household Brigade and General Officer Commanding London District from 1959 to 1962. In 1962, he was made a Knight Commander of the Royal Victorian Order and received the colonelcy of the Coldstream, which he held until 1994. The previous year, he had been appointed Lord Lieutenant of Hertfordshire and served in that office for the next 25 years.

Burns was a patron of cricket, serving as President of the North Mymms Cricket Club from 1931 until his death. He lived at North Mymms Park.

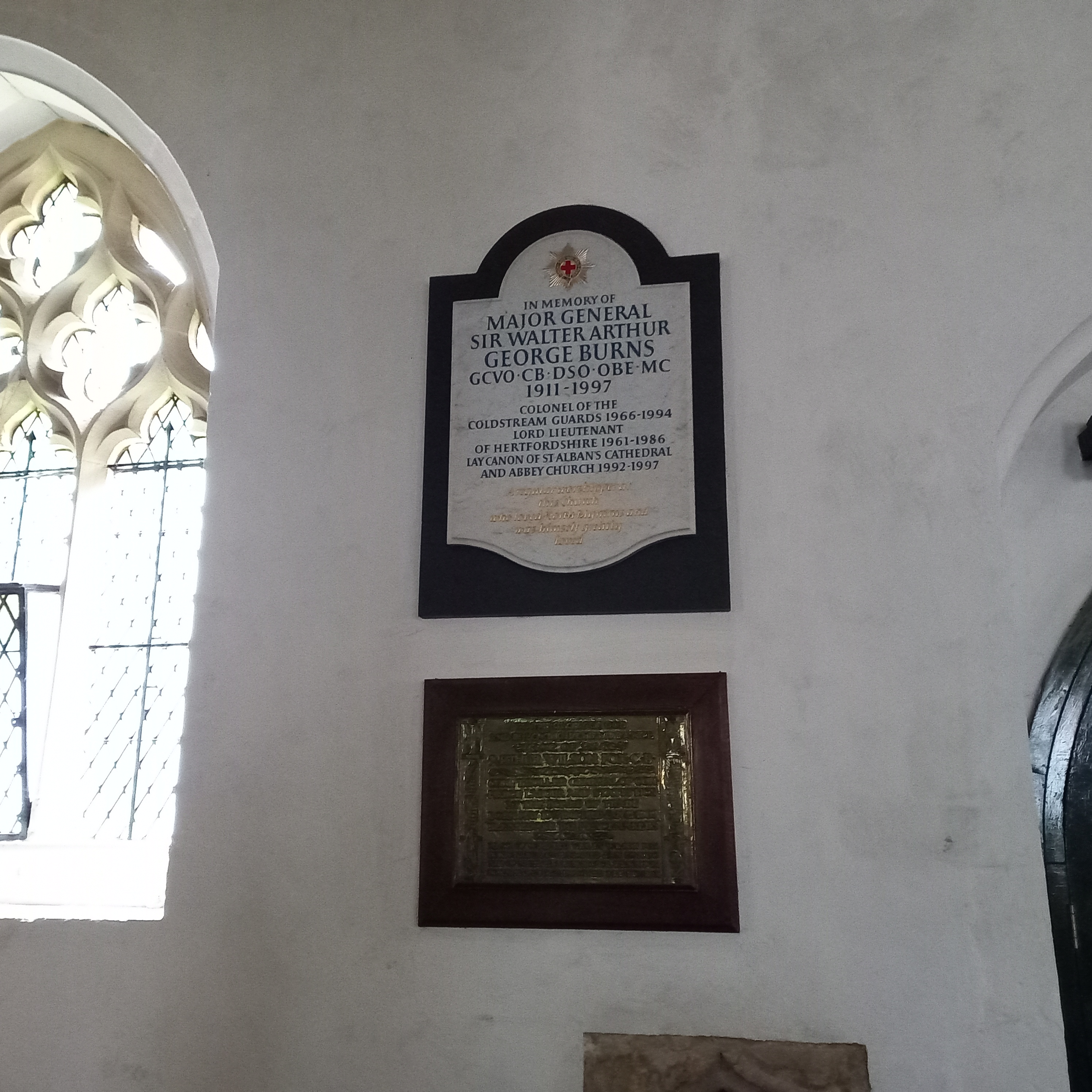
Monument to Sir George Burns at St Mary the Virgin's Church, North Mymms.

=== Legacy and honours ===
Burns was a Knight Grand Cross of the Royal Victorian Order, a Companion of the Order of the Bath, a Companion of the Distinguished Service Order, an Officer of the Order of the British Empire, a recipient of the Military Cross, and a Knight of Justice of the Order of Saint John.

Military offices
Preceded by Sir Rodney Moore	GOC London District; 1959–1962	Succeeded by Sir John Nelson
Honorary titles
Preceded by Sir Charles Loyd	Colonel of the Coldstream Guards; 1966–1994	Succeeded by Sir William Rous
Preceded by Sir David Bowes-Lyon	Lord Lieutenant of Hertfordshire; 1961–1986	Succeeded by Sir Simon Bowes-Lyon
