= Simon Bowes-Lyon =

British nobleman

Sir Simon Bowes-Lyon KCVO FCA

Lord Lieutenant of Hertfordshire
- In office 1986–2007
- Monarch: Elizabeth II
- Preceded by: Sir George Burns
- Succeeded by: The Countess of Verulam

Personal details
- Born: Simon Alexander Bowes-Lyon; 17 June 1932 (age 94)
- Spouse: Caroline Pike (m. 1966)
- Children: 4
- Parents: Sir David Bowes-Lyon (father); Rachel Spender-Clay (mother)
- Education: Eton College
- Alma mater: Magdalen College, Oxford (MA)

Sir Simon Alexander Bowes-Lyon (born 17 June 1932) is a British businessman who served as Lord Lieutenant of Hertfordshire from 1986 to 2007. He is a maternal first cousin of Elizabeth II.

== Early life and family ==
Bowes-Lyon was born in 1932, the son of The Hon. Sir David Bowes-Lyon (1902–1961) and Rachel Pauline Spender-Clay (1907–1996). His father was the sixth son and tenth child of Claude, 14th Earl of Strathmore and Kinghorne. His mother was the daughter of Herbert Spender-Clay and Pauline Astor. He had one sister, Davina, who married the 13th Earl of Stair.

On 11 April 1966, he married Caroline Mary Victoria Pike (born 27 September 1940), daughter of Victor Pike, and they have four children. He resides at St Paul's Walden Bury, the reputed birthplace of his aunt, Queen Elizabeth The Queen Mother.

== Career ==
Bowes-Lyon was educated at Eton College and graduated from Magdalen College, Oxford with a Master of Arts. He is a fellow the Institute of Chartered Accountants in England and Wales (FCA). He is president of the Bhutan Society of the United Kingdom.

On 12 November 1971, Bowes-Lyon was nominated as Sheriff of Hertfordshire in the Queen's Bench Division of the High Court of Justice, a position previously held by his father. He was nominated again in 1972. In 1974, when the Sheriff of Hertfordshire was retitled as High Sheriff under the provisions of the Local Government Act 1972, he was nominated again for 1974 and 1975.

Bowes-Lyon was appointed Lord Lieutenant of Hertfordshire on 12 February 1986, a position his father held from 1952–1961. He retired in 2007 and was succeeded by Dione Grimston, Countess of Verulam.

On 7 April 1995, he was appointed a Knight of the Order of St John (KStJ). He was appointed a Knight Commander of the Royal Victorian Order (KCVO) in 2005 Birthday Honours.

Honorary titles
Preceded by Sir George Burns	Lord Lieutenant of Hertfordshire; 1986–2007	Succeeded by The Countess of Verulam
