= Robert Grimston =

Robert Grimston may refer to:

- Robert Grimston, 1st Baron Grimston of Westbury (1897–1979), British politician
- Robert Grimston (cricketer) (1816–1884), English cricketer

== See also ==
- Robert de Grimston (born 1935), founder of The Process Church of The Final Judgment
