= Lord Lieutenant of Hertfordshire =

List of people who of held the position

This is an incomplete list of people who have served as Lord Lieutenant of Hertfordshire. From 1660 the office holder was also Custos Rotulorum of Hertfordshire.

- William Parr, 1st Marquess of Northampton 1553 –
- Sir Ralph Sadleir 1570–?
- Henry Carey, 1st Baron Hunsdon 1583–1585
- Robert Dudley, 1st Earl of Leicester 3 July 1585 – 4 September 1588
- William Cecil, 1st Baron Burghley 31 December 1588 – 4 August 1598
- vacant
- Robert Cecil, 1st Earl of Salisbury 5 August 1605 – 24 May 1612
- William Cecil, 2nd Earl of Salisbury 10 July 1612 – 1642 jointly with
- Charles Cecil, Viscount Cranborne 31 March 1640 – 1642
- Interregnum
- Arthur Capell, 1st Earl of Essex 26 July 1660 – 1681
- John Egerton, 2nd Earl of Bridgewater 10 February 1681 – 26 October 1686
- Laurence Hyde, 1st Earl of Rochester 18 November 1686 – 1688
- Charles Talbot, 1st Duke of Shrewsbury 4 April 1689 – 1691
- Algernon Capell, 2nd Earl of Essex 3 February 1692 – 10 January 1710
- William Cowper, 1st Earl Cowper 26 August 1710 – 1712
- James Cecil, 5th Earl of Salisbury 26 June 1712 – 1714
- William Cowper, 1st Earl Cowper 5 March 1715 – 1722
- William Capell, 3rd Earl of Essex 11 October 1722 – 8 January 1743
- vacant
- William Clavering-Cowper, 2nd Earl Cowper 8 March 1744 – 18 September 1764
- William Capell, 4th Earl of Essex 12 November 1764 – 1771
- James Cecil, 1st Marquess of Salisbury 13 March 1771 – 13 June 1823
- James Grimston, 1st Earl of Verulam 5 July 1823 – 17 November 1845
- James Grimston, 2nd Earl of Verulam 17 January 1846 – 1892
- Edward Villiers, 5th Earl of Clarendon 23 August 1892 – 2 October 1914
- Thomas Brand, 3rd Viscount Hampden 9 February 1915 – 1952
- Sir David Bowes-Lyon 1 July 1952 – 13 September 1961
- Sir George Burns 8 December 1961 – 12 February 1986
- Sir Simon Bowes-Lyon 12 February 1986 – 27 July 2007
- Dione Grimston, Countess of Verulam 27 July 2007 – 31 July 2017
- Robert Voss 4 August 2017 – present

== Deputy lieutenants ==
A deputy lieutenant of Hertfordshire is commissioned by the Lord Lieutenant of Hertfordshire. Deputy lieutenants support the work of the lord-lieutenant. There can be several deputy lieutenants at any time, depending on the population of the county. Their appointment does not terminate with the changing of the lord-lieutenant, but they usually retire at age 75.

- 1660 to 1682: Edward Harley
- 1662 to 1688: Humphrey Cornewall
- 1689 to 1700: Edward Harley
- 1694 to 1715: Thomas Harley

=== 21st Century ===
- 9 November 2009: Howard Anthony Guard
