= David Bowes-Lyon =

British nobleman (1902–1961)

The Honourable Sir David Bowes-Lyon KCVO
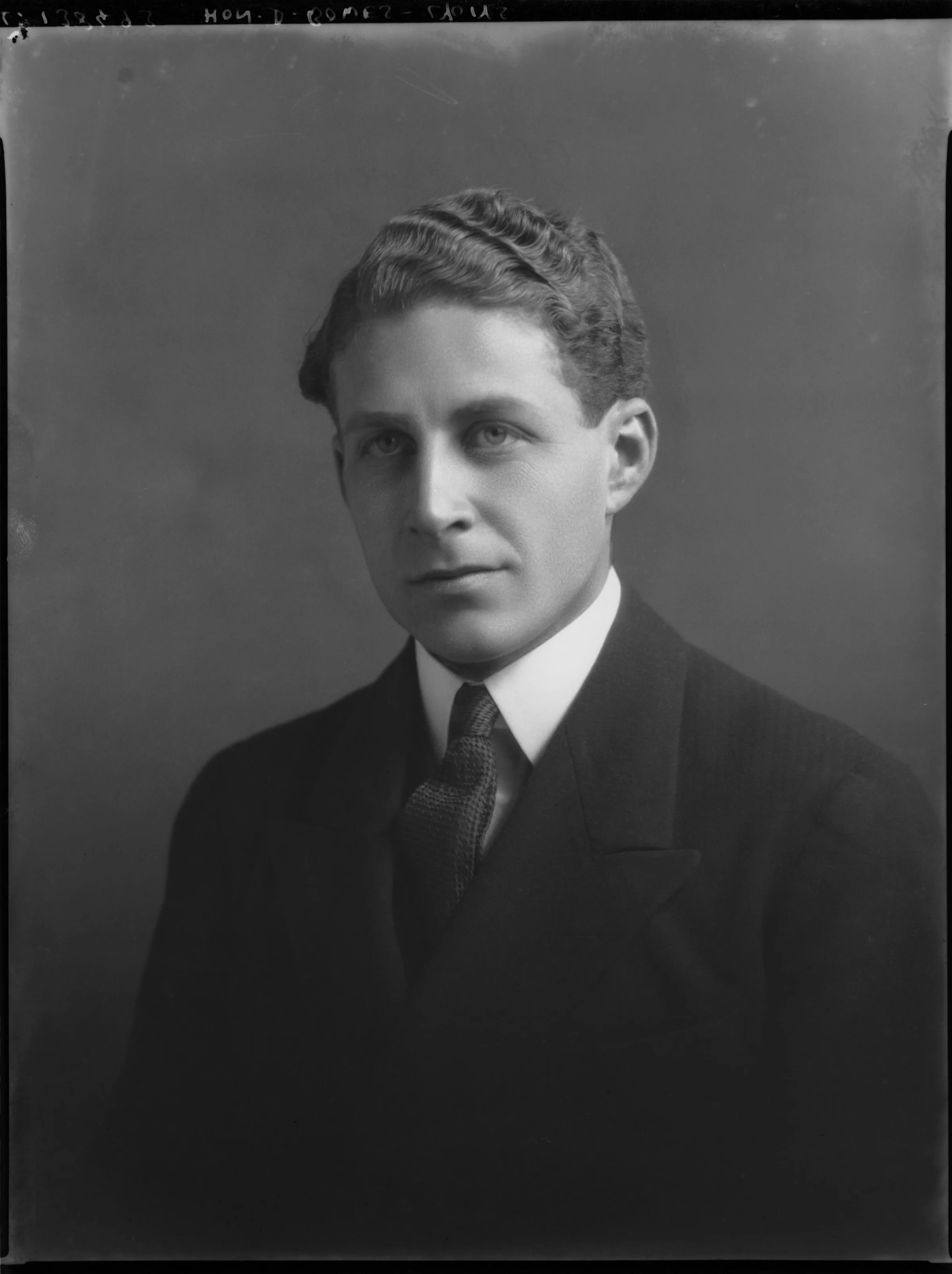
- Bowes-Lyon in 1928

High Sheriff of Hertfordshire
- In office 1950
- Monarch: George VI
- Prime Minister: Clement Attlee
- Preceded by: Walter Hugh Crosland
- Succeeded by: Sir William Acland, Bt

Lord Lieutenant of Hertfordshire
- In office 1952–1961
- Monarchs: George VI; Elizabeth II
- Prime Minister: Winston Churchill; Anthony Eden; Harold Macmillan
- Preceded by: The Viscount Hampden
- Succeeded by: Sir George Burns

Personal details
- Born: 2 May 1902
- Died: 13 September 1961 (aged 59) Birkhall, Royal Deeside, Aberdeenshire, Scotland
- Resting place: St. Paul's Walden Bury
- Spouse: Rachel Spender-Clay (m. 1929)
- Children: Davina Dalrymple, Countess of Stair; Simon Bowes-Lyon
- Parent(s): Claude Bowes-Lyon, 14th Earl of Strathmore and Kinghorne; Cecilia Cavendish-Bentinck
- Relatives: Queen Elizabeth the Queen Mother (sister); Elizabeth II (niece); Princess Margaret, Countess of Snowdon (niece)

Sir David Bowes-Lyon (2 May 1902 – 13 September 1961) was a British aristocrat who was the younger brother of Queen Elizabeth the Queen Mother and maternal uncle to Queen Elizabeth II.

== Early life ==
David Bowes-Lyon was born on 2 May 1902. He was the tenth and youngest child, and the sixth son, of Claude Bowes-Lyon, 14th Earl of Strathmore and Kinghorne, and Cecilia Cavendish-Bentinck.

His paternal grandparents were Claude Bowes-Lyon, 13th Earl of Strathmore and Kinghorne, and the former Frances Smith. His maternal grandparents were the Rev. Charles Cavendish-Bentinck (grandson of the British Prime Minister, the 3rd Duke of Portland) and his wife, Louisa Burnaby (a daughter of courtier Edwyn Burnaby).

== Career ==
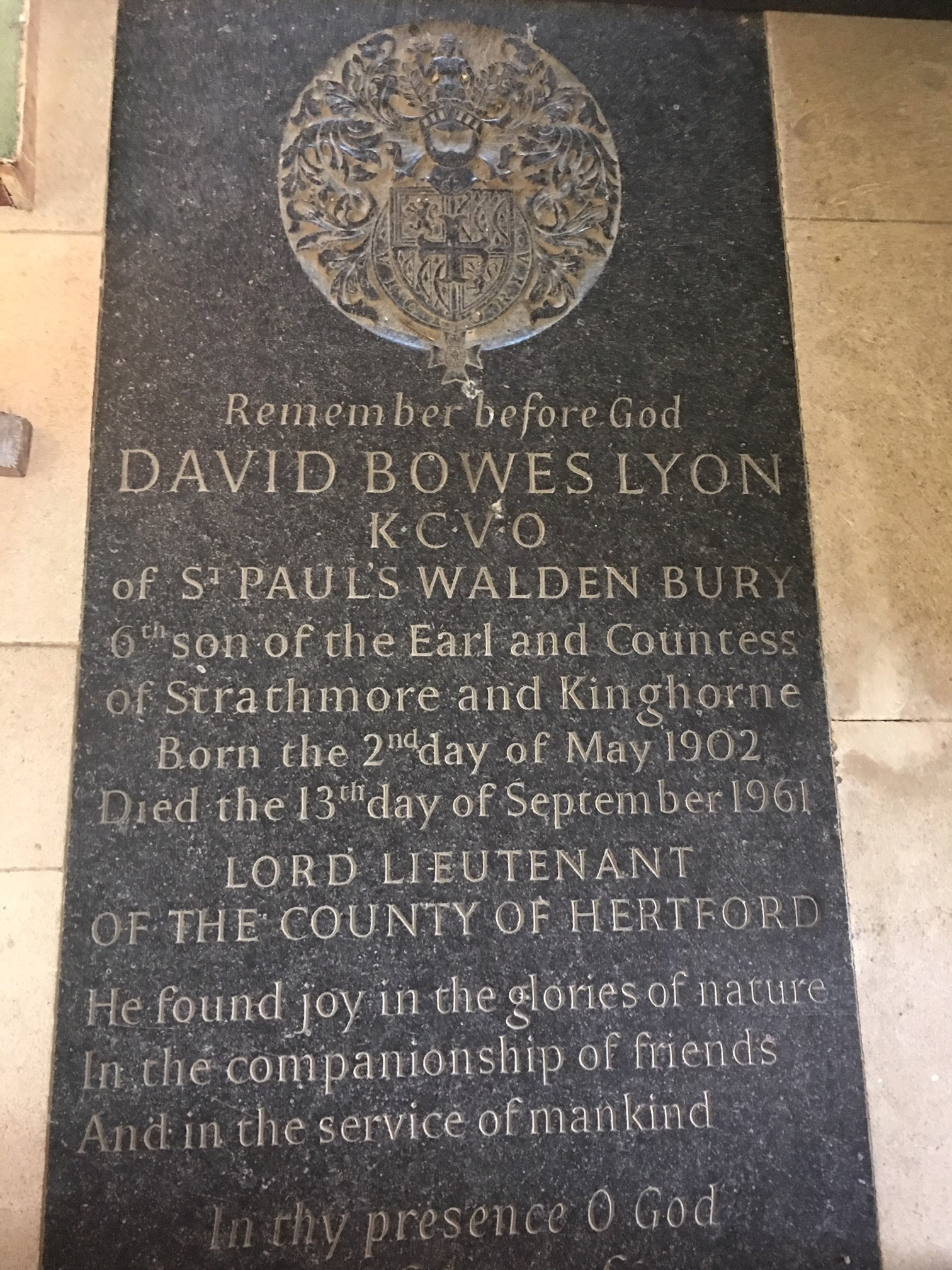
David Bowes-Lyon memorial in All Saints, Saint Paul's Walden, Hertfordshire

During World War II, Bowes-Lyon was a member of the secret propaganda department Political Warfare Executive. He was High Sheriff of Hertfordshire in 1950 and Lord Lieutenant of Hertfordshire from 1 July 1952 until his death.

On 15 December 1948, Bowes-Lyon attended the christening of his great-nephew Prince Charles. He was one of eight sponsors of the prince, along with King George VI, King Haakon VII of Norway, Queen Mary, Princess Margaret, the Dowager Marchioness of Milford Haven, Patricia, Lady Brabourne, and Prince George of Greece and Denmark.

As a keen gardener, Bowes-Lyon was awarded the Victoria Medal of Honour in 1953 and served as president of the Royal Horticultural Society from 1953 to 1961. In 1960, he commanded the third World Orchid Conference.

Bowes-Lyon was made a Knight Commander of the Royal Victorian Order in the 1959 Birthday Honours.

== Personal life ==
On 6 February 1929, David Bowes-Lyon married Rachel Pauline Spender-Clay (1907–1996), younger daughter of Herbert Henry Spender-Clay and Pauline Spender-Clay. Together, they had two children:

- Davina Katherine Bowes-Lyon (1930–2017), who married John Aymer Dalrymple, Viscount Dalrymple, later 13th Earl of Stair (1906–1996), in 1960.
- Sir Simon Alexander Bowes-Lyon (b. 1932), who married Caroline Mary Viktoria Pike (b. 1940) in 1966.

Bowes-Lyon died at his sister Elizabeth's home, Birkhall, on the Balmoral estate, of a heart attack after suffering from hemiplegia on 13 September 1961, aged 59. The Queen Mother discovered him dead in bed. The funeral was held at Ballater, and he was buried at St Paul's Walden Bury. His widow died thirty-four years later on 21 January 1996, aged 89.

Honorary titles
Preceded by Walter Hugh Crosland	High Sheriff of Hertfordshire; 1950	Succeeded by Sir William Acland, Bt
Preceded by The Viscount Hampden	Lord Lieutenant of Hertfordshire; 1952–1961	Succeeded by Sir George Burns
