= John Peel (Leicester MP) =

British politician (1912–2004)

Dato Sir John Peel DSNB DSLJ
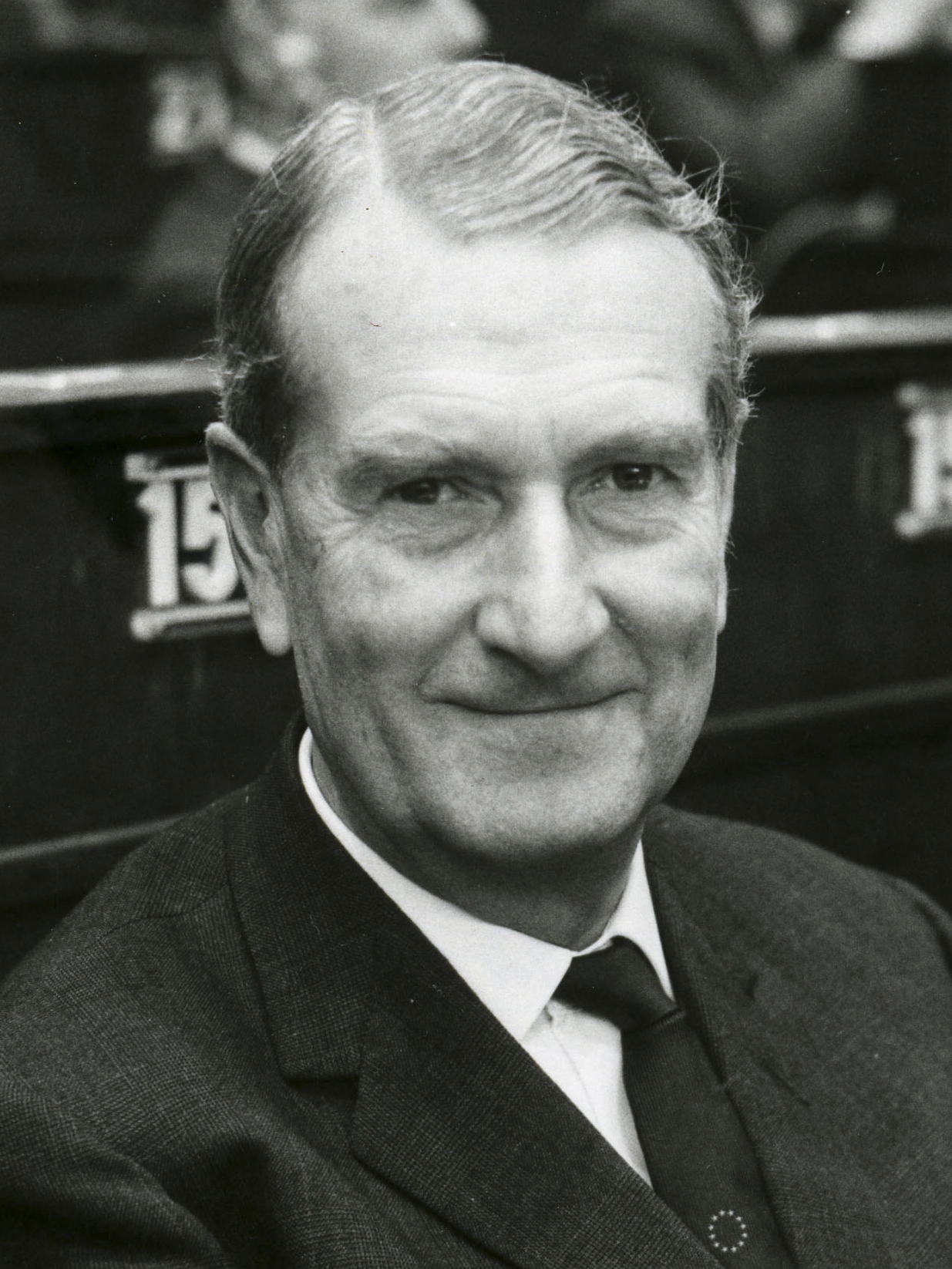
- Peel in 1973

Member of Parliament for Leicester South East
- In office 28 November 1957 – 8 February 1974
- Preceded by: Charles Waterhouse

Resident Commissioner of the Gilbert and Ellice Islands
- In office 1949–1952
- Preceded by: Henry Evans Maude
- Succeeded by: Michael Bernacchi

15th British Resident in Brunei
- In office 1946–1948
- Monarch: George VI
- Preceded by: Ernest Edgar Pengilly
- Succeeded by: Leslie Davis

Personal details
- Born: William John Peel; 16 June 1912
- Died: 8 May 2004 (aged 91)
- Party: Conservative
- Spouse: Rosemary Mia Minka Redhead (m. 1936)
- Parent: William Peel (father)
- Education: Wellington College, Berkshire
- Alma mater: Queens' College, Cambridge
- Awards: Knight Bachelor (1973)

Sir William John Peel DSNB DLJ (16 June 1912 – 8 May 2004) was a British Conservative politician who served as member of parliament for Leicester South East from 1957 to 1974. He also became an honorary member of the Brunei aristocracy, near the conclusion of his life.

== Early life ==
Peel attended Wellington College and Queens' College, Cambridge. His first career was in the Colonial Service from 1933 to 1951; he survived imprisonment by the Japanese during the Second World War from 1942 to 1945, when he was stationed in Singapore, to later serve terms from 1949 to 1951, as British Resident in Brunei and then Resident Commissioner in the Gilbert and Ellice Islands colony (now Kiribati and Tuvalu) before retiring in 1952.

== Diplomatic career ==
Peel was the British Resident in Brunei from 1946 to 1948, upon the establishment of civilian authority following Second World War. Peel, who was always helpful to Brunei history students, was also a part of a British Parliamentary delegation visiting the Sultanate in 1959. While in Brunei, he made friends with Sultan Omar Ali Saifuddin III (the father of Sultan Hassanal Bolkiah) who later invited old acquaintances to his own suite at the Dorchester; in 1969, he named Peel an honorary member of the Brunei aristocracy. Brunei was politically unstable during the residential era, with British administration in both internal and external affairs. In an August 1995 interview with Peel, he stated:

Brunei was a protected state and the treaty provided that he (the Sultan) should accept a British Resident and his advice on all subjects other than the Mohammedan religion and Malay customs. So the Sultan had to accept my advice on all other subjects and that was just how it was before the war. So I had very wide powers indeed. I was really responsible for the general affairs of the state. In the State Council which was presided over by the Sultan, I was sitting next to him to advise him, because actually I did the paper work of the meeting. Absolutely, I ran the government.

— Sir William John Peel, Borneo Bulletin, August 1995

== Political career ==
Peel was elected as a member of the House of Commons at a by-election in 1957. In July 1959, he provoked angry responses from the House when he reacted to the Mau Mau rebellion in Kenya by stating: "There are obvious risks in dealing with desperate and sub-human individuals." In the resulting debate, Peel's remarks were denounced by Enoch Powell, who commented: "We cannot, we dare not, in Africa of all places, fall below our highest standards in the acceptance of responsibility". Though Peel's tenure of minor government positions was uninterrupted, he never reached the Cabinet.

Peel was a zealous advocate of British involvement in Europe, through the Council of Europe, the Western European Union, and eventually membership—of which he was a leading advocate—in the European Communities. In 1972, he was chosen President of the North Atlantic Assembly. In the following year he was knighted, and also became one of the first British members of the European Parliament.

== Death ==
Peel died on 8 May 2004, at the age of 91, in his London home. He was survived by his widow, three daughters (Joanna, Alethea, and Lynda), one son (Quentin), and numerous grandchildren and great-grandchildren. The family funeral was scheduled for 18 May 2004, at Putney Crematorium. He died a wealthy man who left an estate worth £681,057 net. He was the last-surviving former British Resident of Brunei at the time of his death, though not the longest-lived; that honour went to his immediate successor, Leslie Harold Newsom Davis, who died on 16 June 2003 at the age of 94.

== Personal life ==
Peel married Rosemary Mia Minka Redhead in 1936. His father Sir William Peel had been Governor of Hong Kong.

== Honours ==
In addition to being knighted in 1973, he had two Brunei datoships, the DSNB in 1971 and the DSLJ in 1969.

- Order of Setia Negara Brunei Second Class (DSNB; 27 November 1971) – Dato Setia
- Order of Paduka Seri Laila Jasa Second Class (DSLJ; 1969) – Dato Seri Laila Jasa

Parliament of the United Kingdom
Preceded by Charles Waterhouse	Member of Parliament for Leicester South East; 1957 – Feb 1974	Constituency abolished
Diplomatic posts
Preceded by Ernest Edgar Pengilly	British Resident to Brunei; 1946–1948	Succeeded by Leslie Davis
