= James Grimston, 1st Earl of Verulam =

British peer and politician (1775–1845)

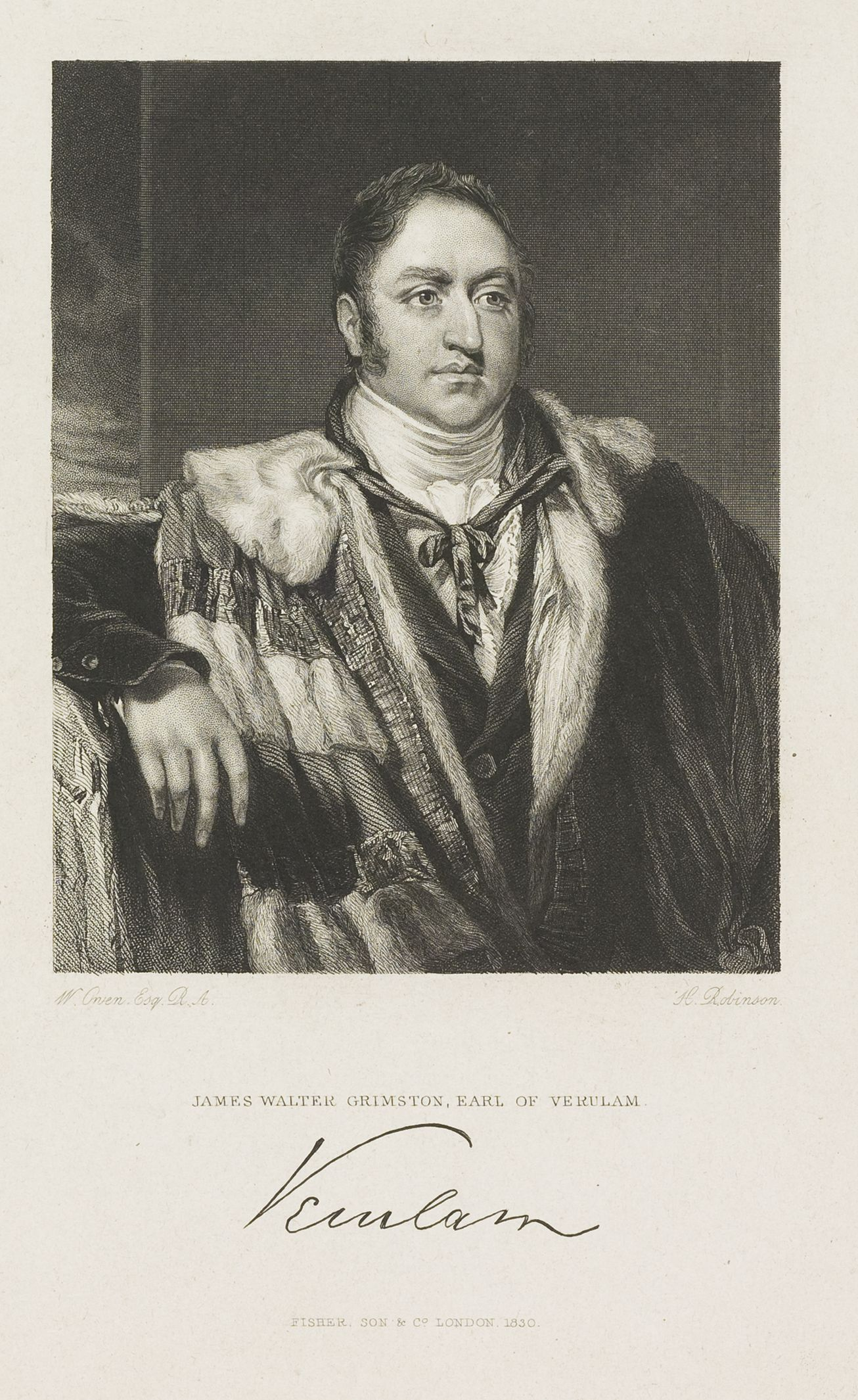
James Walter Grimston, 1st Earl of Verulam

James Walter Grimston, 1st Earl of Verulam (26 September 1775 – 17 November 1845), styled Lord Dunboyne from 1775 until 1808 and known as the 4th Viscount Grimston from 1808 to 1815, was a British peer and politician.

== Life and career ==
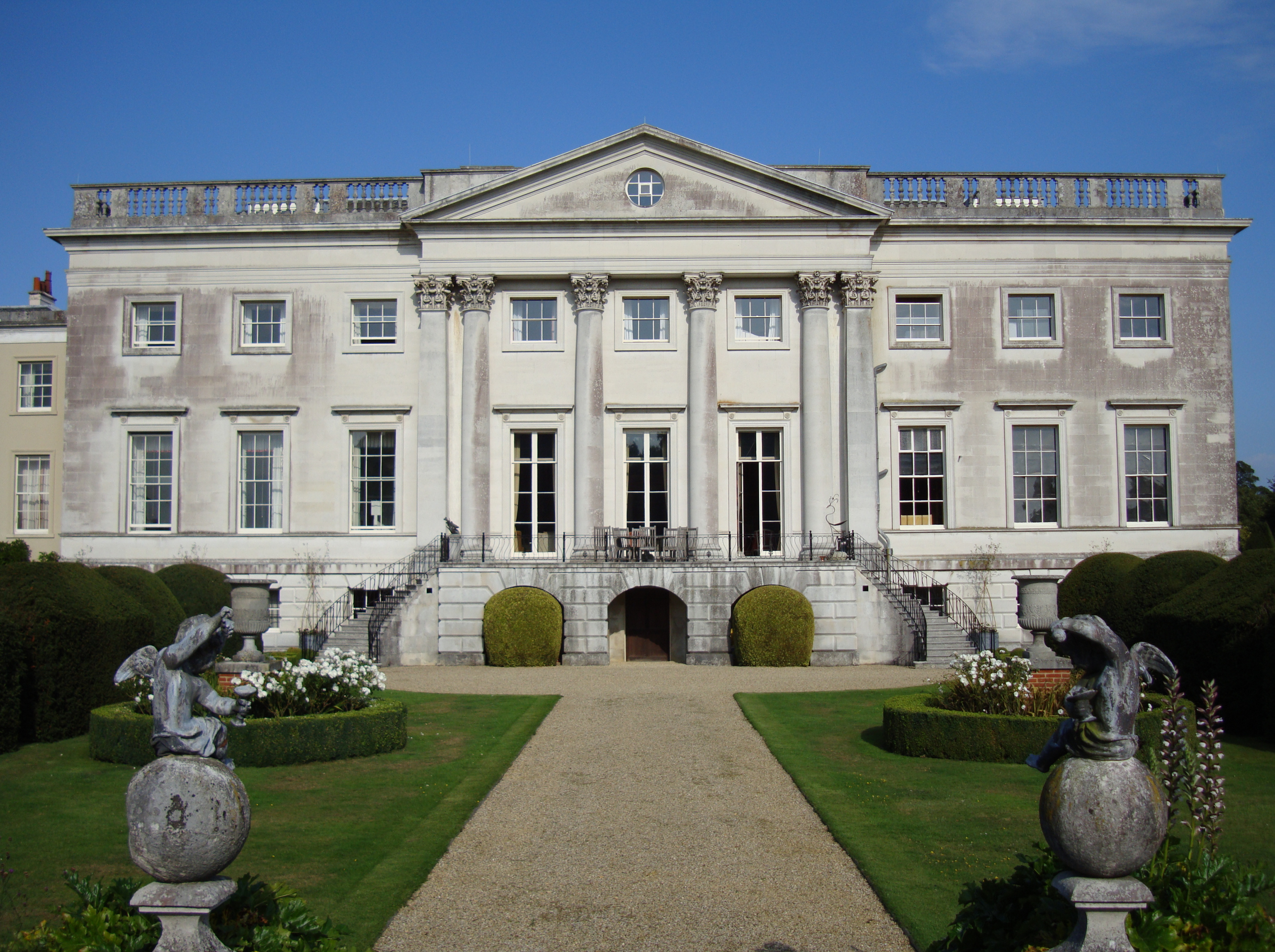
Gorhambury House, built by his father in 1777–84

He was the son of James Grimston, 3rd Viscount Grimston of Gorhambury House and Harriot Walter.

In 1802 he was elected to the House of Commons for St Albans, a seat he held until 1808, when he succeeded his father as fourth Viscount Grimston and second Baron Verulam and entered the House of Lords. The latter year, he also succeeded his maternal cousin as tenth Lord Forrester.

In 1815 he was created Viscount Grimston and Earl of Verulam in the Peerage of the United Kingdom. He later held the honorary post of Lord Lieutenant of Hertfordshire from 1823 to 1845.

== Marriage and issue ==
In 1807, he married Lady Charlotte Jenkinson, daughter of Charles Jenkinson, 1st Earl of Liverpool and Catherine Bishopp. They had six sons and four daughters, and all of their daughters married earls:

- James Walter Grimston, 2nd Earl of Verulam (Feb. 22, 1809 –1895)
- Lady Katherine Grimston (April 18, 1810 – 1874), married in 1834 John Foster-Barham (d. 1838), married in 1839 George Villiers, 4th Earl of Clarendon
- Edward Harbottle Grimston (Aug. 2, 1812–1881)
- Henry Luckyn Grimston (August 1813 - 1814, young)
- Lady Emily Mary Grimston (Feb. 14, 1816–1901), married William Craven, 2nd Earl of Craven
- Robert Grimston (Sept. 18, 1816–1884)
- Capt. Charles Grimston (Oct. 3, 1818–1857), Coldstream Guards
- Lady Mary Augusta Frederica Grimston (July 29, 1821 – 1879), married Jacob Pleydell-Bouverie, 4th Earl of Radnor
- Rev. Francis Sylvester Grimston (Dec. 8, 1823–1865), married Katherine Morier and had issue
- Lady Jane Frederica Harriet Mary Grimston (Jan. 17, 1825–1888), married James Alexander, 3rd Earl of Caledon

Lord Verulam died in November 1845, aged 70, and was succeeded in his titles by his eldest son James. Lady Verulam died in 1863.

== Notes ==
Parliament of the United Kingdom
Preceded by Thomas Skip Dyot Bucknall; William Stephen Poyntz	Member of Parliament for St Albans; 1802–1808; With: William Stephen Poyntz 1802–1807; Joseph Thompson Halsey 1807–1808	Succeeded by Joseph Thompson Halsey; Daniel Giles
Honorary titles
Preceded by The Marquess of Salisbury	Lord Lieutenant of Hertfordshire; 1823–1845	Succeeded by The Earl of Verulam
Peerage of the United Kingdom
New title	Earl of Verulam; 1815–1845	Succeeded by James Walter Grimston
Peerage of Great Britain
Preceded by James Bucknall Grimston	Baron Verulam; 1808–1845	Succeeded by James Walter Grimston
Peerage of Ireland
Preceded by James Bucknall Grimston	Viscount Grimston; 1808–1845	Succeeded by James Walter Grimston
Peerage of Scotland
Preceded by Anna Maria Cockburn of Ormistoun	Lord Forrester; 1808–1845	Succeeded by James Walter Grimston
