= Charles Waterhouse (politician) =

British Conservative Party politician

The Right Honourable Charles Waterhouse MC DL JP

Member of Parliament for Leicester South
- In office 1924–1945
- Preceded by: Ronald Wilberforce Allen
- Succeeded by: Herbert Bowden

Member of Parliament for Leicester South East
- In office 1950–1957
- Preceded by: Constituency established
- Succeeded by: John Peel

Comptroller of the Household
- In office 1937–1939
- Preceded by: George Davies
- Succeeded by: Charles Kerr

Treasurer of the Household
- In office April 1939 – ? 1939
- Preceded by: Arthur Hope
- Succeeded by: Robert Grimston

Personal details
- Born: 1 July 1893 Salford, Greater Manchester
- Died: 1 March 1975 (aged 81) Sheffield, South Yorkshire
- Party: Conservative
- Spouse: Beryl Chrystol Ford (m. 1917)
- Children: 3 (2 sons, 1 daughter)

Charles Waterhouse MC DL JP (1 July 1893 – 1 March 1975) was a British Conservative Party politician.

== Biography ==
Born in Salford, the second surviving son of Thomas Crompton Waterhouse, of Lomberdale Hall, Bakewell, Derbyshire, he was educated at Cheltenham and at Trinity Hall, Cambridge, graduating with an MA degree in Economics in 1914.

Waterhouse served in World War I in France with the 1st Life Guards. In 1917 he married Beryl Chrystol Ford, and the couple had two sons and one daughter.

He was unsuccessful parliamentary candidate in Derbyshire North-East at the 1922 General Election and 1923 General Election. He was elected as Member of Parliament (MP) for Leicester South at the 1924 General Election, holding the seat until his defeat in 1945 General Election. He was re-elected for Leicester South-East in 1950, holding that seat until 1957.

Waterhouse held office as Parliamentary Private Secretary to the President of the Board of Trade in 1928; and to the Minister of Labour from 1931 to 1934. He progressed through the Whip's office, holding posts as an Assistant Whip in 1935–1936, a Junior Lord of the Treasury in 1936, Comptroller of the Household in 1937–1939 and Treasurer of the Household in 1939. He then held office as Assistant Postmaster-General from 1939 to 1941, Parliamentary Secretary to the Board of Trade from 1941 to 1945. He chaired Tanganyika Concessions from 1957 to 1966.

He was appointed a Privy Counsellor in 1944. He was a Deputy Lieutenant and Justice of the Peace for Derbyshire. He died in Sheffield aged 82.

Parliament of the United Kingdom
Preceded by Ronald Wilberforce Allen	Member of Parliament for Leicester South; 1924–1945	Succeeded by Herbert Bowden
New constituency	Member of Parliament for Leicester South East; 1950–1957	Succeeded by John Peel
Political offices
Preceded by George Davies	Comptroller of the Household; 1937–1939	Succeeded by Charles Kerr
Preceded by Arthur Hope	Treasurer of the Household; 1939	Succeeded by Robert Grimston
