= Lord Forrester =

Title in the Peerage of Scotland

The title Lord Forrester was created in the Peerage of Scotland in 1633 for Sir George Forrester, Bt who had already been created a baronet in the Baronetage of Nova Scotia in 1625. When his only son died, Forrester was given a regrant of the peerage in 1651 with special remainders:

- firstly to George's third daughter's husband, James Baillie and their issue in tail male.
- secondly to James' younger brother, William, and also the husband of George's fourth daughter, Lilias and their issue in tail male.
- thirdly to the issue of the brothers by their wives in tail general (including females) according to primogeniture.
- and fourthly to James' heirs male or of entail to be made by him.

Upon George's death three years later, his son-in-law, James (who had changed his surname to Forrester) inherited the title. James' only child by George's daughter had died in 1652 and though he had further issue by his second wife, Lady Jean Ruthven (daughter of the 1st Earl of Brentford), upon his own murder by Mrs Hamilton in 1679, the title passed to his younger brother, William as stipulated by the second remainder. William's son (who also changed his surname to Forrester) inherited the title in 1681 and it continued in the male line until the death of the seventh Lord in 1763, when it passed to the sixth Lord's sister, Caroline. Her only daughter, Anna inherited the title in 1784 and it then passed to Anna's first cousin-once-removed, Viscount Grimston (later Earl of Verulam) in 1808, with which family the title continues to be held by to this day.

The earliest known individual of that name in the neighbourhood of West Edinburgh was a William Forrester, Esquire, who appears on the muster roll of the Peel of Linlithgow in 1311.

Alexander Forrester, John Forrester's great-grandson, was confirmed by James V in the lands and Barony of Corstorphine, including Clerkington, Nether Liberton, Drilaw and Meadowfield. In 1539 he resigned Corstorphine in favour of James Forrester of Meadowfield, the husband of Alexander's granddaughter Agnes. This James ultimately succeeded Alexander and became James Forrester of Corstorphine.

At Holyrood House on 30 July 1618 James VI & I confirmed Sir George Forrester of Corstorphine in the lands and barony of Corstorphine. George had already had some land disjoined from the barony of Corstorphine, which he had sold. On 22 July 1633 he was created Lord Forrester of Corstorphine by Charles I. Having no son to succeed him, Lord Forrester resigned most of his properties, including Corstorphine, in favour of James Baillie. Baillie was the eldest son of Major General William Baillie of Lethame, who had married George's fourth daughter Johanna around 1649.

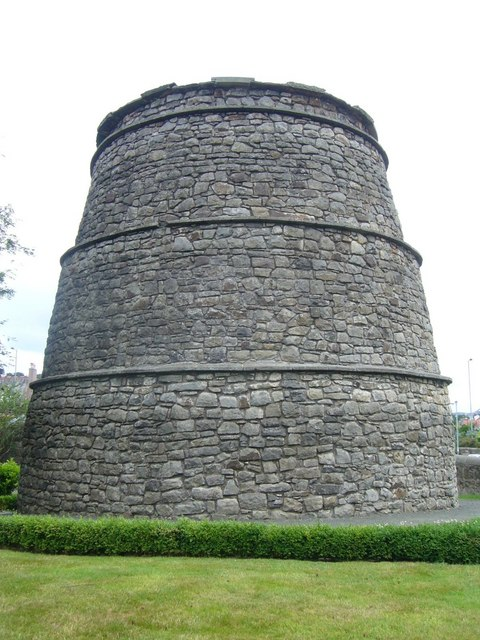
Corstorphine doocot—all that remains of Corstorphine Castle, built in the 14th century by the Forrester family. The doocot dates from the 16th century.

During the mid-seventeenth century the family seems to have experienced some financial problems, which resulted in lands being temporarily out of their control. On 3 August 1663 the lands and Barony of Corstorphine, except for the castle of Corstorphine and the town of Corstorphine, was granted to Sir John Gilmour. Oliver Cromwell had granted Laurence Scott of Bavelaw and his wife Katherine Binning, the lands, Lordship and Barony of Corstorphine, tower, manor-place, mills, mill-lands, parsonage etc., in lieu of the money due by James, Lord Forrester, to Beatrix Ramsay in Corstorphine who had assigned the debt to the said Laurence Scott, 1654. On 5 August 1664 the lands, Lordship and Barony of Corstorphine formerly belonging to James, Lord Forrester, and his brother German William Baillie which had been taken in lieu of debt, were granted to Florentius Gardner, baillie of Grangepans. (Similarly lands in Stirlingshire owned by Lord Forrester were taken to pay his debts to Richard Murray and Margaret Gairdner, in 1655.)

James Forrester of Corstorphine (son of the previously mentioned James Forrester), husband of Janet Lauder, was confirmed by Mary, Queen of Scots, on 5 February 1556 in the Barony of Corstorphine. In 1577 Sir James presented the parish kirk with a bell for its steeple. This bell still survives, although it was renewed in 1728. James died on 4 June 1589 and his brother Henry was declared to be his heir.

On the death of Sir William in 1796 the said baronies passed to his brother Sir John Dick, and in 1812 on his death they passed to his brother Sir Robert Keith Dick. In 1869 the barony of Corstorphine was sold to a John Dickson, then residing at Saughton Mains, which was confirmed on 4 May 1871. The barony remained with the Dickson family, who were for the most part Edinburgh lawyers, until 1986 when the last remaining interests in the barony, for by this time almost all of the land had been sold, was given to The Corstorphine Trust. Title passed from The Corstorphine Trust to the present and 34th Baron of Corstorphine, Michael John Milne in November 2005. The title was recorded in the Scottish Barony Register on 21 December 2005.

James Baillie's first wife Johanna died early. He then married Janet Ruthven, daughter of the Earl of Forth. Baillie was a man of dubious morals and seduced his niece Christian Nimmo, the wife of an Edinburgh burgess. She, however, later quarrelled with Forrester and stabbed him to death in his garden at Corstorphine on 26 August 1679. Mrs. Nimmo was later executed at the Cross of Edinburgh for the murder. Her story was the inspiration for Kate Foster's 2023 novel The Maiden, which tells the story from Christian's perspective. The tree under which James was murdered was said to be the largest sycamore tree in Scotland, and his ghost was said to haunt the tree.

The titles then fell to William, the son of his brother William Baillie and his wife Lillias, daughter of the first Lord Forrester. William, as 4th Lord Forrester, married Margaret, daughter of Sir Andrew Birnie, a Judge of the Court of Session. They had several children including George who succeeded to the title on the death of his father in 1705. During this period, in 1698, the estate of Corstorphine was sold to Hugh Wallace of Ingliston, a Writer to the Signet. He later, in 1713, sold it to Sir James Dick of Prestonfield, in whose family it remained until 1869. (The Dicks were a prominent family of lawyers and merchants in Edinburgh. Sir James Dick (1643–1728) was a merchant and baillie of Edinburgh and also served as Dean of Guild and later Lord Provost.)

== Forrester baronets of Corstorphine (1625) ==
- Sir George Forrester, 1st Baronet (died 1654), created Lord Forrester in 1633. NRS CH2/124/1/p.43

== Lords Forrester (1633) ==
- George Forrester, 1st Lord Forrester (died 1654)
- James Baillie, 2nd Lord Forrester (1629–1679) murdered by Christian Nimmo, his wife's niece
- William Baillie, 3rd Lord Forrester (1632–1681)
- William Forrester, 4th Lord Forrester (died 1705)
- George Forrester, 5th Lord Forrester (1688–1727)
- George Forrester, 6th Lord Forrester (1724–1748)
- William Forrester, 7th Lord Forrester (1736–1763)
- Caroline Cockburn of Ormistoun, 8th Lady Forrester (died 1784)
- Anna Maria Cockburn of Ormistoun, 9th Lady Forrester (died 1808)
- James Walter Grimston, 1st Earl of Verulam, 10th Lord Forrester (1775–1845)
- see Earl of Verulam for further holders.
