= Robert Voss =

British businessman

Robert Voss CBE CStJ
- Born: February 9, 1953 (age 73)

Robert Voss CBE CStJ Hon LLD is a British businessman and public figure who has served as Lord-Lieutenant of Hertfordshire since August 2017. Before his appointment, he had a career in the international metals trade and held leadership positions in industry organisations. During his tenure as Lord-Lieutenant, he has been involved in initiatives concerning entrepreneurship, community engagement, charitable organisations, faith communities and the Armed Forces.

== Early life and education ==
Voss's parents came to the United Kingdom as refugees from Nazi Germany shortly before the Second World War. He has spoken publicly about the impact of the Holocaust on his family, stating that 91 members of his family were killed during the genocide.

He graduated in Management Science from the University of Manchester and Manchester Business School in 1975.

== Business career ==
Voss worked in the metals industry for more than four decades. He began his career as a graduate trainee at Brookside Metal and subsequently became a director of Metramet. In 1987, he founded Voss International, a company trading in non-ferrous metals. The business developed an international trading network, operating in more than 65 countries.

At the age of 31, he became president of the British Secondary Metals Association. He later held senior positions in international metals trade organisations, including serving as president of the European Metal Trade and Recycling Federation (Eurometrec). He also chaired the International Trade Council of the Bureau of International Recycling (BIR) for seven years and served on the board of its Non-Ferrous Metals Division for more than 25 years.

Voss retired from the metals trade in 2015. Voss International was subsequently placed into administration.

== Entrepreneurship and voluntary work ==
Voss has been involved in initiatives supporting young people interested in business and enterprise. He has worked as a judge and mentor for Young Enterprise and established a Young Entrepreneurs Challenge. He has also invested in young businesses and served as a judge for the National Business Awards.

In 2019, he established the Lord-Lieutenant of Hertfordshire's Entrepreneurs Challenge in partnership with the Hertfordshire County Show. The competition provides emerging businesses with an opportunity to exhibit their products or services, present their ideas to a judging panel and compete for financial awards and business support, including professional advice and access to the University of Hertfordshire's business incubator facilities.

Voss has also supported charitable and voluntary organisations in Hertfordshire. In December 2023, he opened a charity hub at Warner Bros. Studios Leavesden. The facility provides shared workspace for local charities, with the aim of enabling them to work together, exchange ideas and develop their activities. The project was conceived by Voss after meeting smaller charities that faced difficulties working in isolation.

During the COVID-19 pandemic, Voss and the High Sheriff of Hertfordshire supported the Hero of Hertfordshire awards, recognising individuals, organisations and charities for their contributions to local communities during the crisis. The initiative recognised around 200 people and groups.

== Holocaust remembrance and Jewish community ==
Voss has been involved in Holocaust remembrance and education. In 2015, he was a member of the survivors' testimony committee of the UK Holocaust Memorial Foundation, which was established to support the development of a national Holocaust memorial and learning centre.

He has spoken about his family's experience of the Holocaust and has taken part in events commemorating its victims. In January 2019, he attended a burial service for the remains of unidentified Holocaust victims, where he spoke about the loss suffered by his family.

Voss is a member of Northwood and Pinner Liberal Synagogue. In January 2021, he became an honorary patron of the Association of Jewish Ex-Servicemen and Women (AJEX). His father and father-in-law both served in the British Army during the Second World War.

== Lord-Lieutenant of Hertfordshire ==
On 4 August 2017, Voss was appointed Lord-Lieutenant of Hertfordshire by Queen Elizabeth II, succeeding the Countess of Verulam. The Lord-Lieutenant is the monarch's personal representative in the county and undertakes ceremonial, civic and community duties.

During his tenure, Voss has sought to broaden the Lieutenancy's engagement with organisations and communities across Hertfordshire. The Lieutenancy operates a network of specialist panels involving Deputy Lieutenants. These include panels concerned with community engagement, health, education and young people, interfaith relations, business, media, social responsibility, the Commonwealth, the environment and nature, military matters and honours. Area panels also cover different parts of the county.

The panels provide a structure for the Lieutenancy to engage with organisations and communities and draw on the professional and voluntary experience of Deputy Lieutenants. In an interview in 2021, Voss described establishing a series of panels to support the work of the Lieutenancy across the county.

The Lieutenancy has also been involved in initiatives intended to support local communities and voluntary organisations. These include events recognising charitable work and the King's Award for Voluntary Service. Its community engagement has included events bringing together local charities and organisations to present their work to the public.

Voss's work with faith communities has included the Lieutenancy's interfaith panel, which brings together Deputy Lieutenants from different religious backgrounds. The Lieutenancy has also hosted events involving representatives of different faith traditions, including a gathering at Bhaktivedanta Manor in 2023.

His responsibilities have included supporting the Armed Forces and cadet organisations, recognising voluntary and public service, presenting honours and awards, and undertaking civic and ceremonial duties on behalf of the monarch. The Lord-Lieutenant also has responsibilities relating to royal visits, the honours system and liaison with local military and cadet units.

Voss served as president of the East Anglia Reserve Forces and Cadets Association from 2022 to 2025.

== Honours and recognition ==
Voss was appointed a Commander of the Order of the British Empire (CBE) in the 2014 New Year Honours for services to British industry and voluntary work in the United Kingdom.

In February 2020, he was sanctioned as a Commander of the Order of St John (CStJ).

In 2023, the University of Hertfordshire awarded him an honorary Doctor of Laws degree.
