= Grimstone (surname) =

Grimstone is a surname. Notable people with the surname include:

- Ernest Grimstone (1883–1933), Australian politician
- Gerry Grimstone (born 1949), British businessman
- Mary Grimstone (1796–1869), British poet and writer
