= John Grimston, 7th Earl of Verulam =

British peer

The Right Honourable The Earl of Verulam
- Earl of Verulam
- Tenure: 15 April 1973 – present
- Predecessor: John Grimston, 6th Earl of Verulam
- Born: John Duncan Grimston; 21 April 1951 (age 75)
- Spouse: Dione Smith
- Issue: James Grimston, Viscount Grimston; The Hon. HugoGrimston; Lady Flora Grimston; The Hon. Sam Grimston
- Parents: John Grimston, 6th Earl of Verulam; Marjorie Ray Duncan

John Duncan Grimston, 7th Earl of Verulam (born 21 April 1951), styled Viscount Grimston between 1960 and 1973, is a British peer and was a member of the House of Lords from 1974 to 1999.

== Early life ==
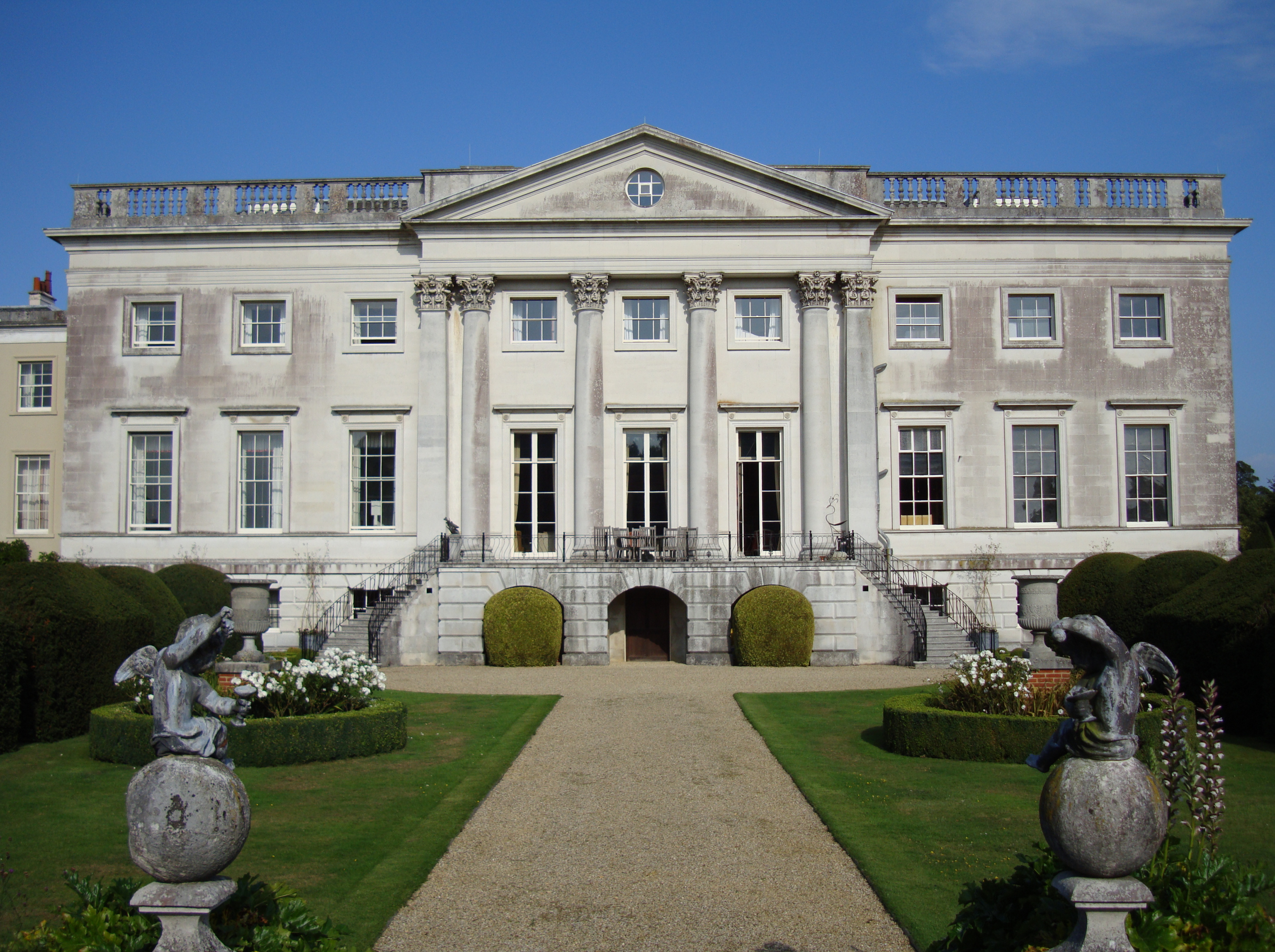
Gorhambury House, the family seat

Grimston was born in 1951, the only son of John Grimston, 6th Earl of Verulam and his wife Marjorie Ray Duncan, daughter of Walter Atholl Duncan. He was educated at West Downs, Eton and Christ Church, Oxford (MA Engineering and Economics.

In 1973, on the death of his father, he succeeded in the peerages of Earl of Verulam and Viscount Grimston (1815), Baron Forrester in the peerage of Scotland (1633), Baron Dunboyne and Viscount Grimston in the peerage of Ireland (1719), Baron Verulam (1790), and as a Baronet (1629).

An only son, he had four sisters, Lady Elizabeth (1939–1987), Lady Hermione Frances (1941), Lady Romayne Bryony (1946), and Lady Iona Charlotte (1953).

== Career ==
For fourteen years, until 1996, Verulam was a director of corporate finance at Barings Bank. He then became Managing Director of ABN-AMRO Bank from 1996 to 2000; then a Director and Vice-Chairman of Kleinwort Benson Private Bank from 2001 to 2008. He is currently Chairman of Grimston Trust Ltd and founding partner of the Verulam Consulting group.

Grimston has founded two registered charities: The Friends of St Michael's Church, and The West Herts Environmental Foundation.

== Marriage and children ==
In 1976, Verulam married Dione Smith. They have four children:

- James Walter Grimston, Viscount Grimston (born 6 January 1978), heir apparent to the earldom and other titles, married Lady Rosanagh Innes-Ker, daughter of the 10th Duke of Roxburghe, in 2008
- Hon. Hugo Guy Sylvester Grimston (born 5 November 1979), married Gallia McDermott in 2008
- Lady Flora Grimston (born 28 September 1981), married Jazz pianist Peter Letanka (grandson of John Gathorne-Hardy, 4th Earl of Cranbrook) in 2013
- Hon. Sam George Grimston (born 18 October 1983)

Verulam lives at Gorhambury House, Hertfordshire.

Peerage of the United Kingdom
Preceded by John Grimston	Earl of Verulam; 1973–present	Incumbent
