= Home-Start Worldwide =

Not-for-profit family support movement

Home-Start Worldwide is a not-for-profit family support movement, which started in the United Kingdom and has organisations in 22 countries.

== History ==
Home-Start was initiated in Leicester, UK during 1973 by Margaret Harrison, before becoming a national organisation in the UK in 1981 with nine branches. In the 1980's it became Britain’s fastest growing social franchise, continuing to grow under the Sure Start scheme of the Blair Government, and, as of 2021, reports that 27,000 families are supported yearly.

Home-Start Worldwide was founded in 1998 as a London-based umbrella-body linking Home-Start associations in 22 countries.

== Operating model ==
In 1988 children's psychiatrist John Bowlby described Home-Start as an example of a service pattern that can help prevent domestic violence, stating that it is a "home-visiting scheme ... staffed by volunteers who work in close liaison with the related statutory services and who also receive support and guidance from a professional", and that by relying on volunteers it ensures a level of equality between the volunteer and the supported mother, as well as ensuring that the volunteer has sufficient time to support the mother, including at times where employees would not be available such as on the weekend and in the evening.

A 1982 assessment of the operating model found that 85% of the families surveyed claimed considerable positive change, though the volunteers themselves were more pessimistic; they considered only half the families as having shown change, while engagement with 10% of the families was a failure. Social workers who referred the volunteers to the families were in the middle; they believed 50% of families had shown significant positive change, while the remainder had shown some positive change.

In the UK, the organisation (officially "Home-Start UK") works with around 300 different communities, and also works with UK armed forces and their families in Germany and Cyprus. Independent studies in the UK have produced mixed results.

Research on the Home-Start model in the Netherlands, however, has suggested that the program may be influential in changing parenting behaviours, particularly among high-risk groups.
