= Edward Grimston =

Edward Grimston may refer to:

- Edward Grimston (St Albans MP) (1812–1881), English amateur cricketer and politician who held a seat in the House of Commons from 1835 to 1841
- Edward Grimston (Ipswich MP) (c. 1508–1600), English politician and comptroller of Calais
- Edward Grimston (Harwich MP) (1600–1624), member of parliament for Harwich
- Edward Grimston (diplomat) (died 1478), ambassador of England at the court of Philip the Good, the Duke of Burgundy
