= Leicester South East =

Parliamentary constituency in the United Kingdom, 1950–1974

- Former borough constituency for the House of Commons

1950–February 1974
- Seats: one
- Created from: Leicester East and Leicester South
- Replaced by: Leicester East, Leicester South

Leicester South East was a borough constituency in the city of Leicester. It returned one Member of Parliament (MP) to the House of Commons of the Parliament of the United Kingdom.

The constituency was created for the 1950 general election, and abolished for the February 1974 general election.

== Boundaries ==
1950–1955: The County Borough of Leicester wards of Evington, Knighton, Spinney Hill, and Wycliffe.

1955–1974: As above plus the Urban District of Oadby.

== Members of Parliament ==
Election	Member	Party	Notes
1950	Charles Waterhouse	Conservative	Resigned 1957
1957 by-election	Sir John Peel	Conservative	
1974	constituency abolished		

== Election results ==
=== Elections in the 1950s ===
General election 1950: Leicester South East
Party	Candidate	Votes	%	±%
Conservative	Charles Waterhouse	20,964	51.37	
Labour	SK Lewis	14,823	36.32	
Liberal	Cecil Archer Newport	5,024	12.31	
Majority		6,141	15.05	
Turnout		40,811		
Conservative win (new seat)				

General election 1951: Leicester South East
Party	Candidate	Votes	%	±%
Conservative	Charles Waterhouse	23,853	59.52	
Labour Co-op	Ewart Taylor	16,225	40.48	
Majority		7,628	19.04	
Turnout		40,078	83.77	
Conservative hold		Swing		

General election 1955: Leicester South East
Party	Candidate	Votes	%	±%
Conservative	Charles Waterhouse	26,070	64.21	
Labour	Edward John Masters	14,529	35.79	
Majority		11,541	28.42	
Turnout		40,599	78.46	
Conservative hold		Swing		

1957 Leicester South East by-election
Party	Candidate	Votes	%	±%
Conservative	John Peel	18,023	60.9	−3.3
Labour	Betty Boothroyd	11,541	39.1	+3.3
Majority		6,482	21.8	−6.6
Turnout		29,564	56.3	−22.2
Conservative hold		Swing	−6.0	

General election 1959: Leicester South East
Party	Candidate	Votes	%	±%
Conservative	John Peel	28,390	67.35	
Labour	W Barrie Chambers	13,760	32.65	
Majority		14,630	34.70	
Turnout		42,150	78.33	
Conservative hold		Swing		

=== Elections in the 1960s ===
General election 1964: Leicester South East
Party	Candidate	Votes	%	±%
Conservative	John Peel	23,236	55.95	
Labour	W Barrie Chambers	11,090	26.70	
Liberal	Colin J Beech	7,205	17.35	New
Majority		12,146	29.25	
Turnout		41,531		
Conservative hold		Swing		

General election 1966: Leicester South East
Party	Candidate	Votes	%	±%
Conservative	John Peel	23,615	59.88	
Labour	Colin Grundy	15,819	40.12	
Majority		7,796	19.76	
Turnout		39,434		
Conservative hold		Swing		

=== Elections in the 1970s ===
General election 1970: Leicester South East
Party	Candidate	Votes	%	±%
Conservative	John Peel	26,483	62.65	
Labour	William Hilbourne	15,788	37.35	
Majority		10,695	25.30	
Turnout		42,271		
Conservative hold		Swing		
