= Old Gorhambury House =

Country house in St Michael, Hertfordshire, England

Coordinates: 51°45′25″N 0°23′36″W

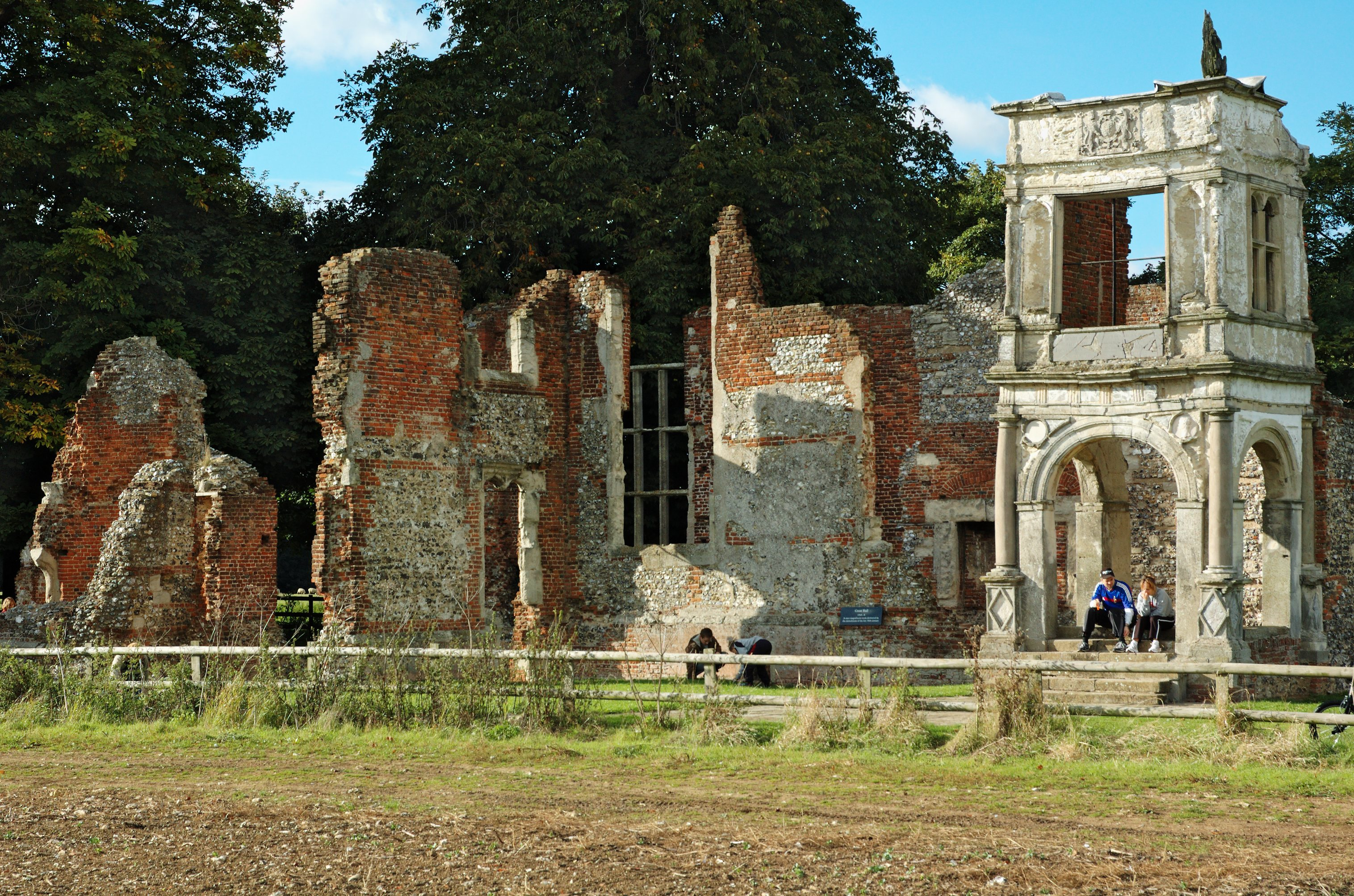
Ruins of Old Gorhambury House

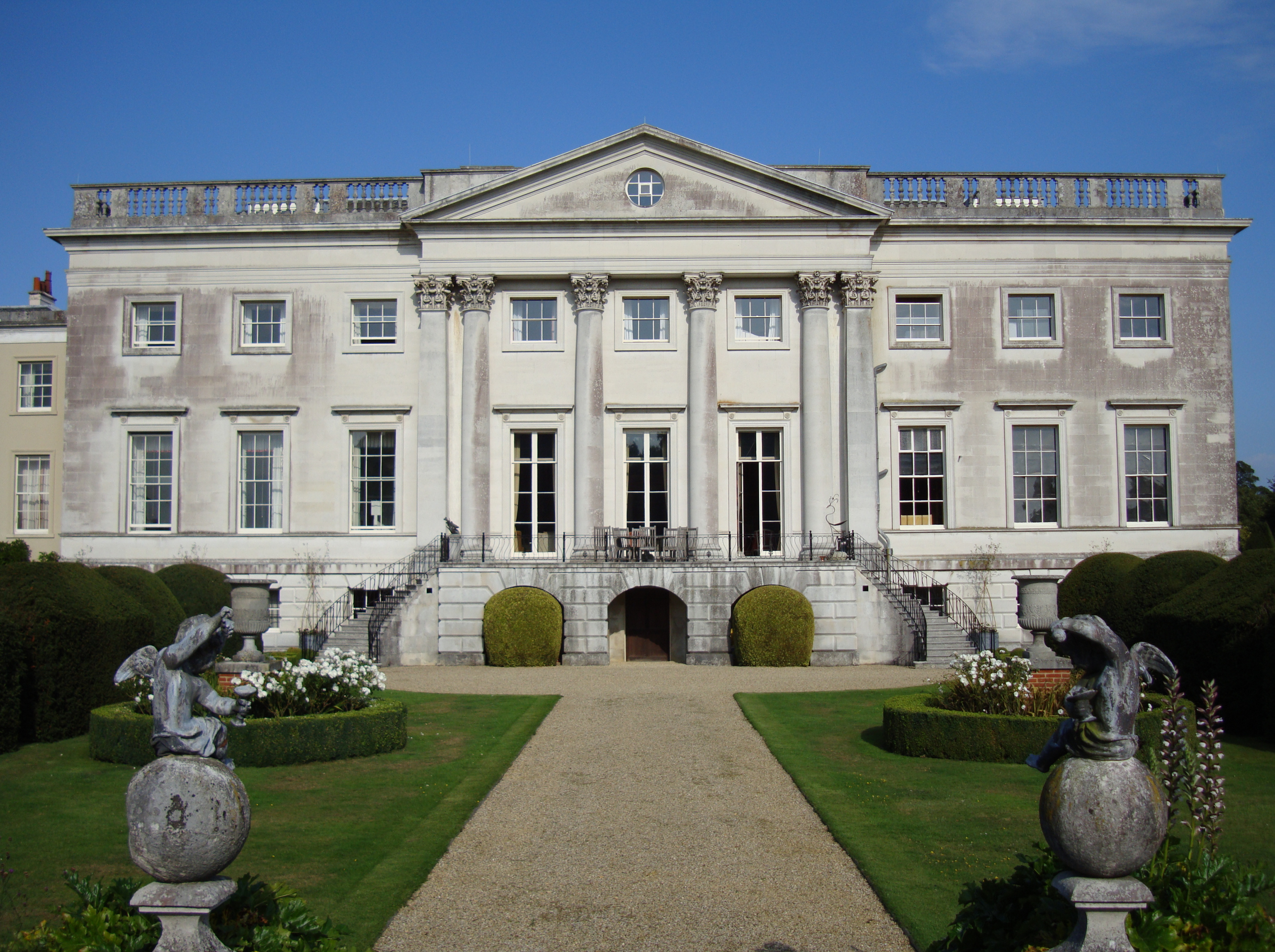
The "new" Gorhambury House, built in 1777–84

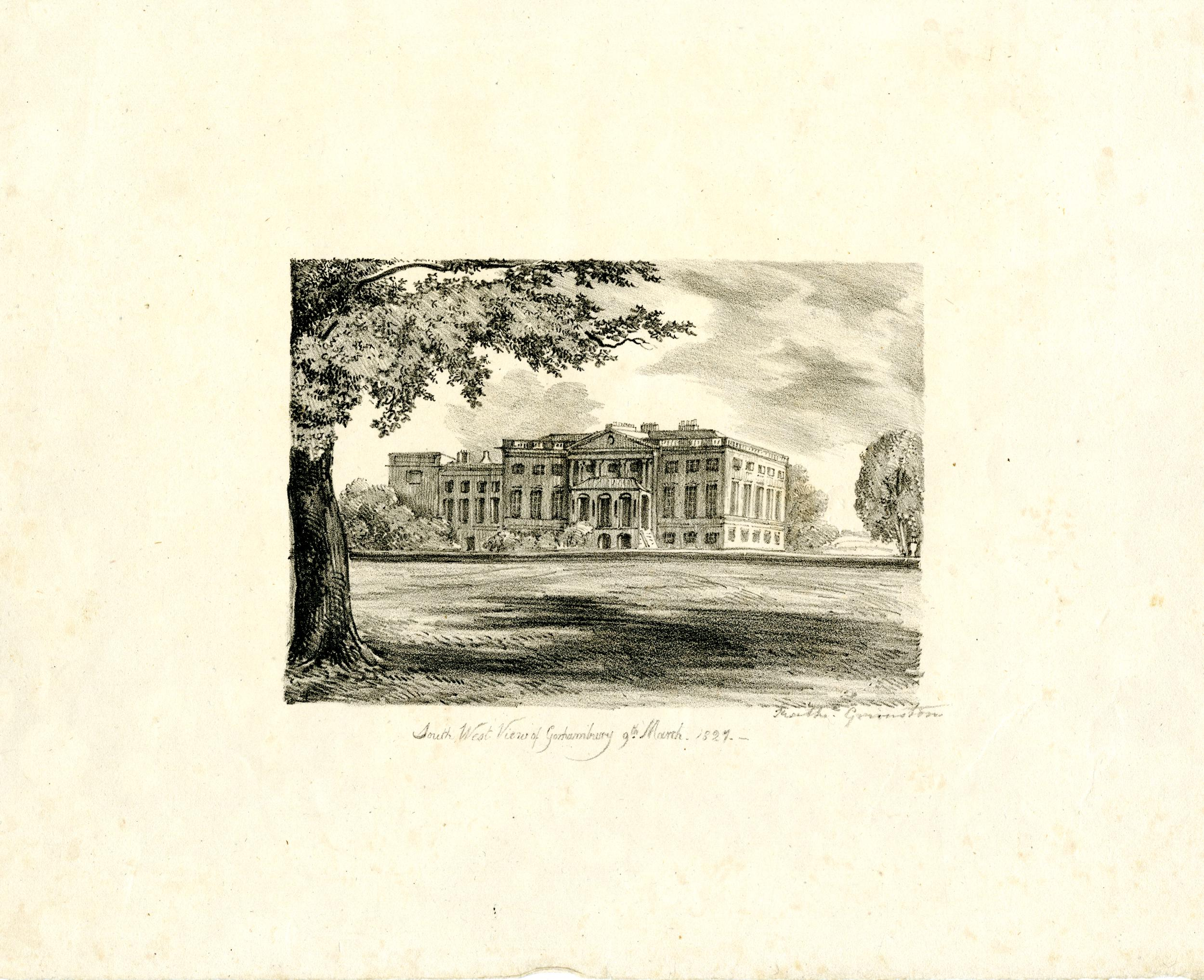
Southwest view of Gorhambury House, 9th March 1827

Old Gorhambury House located near St Albans, Hertfordshire, England, is a ruined Elizabethan mansion, a leading and early example of the Elizabethan prodigy house.

== History ==
=== The old house ===
It was built in 1563–68 by Sir Nicholas Bacon, Lord Keeper, and was visited a number of times by Queen Elizabeth I. It is a Grade I listed building.

The house was built partly from bricks taken from the old Abbey buildings at St Albans, then in process of demolition following the Benedictine priory's dissolution some 25 years earlier. It was used as a residence by his youngest son, the polymath (scientist, philosopher, statesman and essayist) Sir Francis Bacon, before being bequeathed by him to his former secretary, Sir Thomas Meautys, who married Anne Bacon, the great-granddaughter of Sir Nicholas.

The estate passed in 1652 to Anne's second husband Sir Harbottle Grimston, Master of the Rolls and Speaker in the Convention Parliament of 1660. The estate is owned by the Grimston family to the present day, having been passed via Harbottle Grimston's son Samuel, who died childless in 1700, to his great-nephew William Luckyn, who in turn became the first Viscount Grimston in 1719.

The house fell into ruin after the construction of New Gorhambury House in the 18th century, but was retained as a feature within landscaped parkland. The surviving remains include a two-storey porch, chapel and clock tower.

=== The new house ===
In the years 1777–84, the current Palladian-style Gorhambury House was built nearby. Designed by Sir Robert Taylor and commissioned by James Bucknall Grimston, 3rd Viscount Grimston, it replaced Old Gorhambury House. It remains the home of the Earl of Verulam.

The current house is a member of Historic Houses and is open for tours at certain times.

== Garden ==
The mason and sculptor William Cure the Elder, father of Cornelius Cure, made and installed a fountain at Redgrave Hall in September 1568. At this time, Bacon was making improvements at both houses, and the masons who made the steps for the fountain at Redgrave were also employed at Gorhambury. A statue of a male water-bearer in Elizabethan dress survives from the Redgrave gardens. It has been suggested that William Cure may have been responsible for contemporary features at Gorhambury. Bacon built similar long walks or avenues from the house to the pale of the park at Redgrave and Gorhambury.

The "pondyards", the remains of water garden near the River Ver, were scheduled in 2020 under the Ancient Monuments and Archaeological Areas Act 1979. The feature was laid out in the 17th century for Sir Francis Bacon, possibly adapting preexisting ponds.

== Access ==
The site is maintained by English Heritage and is free to visit.
