= Grimston baronets =

Baronetcy in the Baronetage of the United Kingdom

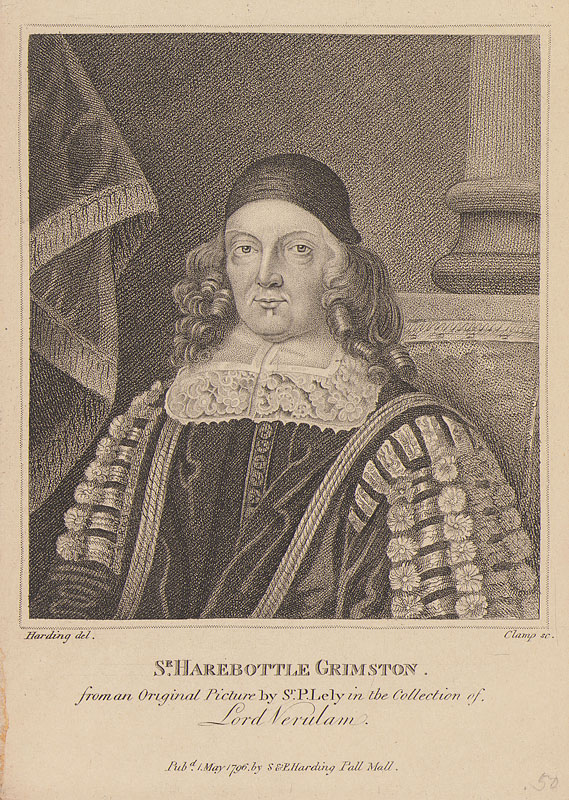
18th-century engraving of Sir Harbottle Grimston, 2nd Baronet, after a painting by Sir Peter Lely

There have been two baronetcies created for persons with the surname Grimston, once in the Baronetage of England and once in the Baronetage of the United Kingdom. One creation is extant as of 2010.

The Grimston Baronetcy, of Bradfield in the County of Essex, was created in the Baronetage of England on 25 November 1611 for Harbottle Grimston. He later represented Harwich and Essex in the House of Commons. His son, the second Baronet, served as Speaker of the House of Commons and as Master of the Rolls. His son, the third Baronet sat as Member of Parliament for St Albans. However, on his death in 1700 the title became extinct. The Grimston estates passed to his great-nephew William Luckyn, who assumed the surname of Grimston and was created Viscount Grimston in 1719. He was the ancestor of the Earls of Verulam.

The Grimston Baronetcy, of Westbury in the County of Wiltshire, was created on 11 March 1952 for Robert Grimston, a grandson of the second Earl of Verulam. He was later elevated to the peerage as Baron Grimston of Westbury. For more information, see this title.

== Grimston baronets, of Bradfield (1611) ==
Grimston baronets
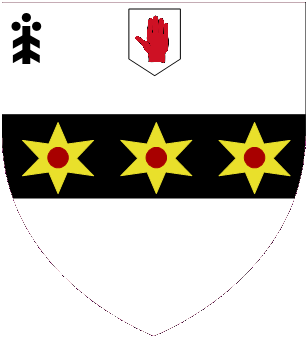
- Shield: Argent on a fess Sable three mullets of six points Or pierced Gules in the dexter chief point an Ermine spot.

- Sir Harbottle Grimston, 1st Baronet (c. 1569–1648)
- Sir Harbottle Grimston, 2nd Baronet (1603–1685)
- Sir Samuel Grimston, 3rd Baronet (1644–1700)

== Grimston baronets, of Westbury (1952) ==
- see Baron Grimston of Westbury

== See also ==
- Earl of Verulam

== Notes ==
Baronetage of England
Preceded by Holte baronets	Grimston baronets 25 November 1611	Succeeded by Blakiston baronets
