= James Grimston, 2nd Viscount Grimston =

British peer and Member of Parliament

James Grimston, 2nd Viscount Grimston (9 October 1711 – 15 December 1773) was a British peer and Member of Parliament.

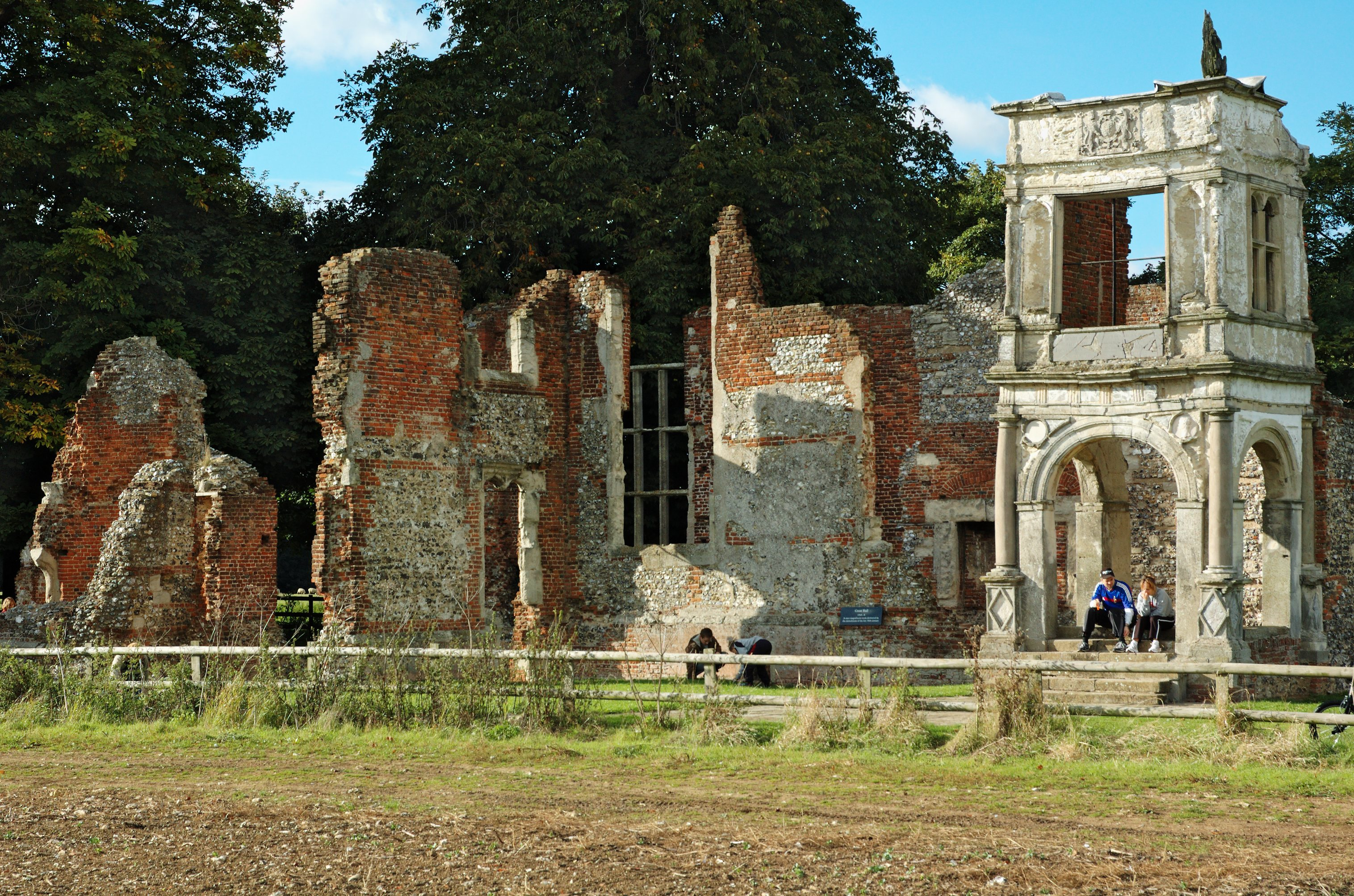
Old Gorhambury House

Grimston was the eldest surviving son of William Grimston, 1st Viscount Grimston, and Jean Cooke.

He was elected to the House of Commons for St Albans in 1754, a seat he held until 1761. He appears never to have spoken in the House. In 1756 he succeeded his father in the viscountcy but as this was an Irish peerage it did not prohibit him from sitting in the House of Commons. He also inherited Gorhambury House (now Old Gorhambury House), near St Albans, Hertfordshire.

Lord Grimston married Mary Bucknall, daughter of William Bucknall of Oxhey, Watford, in 1746, and had eight children, 3 sons and 5 daughters. He died in December 1773, aged 62, and was succeeded in his titles by his son James. Lady Grimston died in 1778. His second son was the politician William Grimston (1750-1814), who later changed his name to William Bucknall on inheriting the estate of his mother's brother James Askell Bucknall. There is a famous portrait of William's only daughter Sophia as Psyche, painted by Henry Hoppner Meyer. Lord Grimston's daughter Mary married William Hale, grandson of the eminent judge Sir Bernard Hale.

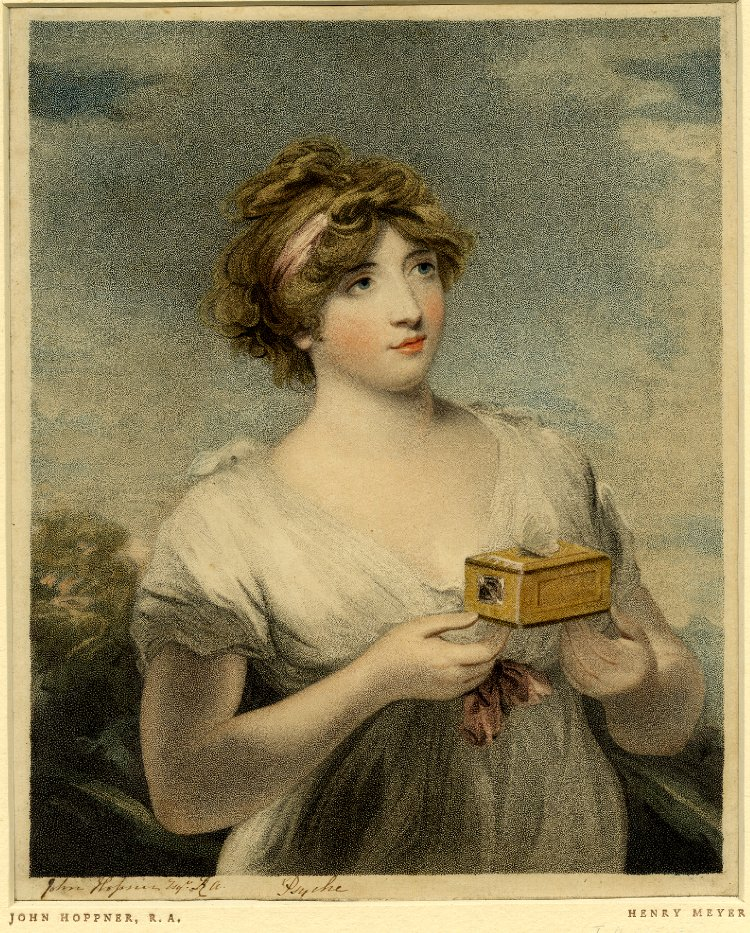
"Psyche"- portrait of Lord Grimston"s granddaughter Sophia Bucknall

== Notes ==
Parliament of Great Britain
Preceded by James West; Sir Peter Thompson	Member of Parliament for St Albans; 1754–1761; With: James West	Succeeded by James West; Viscount Nuneham
Peerage of Ireland
Preceded by William Grimston	Viscount Grimston; 1756–1773	Succeeded by James Grimston
