= Gorhambury House =

Country house in St Michael, Hertfordshire, England

Coordinates: 51.7583°N 0.3877°W

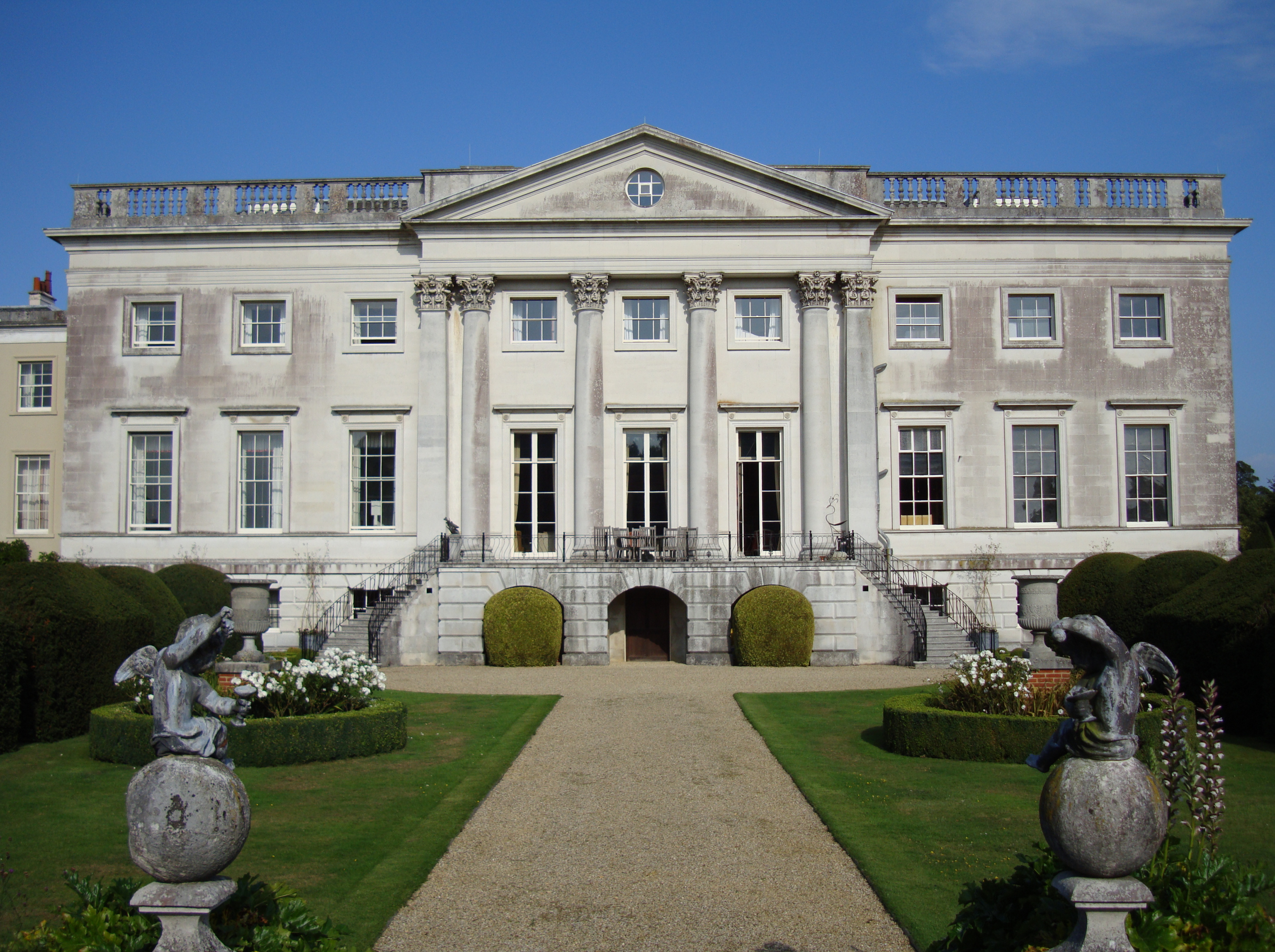
Gorhambury House with its hexastyle Corinthian portico

Gorhambury House is a Palladian-style house near St Albans, Hertfordshire, England. It was built between 1777 and 1784 to replace Old Gorhambury House, which was left to fall into ruin.

It was designed by Sir Robert Taylor and commissioned by James Grimston, 3rd Viscount Grimston. Grimston's son was made Earl of Verulam, and the building is currently the home of the 7th Earl of Verulam.

Features of interest inside include a fireplace designed by Piranesi. The house is Grade II* listed. It is a member of Historic Houses Association and is open for tours at certain times.

The surrounding estate includes much of the site of the Roman city of Verulamium.
