= Robert Grimston, 1st Baron Grimston of Westbury =

British Conservative politician

Baron Grimston of Westbury
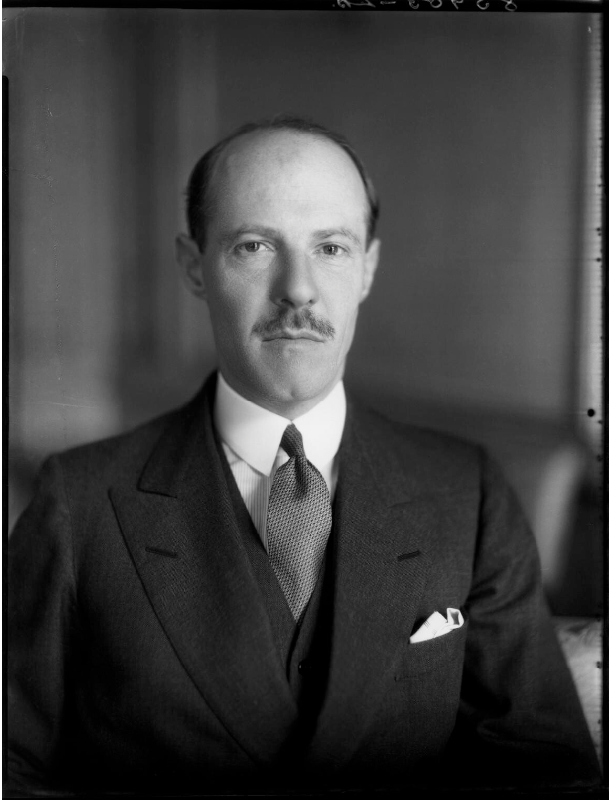

Deputy Chairman of Ways and Means
- In office 30 January 1962 – 15 October 1964
- Speaker: Harry Hylton-Foster
- Preceded by: William Anstruther-Gray
- Succeeded by: Samuel Storey

Parliamentary Secretary to the Ministry of Supply
- In office 23 May 1945 – 4 August 1945
- Prime Minister: Winston Churchill
- Preceded by: John Wilmot
- Succeeded by: William Leonard

Assistant Postmaster-General
- In office 4 March 1942 – 23 May 1945
- Prime Minister: Winston Churchill
- Preceded by: Allan Chapman
- Succeeded by: William Anstruther-Gray

Treasurer of the Household
- In office 12 November 1939 – 4 March 1942
- Prime Minister: Neville Chamberlain; Winston Churchill
- Preceded by: Charles Waterhouse
- Succeeded by: James Edmondson

Vice-Chamberlain of the Household
- In office 19 May 1938 – 12 November 1939
- Prime Minister: Neville Chamberlain
- Preceded by: Ronald Cross
- Succeeded by: James Edmondson

Lord Commissioner of the Treasury
- In office 19 October 1937 – 19 May 1938
- Prime Minister: Neville Chamberlain
- Preceded by: Ronald Cross
- Succeeded by: Stephen Furness

Member of Parliament for Westbury
- In office 27 October 1931 – 15 October 1964
- Preceded by: Richard Long
- Succeeded by: Dennis Walters

Personal details
- Born: Robert Villiers Grimston; 8 June 1897
- Died: 8 December 1979 (aged 82)
- Party: Conservative
- Parent: Robert Grimston (father)
- Education: Repton School
- Alma mater: University of London

Military service
- Branch/service: British Army
- Years of service: 1916–19
- Unit: Royal Garrison Artillery

Robert Villiers Grimston, 1st Baron Grimston of Westbury, 1st Baronet (8 June 1897 – 8 December 1979) was a British Conservative politician.

== Early life and career ==
Grimston was the eldest son of the Rev. and Hon. Robert Grimston, Canon of St Albans, and grandson of James Grimston, 2nd Earl of Verulam. Grimston was educated at Windlesham House School and Repton School, before going on to the City and Guilds Engineering College and the University of London.

=== Military service ===
During World War I, he was commissioned into the RGA (6th Howitzers) in 1916 and served in Thessaloniki and Palestine from 1916 to 1919.

== Political career ==
Grimston was elected as Conservative Member of Parliament (MP) for Westbury, Wiltshire in 1931, holding the seat until 1964. He served as a Junior Lord of the Treasury and Assistant Whip (unpaid) in 1937, Vice-Chamberlain of the Household from 1938 to 1939, Treasurer of the Household from 1939 to 1942. He then held junior ministerial office as Assistant Postmaster-General from 1942 to 1945 and as Parliamentary Secretary to the Ministry of Supply in 1945.

He was later Deputy Chairman of Ways and Means from 1962 to 1964, and was a member of the UK Delegation to the General Assembly of the United Nations in 1960.

Grimston was created a Baronet on 11 March 1952 and was raised to the peerage being created Baron Grimston of Westbury, of Westbury in the County of Wiltshire, on 11 December 1964.

== Coat of arms ==
Coat of arms of Robert Grimston, 1st Baron Grimston of Westbury
Crest A Stag's Head erased proper attired Or Escutcheon Quarterly: 1st and 4th, Argent on a Fess Sable three Rowels of six points pierced Gules in the dexter chief an Ermine Spot Sable (Grimston); 2nd, Sable a Fess dancetty between two Leopards' Faces Or (Luckyn); 3rd, Argent three Bugle Horns Sable stringed Gules (Forrester) Supporters Dexter: a Stag reguardant proper attired Or; Sinister: a Horse reguardant Argent Motto Mediocria Firma (Moderate things are stable)

== Family ==
Grimston's spouse was Sybil Rose Neumann. His daughter, the Hon. Rosemary Sybella Violet Grimston, married the actor Charles Edward Underdown, on the 10th. February 1953. Charles Underdown and Rosemary Grimston were sixth cousins, through their common ancestors Thomas Villiers, 1st Earl of Clarendon and Lady Charlotte Capell, according to Burke's Peerage, (Volume 2, page 1685, 107th. edition, 2003).

Parliament of the United Kingdom
Preceded by Richard Long	Member of Parliament for Westbury; 1931–1964	Succeeded by Dennis Walters
Political offices
Preceded by Ronald Cross	Vice-Chamberlain of the Household; 1938–1939	Succeeded by Sir James Edmondson
Preceded by Charles Waterhouse	Treasurer of the Household; 1939–1942	Succeeded by Sir James Edmondson
Peerage of the United Kingdom
New creation	Baron Grimston of Westbury; 1964–1979	Succeeded by Robert Grimston
Baronetage of the United Kingdom
New creation	Baronet (of Westbury, Wiltshire); 1952–1979	Succeeded by Robert Grimston
