= James Grimston, 3rd Viscount Grimston =

British peer

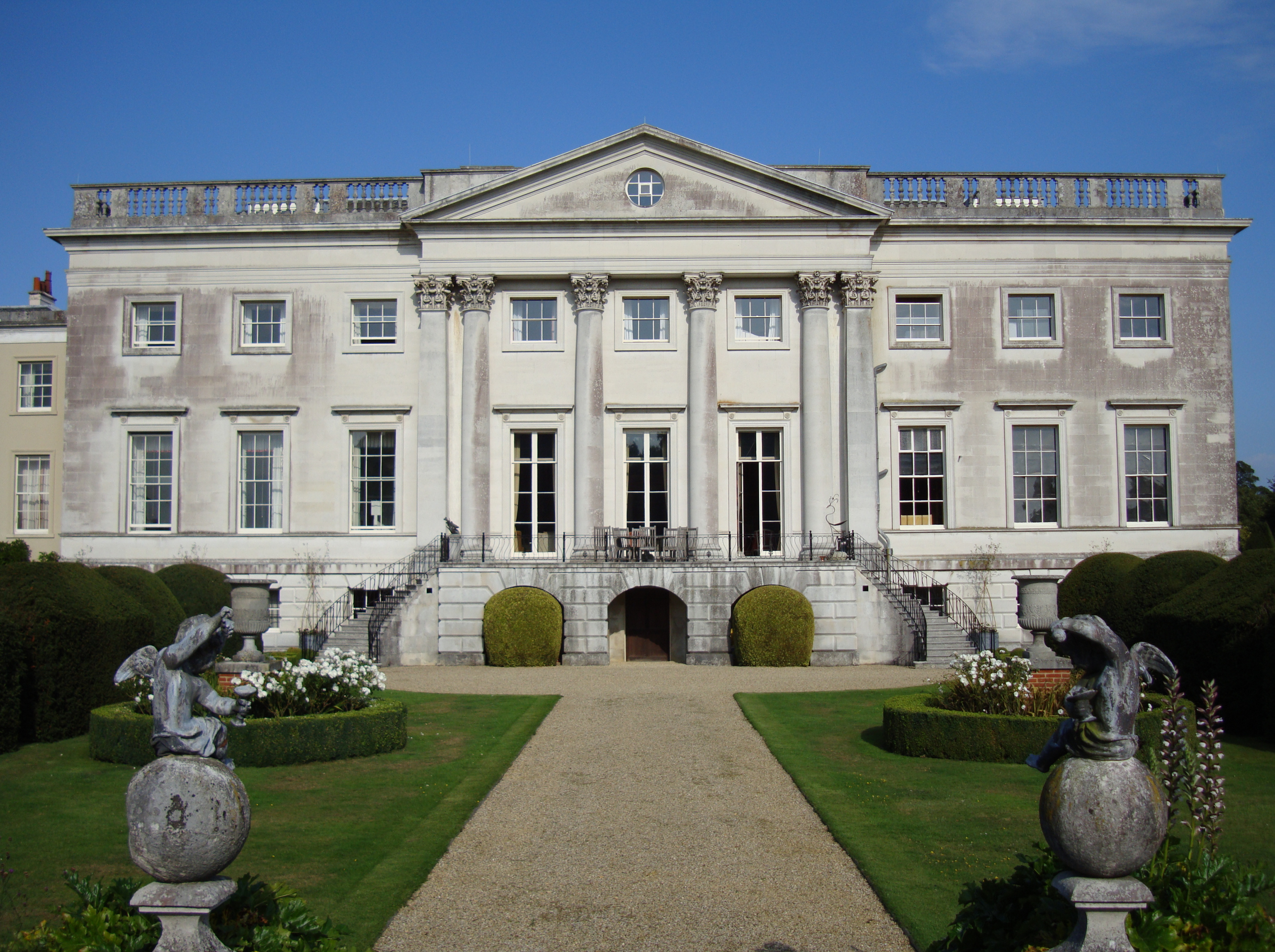
The "new" Gorhambury House was built by Viscount Grimston in 1777–84

James Bucknall Grimston, 3rd Viscount Grimston (9 May 1747 – 30 December 1808) was a British peer, born the heir to his Irish peerage, and Member of Parliament whose service in Parliament for seven years led to his, and his male descendants', ennoblement into the Peerage of Great Britain.

Grimston was the son of James Grimston, 2nd Viscount Grimston, and Mary Bucknall. He was educated at Eton and Trinity Hall, Cambridge. He succeeded his father in the viscountcy in 1773 but as this was an Irish peerage it did not entitle him to a seat in the House of Lords. He was instead elected to the House of Commons for St Albans in 1783, a seat he held until the next year's election, where he instead stood for and represented the larger, county-level seat of Hertfordshire from 1784 to 1790. In 1790 he was created Baron Verulam, of Gorhambury in the County of Hertford, in the Peerage of Great Britain, which gave him a seat in the House of Lords.

Lord Grimston married Harriot Walter (1756–1786), daughter of Edward Walter of Bury Hill, Westcott, Surrey and Harriot Forrester, daughter of George Forrester, 5th Lord Forrester. He died in December 1808, aged 61, and was succeeded in his titles by his son James, who was created Earl of Verulam in 1815.

== Notes ==
Parliament of Great Britain
Preceded by John Radcliffe; William Charles Sloper	Member of Parliament for St Albans; 1783–1784; With: William Charles Sloper	Succeeded by William Charles Sloper; William Grimston
Preceded by William Plumer; Thomas Halsey	Member of Parliament for Hertfordshire; 1784–1790; With: William Plumer	Succeeded by William Plumer; William Baker
Peerage of Ireland
Preceded by James Grimston	Viscount Grimston; 1773–1808	Succeeded by James Walter Grimston
Peerage of Great Britain
New creation	Baron Verulam; 1790–1808	Succeeded by James Walter Grimston
