= Baron Grimston of Westbury =

Title in the Peerage of the United Kingdom

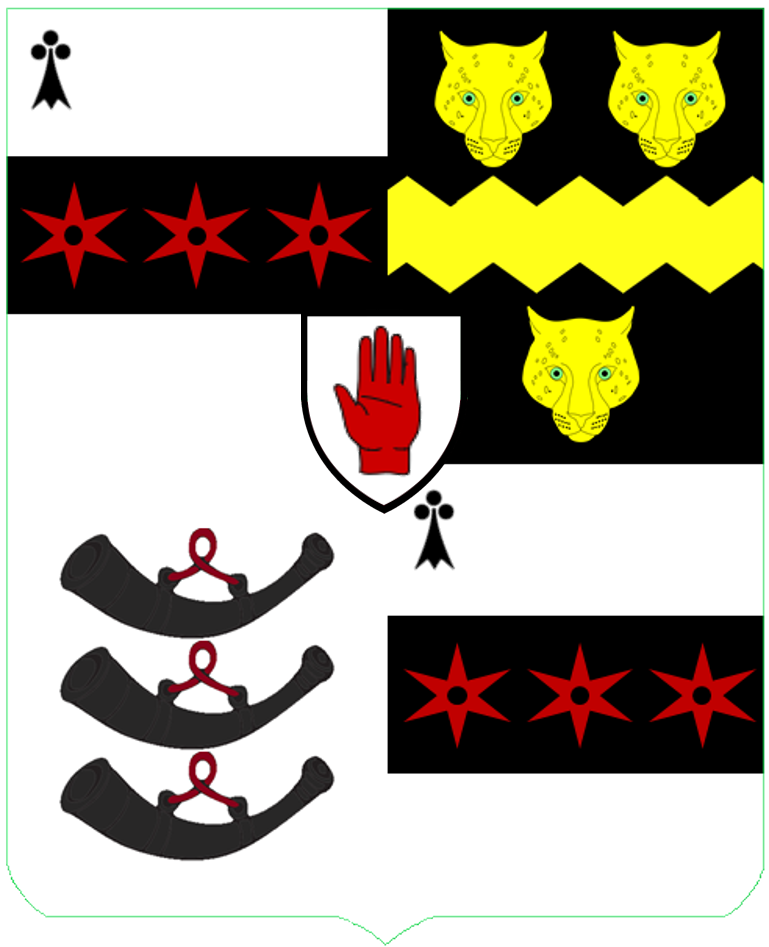
- Creation date: 1964
- Created by: Elizabeth II
- Peerage: United Kingdom
- First holder: Robert Grimston, 1st Baron Grimston of Westbury
- Present holder: Robert John Sylvester Grimston, 3rd Baron Grimston of Westbury
- Heir presumptive: Hon. Gerald Charles Walter Grimston
- Remainder to: 1st Baron's heirs male of the body lawfully begotten
- Status: Extant
- Motto: Mediocria Firma (Moderate things are stable)

Baron Grimston of Westbury, of Westbury in the County of Wiltshire, is a title in the Peerage of the United Kingdom. It was created in 1964 for the Conservative politician and former Deputy Speaker of the House of Commons, Sir Robert Grimston, 1st Baronet. He had already been created a baronet in 1952. Grimston was the son of Reverend Canon the Hon. Robert Grimston, third son of James Grimston, 2nd Earl of Verulam. As of 2017 the titles are held by his grandson, the third Baron, who succeeded his father in 2003.

The barony of Grimston of Westbury was one of the last hereditary baronies created in the Peerage of the United Kingdom.

== Barons Grimston of Westbury (1964) ==
- Robert Villiers Grimston, 1st Baron Grimston of Westbury (1897–1979)
- Robert Walter Sigismund Grimston, 2nd Baron Grimston of Westbury (1925–2003)
- Robert John Sylvester Grimston, 3rd Baron Grimston of Westbury (born 1951)

The heir presumptive is the present holder's brother, the Hon. Gerald Charles Walter Grimston (born 1953).

The heir presumptive's heir apparent is his son, Edward Charles Luckyn Grimston (born 1985)

== See also ==
- Earl of Verulam
