= Grimstone, North Yorkshire =

Hamlet and civil parish in North Yorkshire, England

Coordinates: 54.17136°N 1.05275°W

Grimstone
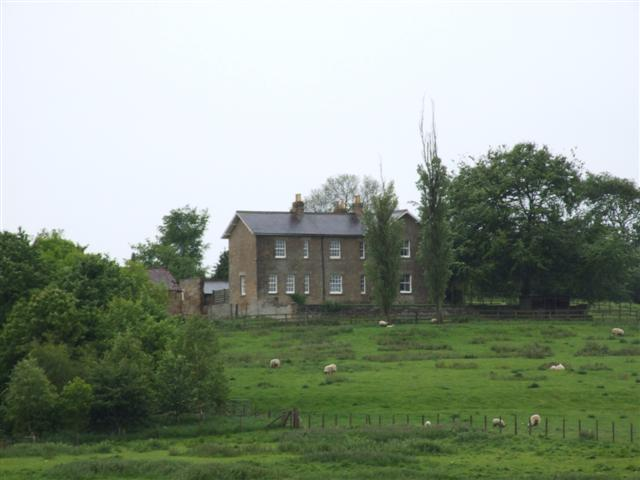
- Farm in Grimston

- Location within North Yorkshire
- Population: 60 (2015 estimate)
- OS grid reference: SE 619 754
- Civil parish: Grimstone
- Unitary authority: North Yorkshire
- Ceremonial county: North Yorkshire
- Region: Yorkshire and the Humber
- Country: England
- Sovereign state: United Kingdom
- Post town: YORK
- Postcode district: YO62
- Dialling code: 01347
- Police: North Yorkshire
- Fire: North Yorkshire
- Ambulance: Yorkshire
- UK Parliament: Thirsk and Malton

Grimstone or Grimston is a hamlet and civil parish in North Yorkshire, England. It lies beside the main B1363 road between York and Helmsley. Grimston lies in the Howardian Hills just south of the North York Moors National Park and close to Ampleforth Abbey and College. In 2015 it had an estimated population of 60.

It was part of the Ryedale district between 1974 and 2023. It is now administered by North Yorkshire Council.

Grimston is small, and is made up of around 14 households. Historically, it originates from an old manorial estate, and several of the buildings still hold related names: Grimston Manor, Grimston Manor Farm, Grimston Lodge, Grimston Cottage and Grimston Grange. Grimston was recorded in the Domesday Book as Grimeston.
