= Earl of Verulam =

Earldom in the Peerage of the United Kingdom

- Blazon Arms: Quarterly: 1st & 4th, Argent, on a Fess Sable, three Rowels of six-points Or, pierced Gules, in the dexter chief point an Ermine Spot (Grimston); 2nd, Sable, a Fess dancettée, between two Leopard’s Faces Or (Luckyn); 3rd, Argent, three Bugle Horns Sable, stringed Gules (Forrester) Crest: A Stag’s Head erased proper, attired Or. Supporters: Dexter: A stag reguardant proper, attired Or; Sinister: A Griffin reguardant Or.
- Creation date: 24 November 1815
- Created by: The Prince Regent (acting on behalf of his father, King George III)
- Peerage: Peerage of the United Kingdom
- First holder: James Grimston, 4th Viscount Grimston
- Present holder: John Grimston, 7th Earl of Verulam
- Heir apparent: James Grimston, Viscount Grimston
- Subsidiary titles: Viscount Grimston (1719); Viscount Grimston (1815); Lord Forrester of Corstorphine; Baron Dunboyne; Baron Verulam; Baronet 'of Little Waltham'
- Status: Extant
- Seat: Gorhambury House
- Motto: MEDIOCTRIA FIRMA (Moderate things are stable)

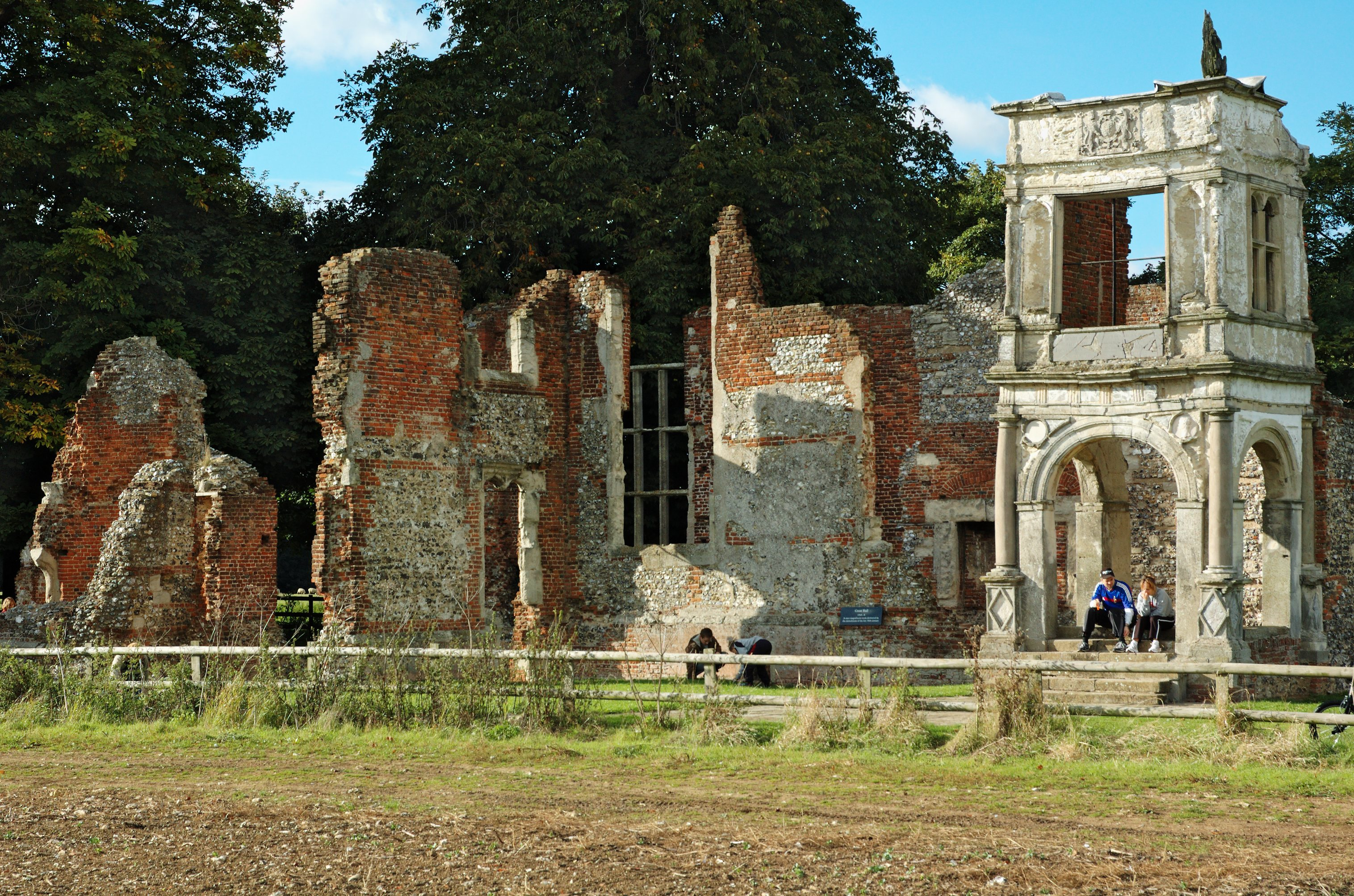
The ruins of Old Gorhambury House, the ramshackle medieval family seat in England from the 1670s until the family built the new Gorhambury House

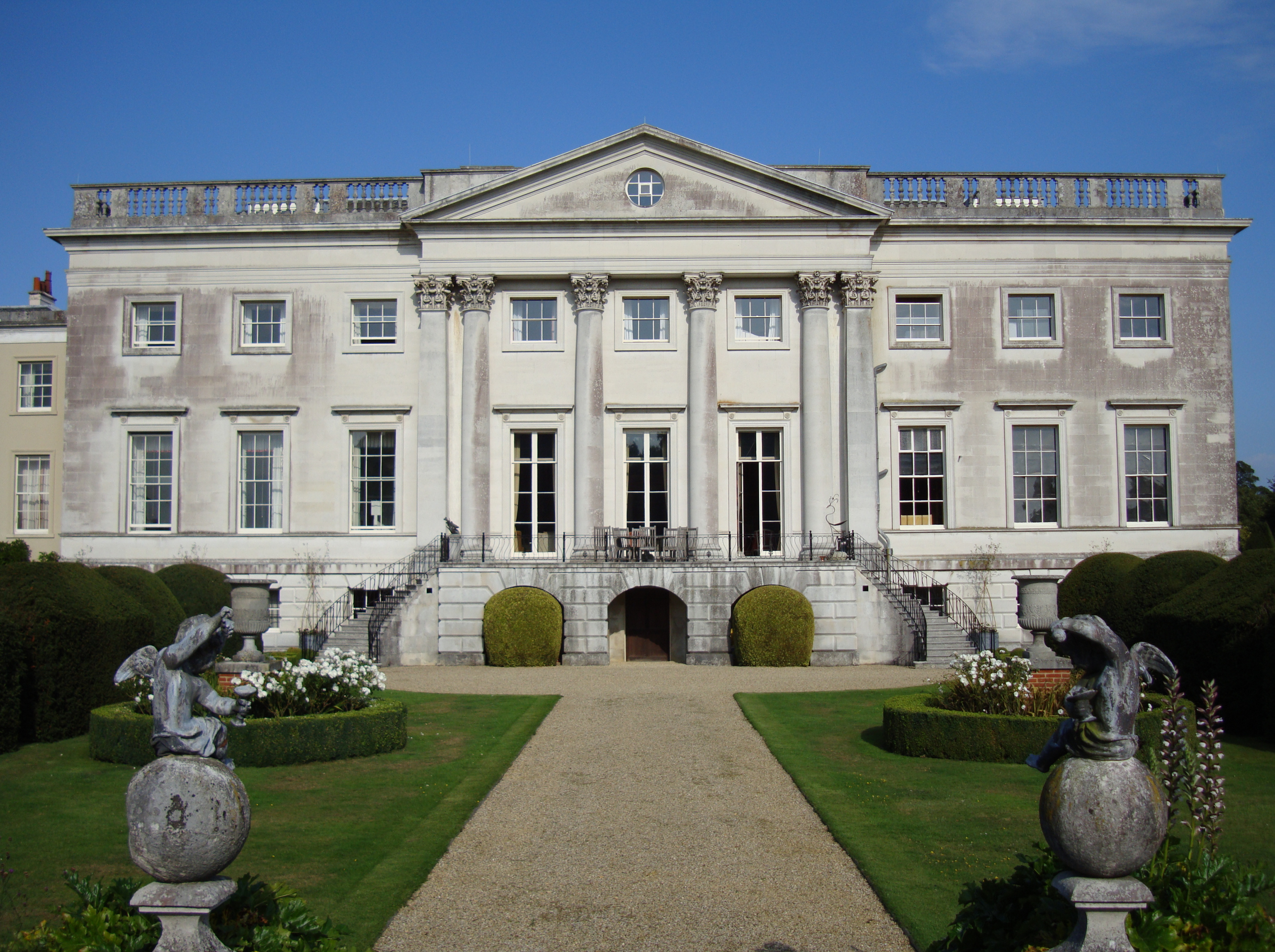
The "new" Gorhambury House was built by Viscount Grimston in 1777–84

Earl of Verulam is a title in the Peerage of the United Kingdom. It was created in 1815 for James Grimston, 4th Viscount Grimston. He was made Viscount Grimston (in the peerage of the United Kingdom) at the same time. Verulam had previously represented St Albans (Roman Verulamium) in the House of Commons. In 1808 he had also succeeded his maternal cousin as tenth Lord Forrester (in the Peerage of Scotland). He was succeeded by his son, the second Earl.

Grimston was a Tory politician and held minor office in the first two governments of the Earl of Derby. His son, the third Earl, represented St Albans in Parliament as a Conservative. His grandson, the sixth Earl (who succeeded his elder brother) was nominated to the traditionally safe seat of St Albans for the party. As of 2017 the titles are held by his son, the seventh Earl, who succeeded in 1973.

The titles of Viscount Grimston and Baron Dunboyne had been created in 1719 in the Peerage of Ireland for William Grimston, Member of Parliament for St Albans. Born William Luckyn, he was the great-nephew of Sir Samuel Grimston, 3rd Baronet, of Bradfield (a title which became extinct upon his death in 1700), whose surname he assumed on succeeding to his estates. In 1737 he also succeeded his elder brother as fifth Baronet of Little Waltham (see below). He was succeeded by his son, the second Viscount. He also represented St Albans in the House of Commons. His son, the third Viscount, was Member of Parliament for St Albans and Hertfordshire. In 1790 he was created Baron Verulam, of Gorhambury in the County of Hertford, in the Peerage of Great Britain. He was succeeded by his son, the aforementioned fourth Viscount, who was created Earl of Verulam in 1815.

The Luckyn baronetcy, of Little Waltham in the County of Essex, was created in the Baronetage of England in 1629 for William Luckyn. The second Baronet represented Harwich in Parliament. The fourth Baronet was succeeded by his younger brother, the aforementioned William Grimston, 1st Viscount Grimston.

Lord Verulam thus holds titles in England, Scotland, Ireland, Great Britain and the United Kingdom.

Another member of the Grimston family was Robert Grimston, 1st Baron Grimston of Westbury. He was the son of Reverend Canon the Hon. Robert Grimston, third son of the second Earl of Verulam.

The family seat is Gorhambury House, near St Michael, Hertfordshire.

== Luckyn (later Grimston) baronets, of Little Waltham (1629) ==
- Sir William Luckyn, 1st Baronet (1594–1660)
- Sir Capell Luckyn, 2nd Baronet (1622–1680)
- Sir William Luckyn, 3rd Baronet (died c. 1708)
- Sir Harbottle Luckyn, 4th Baronet (1683–1737)
- Sir William Grimston, 5th Baronet (c. 1684–1756) (had already been created Viscount Grimston in 1719)

== Viscount Grimston (1719) ==
- William Grimston, 1st Viscount Grimston (c. 1684–1756)
- James Grimston, 2nd Viscount Grimston (1711–1773)
- James Bucknall Grimston, 3rd Viscount Grimston (1747–1808)
- James Walter Grimston, 4th Viscount Grimston (1775–1845) (created Earl of Verulam in 1815)

== Earl of Verulam (1815) ==
- James Walter Grimston, 1st Earl of Verulam (1775–1845)
- James Walter Grimston, 2nd Earl of Verulam (1809–1895)
- James Walter Grimston, 3rd Earl of Verulam (1852–1924)
- James Walter Grimston, 4th Earl of Verulam (1880–1949)
- James Brabazon Grimston, 5th Earl of Verulam (1910–1960)
- John Grimston, 6th Earl of Verulam (1912–1973)
- John Duncan Grimston, 7th Earl of Verulam (born 1951)

The heir apparent is the present holder's son James Walter Grimston, Viscount Grimston (born 1978)
The heir apparent's heir apparent is his son, the Hon. John Innes Archie Grimston (born 2010).

== See also ==
- Baron Grimston of Westbury
- Lord Forrester
- Baron Dunboyne
- Baron Verulam
- Grimston baronets of Bradfield

== Sources ==
- Kidd, Charles & Williamson, David (editors). Debrett's Peerage and Baronetage (1990 edition). New York: St Martin's Press, 1990.
- Leigh Rayment's Peerage Pages
