= List of museums in Wales =

This list of museums in Wales contains museums which are defined for this context as institutions (including nonprofit organisations, government entities, and private businesses) that collect and care for objects of cultural, artistic, scientific, or historical interest and make their collections or related exhibits available for public viewing. Also included are non-profit art galleries and university art galleries.

Museums that exist only in cyberspace (i.e. virtual museums) are not included. Those marked 'NMW' are part of the network of National Museum Wales.

Name	Town/City	Principal area	Region	Type	Summary
Beaumaris Castle	Beaumaris	Anglesey	North Wales	Historic house	Medieval castle
Beaumaris Courthouse	Beaumaris	Anglesey	North Wales	Law enforcement	website, also known as Llys Biwmares Beaumaris Court, dates to 1614
Beaumaris Gaol	Beaumaris	Anglesey	North Wales	Prison	19th-century prison
Canolfan Ucheldre Centre	Holyhead	Anglesey	North Wales	Art	website, community arts centre with exhibit gallery for contemporary art and craft
Copper Kingdom Centre	Amlwch	Anglesey	North Wales	Local	website, local history, copper and shipbuilding industry
Haulfre Stables	Beaumaris	Anglesey	North Wales	Transport	Open by appointment only, Victorian harness and saddlery, carts and carriages
Holyhead Maritime Museum	Holyhead	Anglesey	North Wales	Maritime	Located in an 1858 lifeboat station, maritime and social history
Llynnon Mill	Holyhead	Anglesey	North Wales	Mill	18th-century windmill
Menai Heritage Bridges Exhibition	Menai Bridge	Anglesey	North Wales	Technology	website, history and construction of the Menai Suspension Bridge and the Britannia Bridge
Moelfre Seawatch Centre	Moelfre	Anglesey	North Wales	Maritime	Also known as RNLI Gwylfan Seawatch Centre, includes a lifeboat, maritime artifacts, marine life and environment
Oriel Ynys Môn	Llangefni	Anglesey	North Wales	Multiple	Art, culture, social history of Anglesey
Penmaenmawr Museum	Penmaenmawr	Conwy	North Wales	Local	website, local history museum and community archive for Penmaenmawr
Plas Newydd	Llanfairpwllgwyngyll	Anglesey	North Wales	Historic house	Operated by the National Trust, 18th-century house with 1930s interior, military museum of the 1st Marquess of Anglesey, garden, arboretum
South Stack Lighthouse	Holy Island	Anglesey	North Wales	Maritime	Historic lighthouse, engine room and exhibits
Stone Science	Pentraeth	Anglesey	North Wales	Natural history	Dinosaurs, fossils, rocks, minerals
Swtan Heritage Museum	Rhydwyn	Anglesey	North Wales	Historic house	website, 16th-century Welsh cottage with a thatched roof, early 20th-century interior, exhibits of art and rural life
Tacla Taid	Rhydwyn	Anglesey	North Wales	Transport	website, also known as Anglesey Transport and Agriculture Museum, cars, motorbikes, commercial and farm vehicles and static engines
Abertillery & District Museum	Abertillery	Blaenau Gwent	South Wales	Multiple	website, local history, period room and farm displays, mining, culture, Roman artifacts
Bedwellty House	Tredegar	Blaenau Gwent	South Wales	Historic house	Early 19th-century ironmaster's residence and gardens
Blaina Heritage Action Group Museum	Tredegar	Blaenau Gwent	South Wales	Local	website, local history
Brynmawr & District Museum	Brynmawr	Blaenau Gwent	South Wales	Local	website, local history, Brynmawr Furniture pieces made during the Brynmawr Experiment
Tredegar Local History Museum	Tredegar	Blaenau Gwent	South Wales	Local	Located in the town library, local history, industry
Cefn Junction Signal Box	Cefn Cribwr	Bridgend County Borough	South Wales	Local	website, located in a 1898 signal box, local history with an emphasis on rail and coal mining heritage,
Porthcawl Museum	Porthcawl	Bridgend County Borough	South Wales	Local	website, local history
St John's House	Bridgend	Bridgend County Borough	South Wales	Local	website, local history
Caerphilly Castle	Caerphilly	Caerphilly	South Wales	Historic house	Medieval castle, replica siege engines, exhibits on other castles in Wales
Llancaiach Fawr	Nelson	Caerphilly	South Wales	Living	1645 period home, at the height of the English Civil War when King Charles I of England visited the house to persuade its owner not to change his allegiance
Winding House	New Tredegar	Caerphilly	South Wales	Local	website, local history, coal mining, winding engine
Butetown History and Arts Centre	Butetown	Cardiff	South Wales	Multiple	Local history, culture, art
Cardiff Bay Visitor Centre	Cardiff	Cardiff	South Wales	Local	Includes exhibits of local history, culture, located in the Wales Millennium Centre
Cardiff Castle	Cardiff	Cardiff	South Wales	Historic house	Medieval castle and Victorian architecture Gothic revival mansion
Cardiff Story	Cardiff	Cardiff	South Wales	Local	City's history, culture
Castell Coch	Tongwynlais	Cardiff	South Wales	Historic house	Operated by Cadw, late 19th-century "fairy-tale" Victorian Gothic castle with lavish furnishings
Chapter Arts Centre	Canton	Cardiff	South Wales	Art	Arts centre for international art, performance and film
Craft in the Bay	Cardiff	Cardiff	South Wales	Art	Contemporary crafts gallery of the Makers Guild in Wales
Doctor Who Exhibition Centre	Cardiff	Cardiff	South Wales	Media	Artifacts from the Doctor Who television series
Firing Line: Cardiff Castle Museum of the Welsh Soldier	Cardiff	Cardiff	South Wales	Military	Located at Cardiff Castle, history of the Welch Regiment
The Gate	Roath	Cardiff	South Wales	Art	Arts centre with exhibit gallery
Insole Court	Llandaff	Cardiff	South Wales	Historic house	Victorian mansion
National Museum Cardiff	Cardiff	Cardiff	South Wales	Multiple	(NMW) Art, archaeology, natural history, dinosaurs, geology, decorative arts
Norwegian Church Arts Centre	Cardiff	Cardiff	South Wales	Art	Arts centre with gallery
Pierhead	Cardiff	Cardiff	South Wales	History	Late 19th-century building with Welsh history exhibits
St Fagans National History Museum	St Fagans	Cardiff	South Wales	Open air	(NMW) Over forty buildings including a Celtic village, Elizabethan manor house, chapel, medieval church, schoolhouse, tollbooth, farm,
Techniquest	Cardiff	Cardiff	South Wales	Science	Hands-on science exhibits
Third Floor Gallery	Cardiff	Cardiff	South Wales	Photography	Photography gallery of national and international contemporary photography
Wales Millennium Centre	Cardiff	Cardiff	South Wales	Art	Performing arts centre with exhibit gallery
Bro Aman Heritage Room	Ammanford	Carmarthenshire	South Wales	Local history	Located in the Ammanford Town Library
Carmarthenshire County Museum	Carmarthen	Carmarthenshire	South Wales	Multiple	Local history, culture, art gallery, furniture, decorative arts, 19th-century schoolroom, the inside of a Carmarthenshire farmhouse a clogmaker's workshop
Dolaucothi Gold Mines	Pumsaint	Carmarthenshire	South Wales	Mining	Operated by the National Trust, Roman surface and deep gold mines
Dylan Thomas Boathouse	Laugharne	Carmarthenshire	South Wales	Historic house	Final home of poet Dylan Thomas
Kidwelly Industrial Museum	Kidwelly	Carmarthenshire	South Wales	Industry	Tinplate industry buildings and equipment
Museum of Speed	Pendine	Carmarthenshire	South Wales	Automotive	Use of Pendine Sands for land speed record attempts
National Coracle Centre	Cenarth	Carmarthenshire	South Wales	Maritime	Collection of coracles
National Wool Museum	Llandysul	Carmarthenshire	South Wales	Industry	(NMW) Woolen mill, textiles gallery
Newton House	Llandeilo	Carmarthenshire	South Wales	Historic house	Operated by the National Trust, 1912 period house in extensive park, nearby Dinefwr Castle ruins
Oriel Myrddin Gallery	Carmarthen	Carmarthenshire	South Wales	Art	website, contemporary art gallery
Parc Howard Museum	Llanelli	Carmarthenshire	South Wales	Multiple	Local pottery, art, decorative arts, local history
West Wales Museum of Childhood	Llangeler	Carmarthenshire	South Wales	Toy	Toys, dolls, model trains, model cars, teddy bears, toy soldiers, tin toys, costumes, pinball machines, games, period schoolroom, household items
Aberystwyth Arts Centre	Aberystwyth	Ceredigion	Mid Wales	Art	Part of Aberystwyth University, features exhibit galleries for art, ceramics
Ceredigion Museum	Aberystwyth	Ceredigion	Mid Wales	Local	Local history, archaeology, natural history, Welsh furniture, costumes, farming and agriculture items
Internal Fire – Museum of Power	Tanygroes	Ceredigion	Mid Wales	Technology	Internal combustion and steam engines
Lampeter Museum	Lampeter	Ceredigion	Mid Wales	Local	Local history exhibits in the town library
Llanerchaeron	Ciliau Aeron	Ceredigion	Mid Wales	Historic house	Operated by the National Trust, 18th-century Welsh minor gentry estate with dairy, laundry, brewery, salting house, walled kitchen gardens, organic farm
Llanon Cottage	Llanon	Ceredigion	Mid Wales	Historic house	website, Tudor cottage with original straw rope underthatch
Llywernog Silver-Lead Mine	Ponterwyd	Ceredigion	Mid Wales	Mining	website, 18th-century silver mine, buildings, equipment, tramways
New Quay Heritage Centre	New Quay	Ceredigion	Mid Wales	Local	website, local history exhibits
School of Art Gallery and Museum at Aberystwyth University	Aberystwyth	Ceredigion	Mid Wales	Art	website, fine art, photography, prints and drawings, crafts and decorative art
Strata Florida Abbey	Pontrhydfendigaid	Ceredigion	Mid Wales	Archaeology	Remains of a medieval Cistercian abbey
Tregaron Kite Centre and Museum	Tregaron	Ceredigion	Mid Wales	Natural history	website, kites and other area birds, Tregaron Bog, local history, Victorian schoolroom
Welsh Quilt Centre	Lampeter	Ceredigion	Mid Wales	Art	website, quilts and textile exhibits
Aberconwy House	Conwy	Conwy	North Wales	Historic house	website, operated by the National Trust, medieval merchant's house with rooms from different periods
Conwy Castle	Conwy	Conwy	North Wales	Historic house	Medieval castle
Conwy Mussel Museum	Conwy	Conwy	North Wales	Maritime	website, pearl fishing
Conwy Suspension Bridge	Conwy	Conwy	North Wales	Technology	Operated by the National Trust, 1826 version of the Menai Suspension Bridge, now a footbridge, 1890s period toll house
Conwy Valley Railway Museum	Betws-y-Coed	Conwy	North Wales	Railway	Railway equipment, miniature and model railways, memorabilia
Home Front Experience	Llandudno	Conwy	North Wales	Living	website, life in Britain during World War II
Llandudno Museum	Llandudno	Conwy	North Wales	Local	website, local history, culture, copper mining, Welsh kitchen, art
Mostyn	Llandudno	Conwy	North Wales	Art	Contemporary art gallery
New York Cottages	Penmaenmawr	Conwy	North Wales	Historic house	website, 1840s house for local quarry workers, local history, industry
Plas Mawr	Conwy	Conwy	North Wales	Historic house	16th-century Elizabethan town house
Royal Cambrian Academy of Art	Conwy	Conwy	North Wales	Art	Hosts 8-10 exhibits a year
Sir Henry Jones Museum	Llangernyw	Conwy	North Wales	Historic house	website, Victorian childhood home of philosopher and academic Sir Henry Jones
Smallest House in Great Britain	Conwy	Conwy	North Wales	Historic house	16th-century house measuring 3.05 metre by 1.8 metre (10 feet by 6 feet)
Tŷ Mawr Wybrnant	Penmachno	Conwy	North Wales	Historic house	Operated by the National Trust, 16th-century stone-built upland farmhouse, birthplace of Bishop William Morgan, the first translator of the Bible into Welsh, collection of bibles
Bodelwyddan Castle	Bodelwyddan	Denbighshire	North Wales	Multiple	Historic house with Victorian period rooms, art exhibits from the National Portrait Gallery, gardens, parkland
Llangollen Motor Museum	Llangollen	Denbighshire	North Wales	Automobile	Cars, motorcycles, memorabilia and artifacts
Llangollen Museum	Llangollen	Denbighshire	North Wales	Local	website, local history, culture
Nantclwyd y Dre	Ruthin	Denbighshire	North Wales	Historic house	15th-century timbered house with rooms from different periods up to the 1940s
Plas Newydd	Llangollen	Denbighshire	North Wales	Historic house	Late 18th-century Gothic cottage house
Rhyl Miniature Railway	Rhyl	Denbighshire	North Wales	Railway	Miniature railway and museum
Rhyl Museum	Rhyl	Denbighshire	North Wales	Local	website, local history, culture
Ruthin Gaol	Ruthin	Denbighshire	North Wales	Prison	19th-century Victorian prison dating back to the 17th century
Ruthin Craft Centre	Ruthin	Denbighshire	North Wales	Art	Contemporary crafts centre with exhibit galleries, artist studios, retail gallery, education and residency workshops
Wireless in Wales Museum	Denbigh	Denbighshire	North Wales	Wireless radio	website, collection of radios and information, displaying some very early and rare sets dating from the 1920s to the 1960s
Buckley Library, Museum and Gallery	Buckley	Flintshire	North Wales	Local	website Local history, contains items from former potteries in the town
Greenfield Valley Heritage Park	Holywell	Flintshire	North Wales	Industry	Open air park with a farm museum, former factories for making cotton, brass items, copper sheets, wire
Mold Library, Museum and Gallery	Mold	Flintshire	North Wales	Local	website, local history, author Daniel Owen
St Winefride's Well	Holywell	Flintshire	North Wales	Religious	Shrine with museum about its history
Bocs	Caernarfon	Gwynedd	North Wales	Art	website, Creative Industries Centre for young artists, art gallery
Cae'r Gors	Rhosgadfan	Gwynedd	North Wales	Literature	website, restored birthplace of author Kate Roberts
Caernarfon Airworld Museum	Caernarfon	Gwynedd	North Wales	Aviation	website, collection of retired aircraft, history of mountain rescue, located at Caernarfon Airport, the airfield of the former RAF Llandwrog
Caernarfon Castle	Caernarfon	Gwynedd	North Wales	Historic house	Medieval fortress castle, site of investiture of the Prince of Wales, houses the Royal Welch Fusiliers Museum
Lasynys Fawr	Harlech	Gwynedd	North Wales	Historical house	website, restored 15th-century home of poet Ellis Wynne
Llechwedd Slate Caverns	Blaenau Ffestiniog	Gwynedd	North Wales	Mining	Slate mine quarry and tram
Lloyd George Museum	Llanystumdwy	Gwynedd	North Wales	Historic house	Late 19th-century boyhood home of British Prime Minister David Lloyd George
Narrow Gauge Railway Museum	Tywyn	Gwynedd	North Wales	Railway	Locomotives and artifacts from over 80 British narrow gauge railways
National Slate Museum	Llanberis	Gwynedd	North Wales	Industry	(NMW) Formerly the Welsh Slate Museum, former slate quarry
Oriel Pendeitsh	Caernarfon	Gwynedd	North Wales	Art	website, exhibition space
Oriel Plas Glyn-y-Weddw	Pwllheli	Gwynedd	North Wales	Art	website, art gallery
Penrhyn Castle	Llandygai	Gwynedd	North Wales	Historic house	19th-century fantasy castle, operated by the National Trust
Penrhyn Castle Railway Museum	Llandygai	Gwynedd	North Wales	Railway	Industrial railway locomotives
Porthmadog Maritime Museum	Porthmadog	Gwynedd	North Wales	Maritime	website, schooners built in the town and the men who sailed in them
Quaker Heritage Centre	Dolgellau	Gwynedd	North Wales	Religious	History of the local Quaker community that later emigrated to Pennsylvania
Royal Welch Fusiliers Museum	Caernarfon	Gwynedd	North Wales	Military	Located at Caernarfon Castle, regimental uniforms, weapons, memorabilia
Segontium	Caernarfon	Gwynedd	North Wales	Archaeology	Excavated Roman fort and visitor center with artifacts
Sygun Copper Mine	Beddgelert	Gwynedd	North Wales	Mining	Underground tours of the Victorian copper mine
Storiel	Bangor	Gwynedd	North Wales	Multiple	website, local history, art, culture, Welsh furniture, costumes, archaeology, formerly the Gwynedd Museum and Art Gallery
Tŷ Siamas	Dolgellau	Gwynedd	North Wales	Music	National centre for Welsh folk music
Cyfarthfa Castle	Merthyr Tydfil	Merthyr Tydfil	South Wales	Multiple	Local and social history, art, decorative arts
Joseph Parry's Cottage	Merthyr Tydfil	Merthyr Tydfil	South Wales	Historic house	website, 1840s period ironworker's cottage, birthplace of composer Joseph Parry
Abergavenny Museum	Abergavenny	Monmouthshire	South Wales	Local	Local history, culture, period saddlers shop, Victorian farmhouse kitchen, 1930s grocery shop, changing exhibits of art, history, culture
Caldicot Castle	Caldicot	Monmouthshire	South Wales	Historic house	Medieval castle with Victorian furnishings, local history artifacts
Chepstow Museum	Chepstow	Monmouthshire	South Wales	Local	Local history
Monmouth Museum	Monmouth	Monmouthshire	South Wales	Biographical	Includes the former Nelson Museum about Admiral Horatio Nelson, local history,
Monmouth Regimental Museum	Monmouth	Monmouthshire	South Wales	Military	History of the Royal Monmouthshire Royal Engineers
Priory Church of St Mary	Abergavenny	Monmouthshire	South Wales	Religious	Exhibits in the tithe barn about the priory, 24 foot tapestry of town history
Usk Rural Life Museum	Usk	Monmouthshire	South Wales	Agriculture	website, farm tools, equipment, scale model horse-drawn vehicles, corn dollies, period household and trade displays
Cefn Coed Colliery Museum	Crynant	Neath Port Talbot	South Wales	Mining	Former coal mine with buildings, equipment, tram
Margam Stones Museum	Margam	Neath Port Talbot	South Wales	Religious	Operated by Cadw, inscribed pre- Romanesque, Roman and Celtic stones and crosses
South Wales Miners' Museum	Cymmer	Neath Port Talbot	South Wales	Mining	Former coal mine with buildings, equipment, miner's cottage, stable, blacksmith
Welsh Museum of Fire	Skewen	Neath Port Talbot	South Wales	Firefighting	website, fire engines, equipment, memorabilia, open by appointment
Fourteen Locks Canal and Heritage Centre	Newport	Newport	South Wales	Transport	Heritage of the Monmouthshire and Brecon Canal
National Roman Legion Museum	Caerleon	Newport	South Wales	Archaeology	(NMW) Artifacts and excavations from the Roman legion fortress and settlement and other Roman sites in Wales
Isca Augusta amphitheatre, barracks, fortress walls and Caerleon Roman Fortress and Baths	Caerleon	Newport	South Wales	Archaeology	Artifacts and excavations from the Roman legion fortress and settlement, operated by Cadw
Newport Museum and Art Gallery	Newport	Newport	South Wales	Multiple	Local history, art gallery, local Roman history and archaeology, natural history, social history, industry
Newport Ship	Newport	Newport	South Wales	Maritime	15th-century sailing vessel undergoing restoration, viewed on open days
Newport Transporter Bridge Visitor Centre	Newport	Newport	South Wales	Transport	History and construction of the bridge and other transporter bridges
Riverfront Arts Centre	Newport	Newport	South Wales	Art	Arts centre with gallery
Tredegar House	Newport	Newport	South Wales	Historic house	17th-century Charles II country house mansion, operated by the National Trust
Carew Castle	Carew	Pembrokeshire	South Wales	Multiple	Medieval castle remains and 19th-century tidal grinding mill
Carew Cheriton Control Tower	Carew	Pembrokeshire	South Wales	Military	History of RAF Carew Cheriton including the World War II RAF control tower (Watch Office), Avro Anson aircraft and air raid shelter
Castell Henllys	Crymych	Pembrokeshire	South Wales	Open air	Reconstructed Iron Age fort
Fleets to Flying Boat Centre	Pembroke Dock	Pembrokeshire	South Wales	Multiple	website, Sunderland flying boats, area WWII history
Haverfordwest Town Museum	Haverfordwest	Pembrokeshire	South Wales	Local	Local history, industry, artifacts from Haverfordwest Castle
Milford Haven Museum	Milford Haven	Pembrokeshire	South Wales	Local	Local history, maritime history, industries, railroads
Narberth Museum	Narberth	Pembrokeshire	South Wales	Local	website, local history, culture
Oriel y Parc	St Davids	Pembrokeshire	South Wales	Art	website, art gallery, focus is the landscapes of Pembrokeshire, houses the visitor centre for the Pembrokeshire Coast National Park
Pembrock Dock Heritage Centre	Pembroke Dock	Pembrokeshire	South Wales	Multiple	website, located in a Martello tower, local history, military and maritime history
Pembrokeshire Motor Museum	Simpson Cross	Pembrokeshire	South Wales	Automobile	Vintage cars, currently closed
Penrhos Cottage	Maenclochog	Pembrokeshire	South Wales	Historic house	Open by appointment, tiny early 19th-century cottage
Picton Castle	Haverfordwest	Pembrokeshire	South Wales	Historic house	Medieval castle, art gallery, gardens
Scolton Manor	Haverfordwest	Pembrokeshire	South Wales	Multiple	Victorian manor house with period rooms, exhibits on local history, agriculture, rural life, railways, industry, science
Techniquest	Narberth	Pembrokeshire	South Wales	Science	
Tenby Museum and Art Gallery	Tenby	Pembrokeshire	South Wales	Multiple	Local history, art, natural history, geology, archaeology, maritime heritage
Tudor Merchant's House	Tenby	Pembrokeshire	South Wales	Historic house	Operated by the National Trust, late 15th-century Tudor period house
Abbey-Cwm-Hir Hall	Nr. Llandrindod Wells	Powys	Mid Wales	Historic house	19th-century neo-Elizabethan country house, gardens
Andrew Logan Museum of Sculpture	Berriew	Powys	Mid Wales	Art	website, works by Andrew Logan
Brecon Cathedral Heritage Centre	Brecon	Powys	Mid Wales	Religious	Located in a 17th-century tithe barn, history of the cathedral
Centre for Alternative Technology	Machynlleth	Powys	Mid Wales	Science	Exhibits about alternative technologies, sustainable living, the environment
Howell Harris Museum	Aberhonddu	Powys	Mid Wales	Religious	Life of 18th-century Methodist leader Howell Harris, known as Trefeca
Judge's Lodging Museum	Presteigne	Powys	Mid Wales	Historic house	website, 1870s period house with restored judge's apartments, servants’ quarters and courtroom
Llanidloes Museum	Llanidloes	Powys	Mid Wales	Local	website, local history, industry, Victorian period rooms, natural history
Mid Wales Arts Centre	Caersws	Powys	Mid Wales	Art	website, includes collection of works by Stefan Knapp
Minerva Arts Centre	Llanidloes	Powys	Mid Wales	Art	website, exhibits of quilts and textiles by the Quilt Association
MOMA, Wales	Machynlleth	Powys	Mid Wales	Art	Contemporary art exhibits
National Cycle Museum	Llandrindod Wells	Powys	Mid Wales	Transport	Features over 260 bicycles
Newtown Textile Museum	Newtown	Powys	Mid Wales	Industry	website, typical early 19th-century hand weaving shop, open on special occasions
The Old Bell Museum	Montgomery	Powys	Mid Wales	Local history	Housed in a 16th-century inn
Oriel Davies Gallery	Newtown	Powys	Mid Wales	Art	website, contemporary art and craft
Owain Glyndwr Centre	Machynlleth	Powys	Mid Wales	Biographical	History of Owain Glyndŵr, 14th-century Welsh ruler and the last native Welsh person to hold the title Prince of Wales
Powis Castle	Welshpool	Powys	Mid Wales	Historic house	Operated by the National Trust, castle with paintings, sculpture, furniture, tapestries, museum of 18th-century artifacts from India, gardens
Powysland Museum	Welshpool	Powys	Mid Wales	Local	website, local history, culture, farming, archaeology, military
Radnorshire Museum	Llandrindod Wells	Powys	Mid Wales	Local	website, local history, archaeology, natural history including fossils, social history of the former county of Radnorshire
Rhayader Museum & Gallery	Rhayader	Powys	Mid Wales	Local	website
Robert Owen Museum	Newtown	Powys	Mid Wales	Biographical	website, social reformer Robert Owen
Regimental Museum of The Royal Welsh	Brecon	Powys	Mid Wales	Military	Uniforms, weapons, medal and artifacts of the South Wales Borderers (24th Foot) and the Welch Regiment (41st/69th Foot)
Thomas Shop Museum	Penybont	Powys	Mid Wales	History	website, 1805 period general store
Tretower Court	Crickhowell	Powys	Mid Wales	Historic house	Medieval unfurnished fortified manor house
W H Smith Museum	Newtown	Powys	Mid Wales	History	Original location of the W H Smith chain of booksellers, period shop
Nantgarw Chinaworks Museum	Nantgarw	Rhondda Cynon Taf	South Wales	Industry	History of Nantgarw Pottery
Rhondda Heritage Park	Trehafod	Rhondda Cynon Taf	South Wales	Mining	Former coal mine
1940s Swansea Bay	Swansea	Swansea	South Wales	Military	website, military and civilian homefront life in Swansea during World War II
Dylan Thomas Centre	Swansea	Swansea	South Wales	Biographical	Exhibits on author Dylan Thomas
Egypt Centre Museum of Egyptian Antiquities	Swansea	Swansea	South Wales	Archaeology	Part of Swansea University, Ancient Egyptian artifacts
Gower Heritage Centre	Parkmill	Swansea	South Wales	Open air	Includes 12th-century water powered corn and saw mill, restored woolen mill, outdoor exhibits of antique farming and cultivation, blacksmith, potter, farm
Glynn Vivian Art Gallery	Swansea	Swansea	South Wales	Art	Includes work by Old Masters, contemporary art, porcelain, Swansea china
Mission Gallery	Swansea	Swansea	South Wales	Art	Exhibitions of visual arts, applied arts and craft
National Waterfront Museum	Swansea	Swansea	South Wales	Multiple	(NMW) Welsh industrial and maritime heritage, social history, technology, science
Swansea Museum	Swansea	Swansea	South Wales	Multiple	Three main locations with exhibits on city history and culture, boats and maritime artifacts, street trams and memorabilia
Taliesin Arts Centre	Swansea	Swansea	South Wales	Art	Part of Swansea University, includes Oriel Ceri Richards Gallery
Big Pit National Coal Museum	Blaenafon	Torfaen	South Wales	Industry	(NMW), former coal mine, underground tour, equipment, buildings
Blaenavon Ironworks	Blaenafon	Torfaen	South Wales	Industry	Former iron works, remains of five early blast furnaces, restored late 18th-century workers' housing at Stack Square
Llantarnam Grange Arts Centre	Cwmbran	Torfaen	South Wales	Art	Exhibitions of applied and visual art
Pontypool Museum	Pontypool	Torfaen	South Wales	Local	Local history, art, domestic life, culture, Japanware and decorative arts
Art Central	Barry	Vale of Glamorgan	South Wales	Art	website, community art gallery in the old town hall
Cosmeston Medieval Village	Lavernock	Vale of Glamorgan	South Wales	Living	Recreated 14th-century peasant village
Cowbridge Museum	Cowbridge	Vale of Glamorgan	South Wales	Prison	information, located in Cowbridge Town Hall, early 19th-century prison, town hall and museum of local history
Fonmon Castle	Rhoose	Vale of Glamorgan	South Wales	Historic house	Medieval castle home and gardens
Nash Point Lighthouse	Nash Point	Vale of Glamorgan	South Wales	Maritime	Lighthouse tours
Oriel Washington Gallery	Penarth	Vale of Glamorgan	South Wales	Art	website, contemporary art gallery
Penarth Pier Pavilion	Penarth	Vale of Glamorgan	South Wales	Art	Hosts exhibits of art, photography and crafts
Turner House Gallery	Penarth	Vale of Glamorgan	South Wales	Art	Exhibition space for Ffotogallery, the national photography development agency for Wales, exhibits of photography, video, digital media
Bersham Colliery Mining Museum	Rhostyllen	Wrexham	North Wales	Industry	website, former coalfield with headgear, equipment, miner family life
Chirk Castle	Bersham	Wrexham	North Wales	Historic house	Operated by the National Trust, medieval fortress with state rooms, towers and dungeons, gardens
Erddig	Wrexham	Wrexham	North Wales	Historic house	Operated by the National Trust, early 18th-century country house reflecting the upstairs downstairs life of a gentry family over 250 years, outbuildings, garden, landscape park
Minera Lead Mines	Minera	Wrexham	North Wales	Industry	Former lead mine, equipment, miner family life
Nant Mill Visitor Centre	Wrexham	Wrexham	North Wales	Natural history	Located in a former corn mill in Nant Mill Country Park
Tŷ Pawb	Wrexham	Wrexham	North Wales	Art	website, formerly the Wrexham Arts Centre and Oriel Wrecsam
Xplore!	Wrexham	Wrexham	North Wales	Science	website, hands-on science exhibits, run by North Wales Science (formerly operated Techniquest Glyndŵr)
Wrexham County Borough Museum	Wrexham	Wrexham	North Wales	Local	website, local history, culture
The Wrexham Miners Project	Wrexham	Wrexham	North Wales	Local	website, mining history
Y Gaer	Brecon	Powys	Mid Wales	Multiple	Local history, culture, archaeology, rural life, art gallery

== Defunct museums ==
- Bersham Heritage Centre
- Cae Dai 50s Museum, Denbigh, website, destroyed by fire in 2009
- Celtica, Machynlleth, Powys
- Griffithstown Railway Museum, Pontypool, closed by owner in 2011
- Llanrwst Almshouse Museum, Llanrwst, closed in 2011
- Museum of Childhood Memories, Beaumaris
- Baked Bean Museum of Excellence, Port Talbot, closed by owner in 2023

== See also ==
- Conservation in the United Kingdom
