= Brynmawr rubber factory =

Factory in Monmouthshire, Wales

Coordinates: 51.795°N 3.176°W

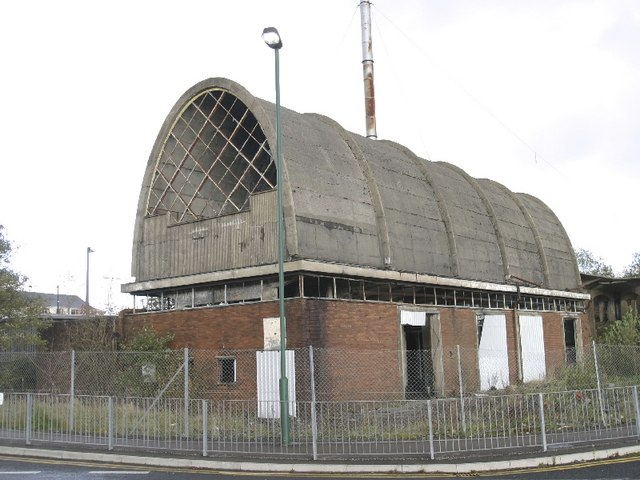
Vault of the surviving, and Grade II* listed, boiler house

The Brynmawr rubber factory is a now-demolished building which was situated in Brynmawr in Blaenau Gwent, Wales. It was designed and constructed between 1946 and 1952 by the Architects' Co-Partnership, a group of architecture alumni from the Architectural Association in London, in collaboration with engineer Ove Arup. Featuring a nine-domed concrete ceiling, the building was part of the "Festival of Britain period" in architecture and became the first post-war building to receive listed status, with a Grade-II* designation in 1986. Despite this status, the building was demolished in 2001 leaving only the boiler house intact, and the site is now occupied by housing and a superstore.

The building was commissioned by the industrialist Lord James Forrester for Enfield Cables, of which he was a director. Forrester had been part of the pre-war Brynmawr Experiment, which aimed to revive the town following the Great Depression. His desire for regeneration led to his decision to situate the factory in Brynmawr, despite it not being the best location commercially. Enfield Cables were not able to make the site economically viable after opening, and it was taken over by the Dunlop Rubber Company, operating under the brand name Dunlop Semtex. Dunlop Semtex achieved success with the factory, producing flooring for the health and education sectors, going on to buy the site in 1964. A downturn in fortunes in the late 1970s and early 1980s led to the factory's closure in 1981.

== Description ==
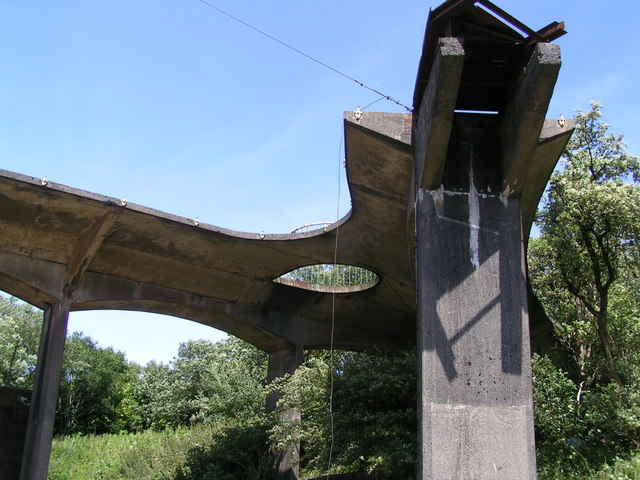
Concrete viaduct once bringing coal wagons directly into the boiler house

The Brynmawr rubber factory was located in the town of Brynmawr in Blaenau Gwent, Wales, to the south of the town centre and close to the A467 road. A reservoir was situated to the south of the site, with the factory's valve tower lying on its southern shore. The building was part of a post-war architectural trend known as the "Festival of Britain period" and was a Grade II* listed building. The building's engineer, Ove Arup, later worked on the Sydney Opera House, and the design of Brynmawr is credited as a partial inspiration for that project. The main working area was covered with a concrete roof consisting of nine domes, with circular windows providing light to the factory floor. A boiler house was constructed near the site, with an unusual spiral staircase, which was also listed. The boiler house of the Semtex factory still remains, albeit in a derelict condition.

== History ==
The Welsh Valleys, and Brynmawr in particular, suffered a major downturn during the Great Depression, as coal mines were closed as unprofitable, leaving around 80% of the town's workforce unemployed by the end of the 1930s. During this period the industrialist Lord James Forrester spent time in the town as part of the Brynmawr Experiment, a project run by the Quakers to promote small-scale industries. Forrester went on to become the Director of Enfield Cables in 1939. After the end of World War II in 1945, there was a significant increase in demand for rubber in the UK, and Enfield Cables began commissioning several new rubber factories across the country. Due to his connection to the town, and desire to rejuvenate its economy, Forrester decided to locate one of these in Brynmawr. This was despite the location not being the most commercially lucrative.

Forrester enlisted Ove Arup as engineer for the project, with Michael Powers as the architect. Powers had worked with Enfield Cables during the war, and had become a personal friend of Forrester's. Together with other young Architectural Association alumni, he had set up the Architects' Co-Partnership but had little commercial experience. Work began in 1947, but took five years to complete, with considerable logistical difficulties. The cost of the project's construction and lack of commercial viability, with the factory operating at only one-quarter capacity, caused Enfield Cables to withdraw financial support in May 1952. The Board of Trade was forced to step in, and in 1953 the factory was taken over by Semtex, which was a subsidiary of the Dunlop Rubber Company. Dunlop had a large demand for its rubber at the time, for use in flooring for the expanding health and education sectors. The factory became very successful, and Dunlop Semtex purchased the site in full in 1964.

Faced with increased competition and new innovations in flooring design, the factory began to decline in the late 1970s and early 1980s. The company appointed several different managers, hoping for an improvement, but these measures were unsuccessful. They began laying off staff in 1981, which led to a series of strikes by workers throughout the year culminating in a five-week sit-in by 350 staff in December. The management decided to close the factory in January 1982, declaring that the protesters had dismissed themselves and making all other staff redundant. Dunlop Semtex tried to sell the factory, but no potential buyers with sufficient finance emerged, and the site was put into receivership. With the exception of some small buildings which were rented to small businesses, the site was left empty. Despite being disused, the building was given a Grade II* listing in 1986, becoming the first post-war building in the country to receive listed status.

In 1995, an application was made to Blaenau Gwent council for a new development at the site, involving demolition of the main factory building. The national government decided not to intervene, despite the building's listed status, leaving the decision to the council. They authorised the demolition in 1996, despite objections from the Twentieth Century Society and Welsh Heritage, and alternative proposals including sports halls, cultural centres and a museum. Objections continued to be raised in the coming years, but eventually the demolition of the building went ahead in June 2001. After demolition, a number of four-bedroom homes were built on the site in the subsequent years as well as an Asda superstore development and associated leisure facilities. The boiler house of the Semtex factory remains intact, albeit in a derelict condition. In January 2015, the chimney joined to the boiler house was forced crashing down by strong winds, landing on a Western Power distribution centre and causing power cuts around the town.
