= Peter Scott (social entrepreneur) =

Peter Scott OBE (1890–1972) was an English Quaker activist and social entrepreneur. He is known particularly for the Brynmawr Experiment, a settlement in Wales.

== Life ==
He was the son of Peter Scott of Liverpool, a "confectioner and restaurant keeper", and his wife Mary Harriet Wycherley, daughter of C. Wycherley of Prescot, a grocer. The family adhered to the principles of the Plymouth Brethren, which he later rejected. He was educated privately and at the University of Liverpool School of Architecture. He did not complete the course. During World War I, Scott was in the Royal Field Artillery, serving in the Sinai and Palestine campaign and reaching the rank of captain.

In 1924 Scott joined the Birkenhead Meeting of the Society of Friends. There he worked with Malcolm Warner, of the Liverpool metal brokers French & Smith, on rehabilitation. He published an article on it, "Help for Discharged Prisoners", in The Friend in 1925. The proposal was based on communitarian ideas. Scott in 1926 became Assistant Secretary of the Home Service Committee (HSC, properly the Friends' Home Mission and Extension Committee, until 1927, now Quaker Life). He was also on the committee of the Maes yr Haf education settlement at Trealaw, in The Rhondda. Some of the funding there came through Thomas Jones, who also later supported Scott's work. Scott was Joint Secretary of the HSC from 1928 to 1934.

By the early 1930s Scott's communitarian ideas, applied to the problem of unemployment, were being recognised alongside Grith Fyrd and other settlement ideas by John Macmurray and Rolf Gardiner.

== Work at Brynmawr 1928–1934 ==
There was a Quaker group at Brynmawr from 1928, working on community reconstruction. The Quaker presence became an intentional community in October of that year when the Coalfields Distress Committee of the Society of Friends rented 31 Alma Terrace, Brynmawr for them. Scott's wife Lilian took charge of homemaking, helping, according to Margaret Pitt, "to make us into a happy family group".

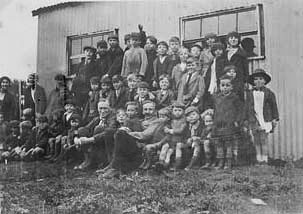
Pierre Cérésole and children at the 1931 Brynmawr workcamp

After Service Civil International (SCI) contacted Scott, a workcamp took place in Brynmawr, in 1931. It was backed also by the SCM, the Fellowship of Reconciliation and the Quaker Young Friends' Committee. The organisational work by Scott, Pierre Cérésole and Jean Philippe Inebnit led to the founding of the International Voluntary Service, as the British branch of SCI. Scott gained a significant associate when James Grimston came to Brynmawr; he was often known by his courtesy title Lord James Forrester, but in Wales went by Jim Forrester. He arrived first in 1931, staying in the SCI camp.

The furniture designer Paul Matt made his way to Brynmawr after hearing a talk by Joan Mary Fry. Scott first directed him to the making of wooden chicken coops. Matt in 1930 set up a furniture workshop, in the Gwalia Works, and began to scale up the business, later known as Brynmawr Furniture, with an order for Hubert Lidbetter chairs.

Graham Gordon Churchward (1905–1979), from a Quaker family, was in court in Leamington on a dozen false pretenses charges in 1927, and was released on probation, in the charge of Clifford Newton of Barclay Hall. He married in 1936 the teacher Dora May Gwynne of Brynmawr, and at that time was working for the Brynmawr and Clydach Valleys Industries Ltd. Manasseh describes him as a senior member of the sales staff at Brynmawr Furniture. Dora Churchyard, in a 1976 memoir, described how Scott clashed with Paul Matt, as Pitt in her book Unemployed People described how he interacted with Joan Mary Fry.

Hilda Jennings was a member of the Coalfields Distress Committee. She came to Brynmawr as a voluntary researcher; Scott managed to finance a community survey by her, with support including money from the University College of South Wales. She went on to write two related books. The couple (Charles) Donald Wilson and Enid L. M. Wilson née Bowler, married in 1925, came to Brynmawr with their family in 1934, Enid being a personal friend of Lilian Scott. Donald Wilson was later Organizing Secretary of The Peckham Experiment.

== Subsistence Production Schemes 1934–1939 ==
From the point of view of the Society of Friends, the 1928 Brynmawr initiative was part of its "Seeds Scheme", which came to have an emphasis, as the Great Depression overtook the British economy, on allotments and setting the unemployed to work on them. One aspect of the scheme was Subsistence Production, emphasising an economic model where barter could take the place of cash transactions. Scott in 1934 made a major revision of his efforts, concentrating on Subsistence Production Schemes (SPS), the first of which he had set up in 1929 at Brynmawr. In general, the Land Settlement Association set up that year did not adopt the same model. He took steps to involve Lord James Forrester, who by 1936 was spending two-thirds of his time as Welsh Area SPS Organiser.

Organizational chart of the structure of "An Order of friends", from their Annual Report 1937

Scott also set up a holding and fundraising organisation of his own, "An Order of friends", which despite its name was not linked to the Quakers. During 1934, he gained the attention of Robert Spear Hudson in the Ministry of Labour, who wished to see Scott scale up his current scheme at Brynmawr, to five communities. Government money was offered as support, as an initiative to tackle unemployment. Scott demurred, limiting the projects to two, and judging that government support might deter participation. There did result an introduction to Lord Nuffield, who promised £30,000. Scott spoke in November of that year to the Liverpool Echo about further backers for his Up Holland project, including Lord Derby, Lord Leverhulme, and John Shute.

In an announcement by special commissioner Percy Malcolm Stewart in January 1935, further money was announced for Subsistence Production Schemes. The Duchess of York visited the project in the Wigan area in July 1935. Four new centres were Ashfield House, Billinge, Parbold Hall and Pemberton. The whole Wigan scheme closed in 1938.

Henry Ecroyd, an accountant who on graduating around 1929 worked for the philanthropist Charles Herbert Grinling, joined Scott at his Hereford "headquarters" in 1936, and found he had something in common with Grinling, in terms of ideals.

=== Marie Jahoda report ===
Marie Jahoda through Alexander Farquharson was involved in a South Wales survey for Scott. This study by Jahoda of a Monmouthshire SPS was published only in 1987.

The report covered the Eastern Valley of Monmouthshire—including the urban areas of Blaenavon, Caerleon, Cwmbran and Pontypool—and the SPS set up at the village of Cwmavon, in the period 1937–8. Jahoda was resident in the area. In 1987 she wrote that it "showed the gap between the idealistic conception of the SPS and the reality of its functioning." Forrester had objections, stating that the report "destroyed his life's work." Beholden to Forrester who had visited her family in Vienna, Jahoda held back its publication. The Pilgrim Trust study Men Without Work from 1938 made an opaque allusion to Jahoda's work; Jahoda herself made a concise version available in 1942.

=== Final years and aftermath ===
Pierse Loftus spoke favourably about the Brynmawr experiment in a House of Commons debate on unemployment on 22 December 1938. "Talwrn" (Harold Tudor) wrote in the Liverpool Echo on 26 July 1939 about the report of the "Order of friends", Scott's vehicle, and commented that Brynmawr furniture was now well-known. The Subsistence Production Schemes came to an end in 1939. One at Cwmavon, Torfaen had been in the former Westlake Brewery. It "provided work in food production, clothing and agriculture", to 1939. One of the buildings was then repurposed to house the school of Minna Specht.

Forrester and Scott discussed further steps with Eric Anthony Ambrose Rowse of the Architectural Association School of Architecture. There resulted the Association for Planning and Regional Reconstruction, in which Forrester was involved. Scott took a position as Rural Land Agent.

== Palestine ==
Scott visited Palestine in 1937, where he associated with Heinz Kappes (de:Heinz Kappes). His published comments on the political situation there were criticised by Mary Pumphrey of the Ramallah Friends School, as too favourable to the British colonial administration.

== Court Perrott ==
In 1942 Scott was nominated to the Wales Survey Board when it was set up, becoming its secretary with Sir Percy Watkins as chairman. His address was then given as Court Perrott, Llandegveth. It was a dairy farm of 247 acres (100 ha), put up for sale by The Subsistence Production Properties Ltd. in 1940. At a joint conference of the Board and the Town and Country Planning Association in 1942, Scott gave a paper covering a plan for rural Wales. He also took on a part-time post as Rural Land Utilisation Officer for Wales for the Ministry of Agriculture. In the wake of the report "Land Utilisation in Rural Areas" by a committee chaired by Leslie Scott, these ten Officers under Dudley Stamp in practice supported planning in line with the report's findings. The Court Perrott address was that of the Survey Council of Wales.

== Post-War ==
In 1948 Scott was awarded the Order of the British Empire. His citation in the New Year's Honours was as Rural Land Use Utilisation Officer for Wales, Ministry of Agriculture and Fisheries. He then proposed a project in which

[...] the intention was to introduce a new experiment in land utilisation by taking over a large unit of land which would be divided into departments or sections which could be economically worked with modern equipment, in regard to size and its relation to other departments. The whole area would form a complete settlement within which there would be agricultural and some related industrial development, and attention would be paid to social amenities, etc. The whole scheme would be controlled by a non-profit-making company limited by guarantee.

A subsequent project took place on the Bodorgan Hall estate of Sir George Llewelyn Tapps-Gervis-Meyrick, 5th Baronet, on Anglesey. It centred on the disused airfield that had been RAF Bodorgan. Land to the extent of more than 1,000 acres (400 ha) was leased to the Ministry of Agriculture, Fisheries and Food, for a project led by Scott. It was named after a former chapel to St Meirian at Bordorgan, Llanfeirian in the Welsh form of parish name, anglicised as the Llanverian Experiment. The Western Mail reported on 12 October 1951 that

Last night the complete [Court Perrott Farm], owned by Mr. Peter Scott, including the livestock, farm implements, furniture, motor cars, and farm personnel, was moved in a special British Railways train, made up of 18 trucks and one passenger coach.[...] the work of the farm continued at Bodorgan this morning.

Sir Thomas Dugdale in 1953 gave a parliamentary answer in the House of Commons to Cledwyn Hughes on the project's funding, stating that "the experiment has been financed by loans from the Development Fund amounting in all to £143,700. The initial stages have been largely concerned with equipping, stocking and cultivations, including reclamation work [...]". Hughes mentioned Scott in 1954 in a debate on Welsh Affairs, in connection with an industrial survey for Anglesey.

The Llanverian project was wound up in 1965.

== Family ==
Scott married firstly, in 1925, Lilian Dove (died 1935, aged 47). After her death in a car accident, he married secondly, in 1938, the historian Richenda Payne. In later life his address was Tre Anna, Dwyran, Anglesey.

Richenda Clara Payne (1903–1984) was the daughter of William Payne of Hitchin. In 1930 she was engaged to Reginald Reynolds. In December 1938 he married Ethel Mannin as her second husband.

Peter and Richenda Scott were both tutors for the summer term 1939 at Pendle Hill Quaker Center, Wallingford, Pennsylvania. Peter presented on the topic of "The Human Factor in Social Change". This was an academic project on which he was engaged, with Eduard C. Lindeman who was also there, and Lewis Bean of the Department of Agriculture.
