= Durham Students' Union =

Representative body for students at Durham University

Coordinates: 54°46′24″N 1°34′18″W

- Institution: Durham University
- Location: Dunelm House, Durham, United Kingdom
- Established: 1899 as Durham Colleges Students' Representative Council
- Sabbatical officers: President: Callum Hendry; Education Officer: Mia Bradshaw; Communities Officer: Alex Evans
- Affiliations: National Union of Students,
- Website: Durham SU

Durham Students' Union, operating as Durham SU, is the students' union of Durham University in Durham, England. It is an organisation, originally set up as the Durham Colleges Students’ Representative Council in 1899 and renamed in 1969, with the intention of representing and providing welfare and services for the students of the University of Durham.

== Location ==
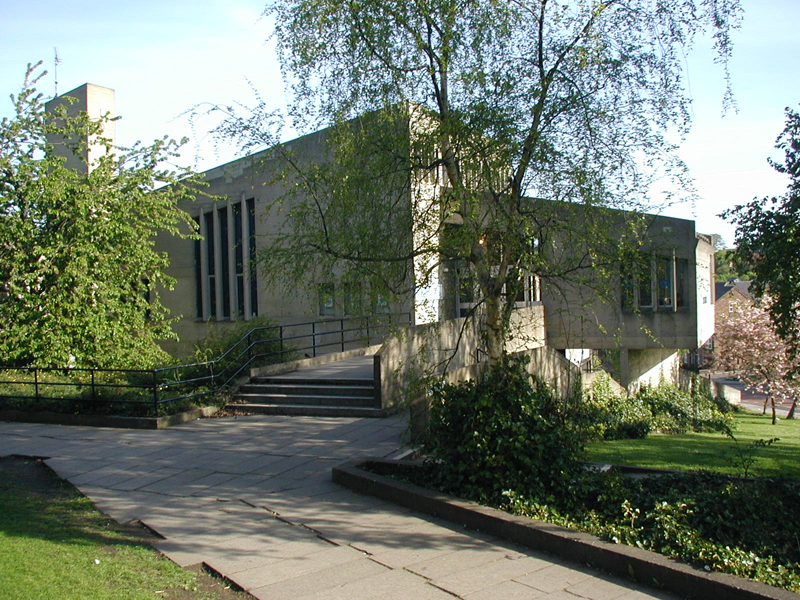
Durham Students' Union's building, Dunelm House

The Students' Union occupies and manages Dunelm House, a university-owned building in the centre of Durham where a wide variety of student activities take place. Designed by the Architects' Co-Partnership, the Brutalist, angular concrete building was completed in 1966 under the supervision of architect Sir Ove Arup, whose Kingsgate Bridge, adjacent, opened two years earlier. Built into the steeply sloping bank of the River Wear, Dunelm House is notable internally for the fact that the main staircase linking all five levels of the building runs in an entirely straight line. This was intended by the building's architects to create the feeling of an interior street.

In 1968 Dunelm House won a Civic Trust award, and a RIBA award in 1987, though it has been described by students as "The ugliest building in Durham". On the other hand, Sir Nikolaus Pevsner, the noted architecture historian, considered the building, "Brutalist by tradition but not brutal to the landscape ... the elements, though bold, [are] sensitively composed." Durham City Council's Local Plan notes that the "powerful" building, together with Kingsgate Bridge, "provides an exhilarating pedestrian route ... out into open space over the river gorge". Following a four-year campaign by the Twentieth Century Society, the building was listed at Grade II in 2021 as "the foremost students’ union building of the post-war era in England".

== Structure and decision making ==
Durham SU is a registered charity. The Student's Union is run by full-time sabbatical student officers, part-time officers, a board of trustee's and a student assembly.

The full-time sabbatical student officers are elected by Durham Student's Union membership and they lead the political direction of the Union. For the 2026/7 Academic year, the sabbatical student officers are:

- President, Callum Hendry
- Education Officer, Mia Bradshaw
- Communities Officer, Alex Evans

Starting in the 2024 academic year, the 3 full-time sabbatical officers will be supported by 12 part-time student officers, the part-time officers are:

- One Faculty President for each Faculty of Durham University, Scarlett Tan (Arts and Humanities), Ojashwi Kharel (Business), Benjamin Reeves (Science), Samara Sakhrani (Social Sciences and Health)
- The International Students Officer, Chunmiao Liu
- The Postgraduate Research Students Officer, Amy Doyle
- The Postgraduate Taught Students Officer,
- The Societies Officer, Siya Chadha
- The Welfare Officer, Evia Graff
- The Liberation Officer, Megan Leah Portz
- One member of JCR Presidents Committee,
- One member of MCR Presidents Committee,

The students' union president and a postgraduate student nominated by the students' union sit on the Council of Durham University, the governing body of the university.

The full-time and part-time officers are organised into the officer committee and the following sub-committees:

- Education Committee - chaired by the Education Officer and focusing on the academic experience.
- Communities Committee - chaired by the Communities Officer, focusing on improving the aspects of the non-academic experience.

The board of trustees is the governing body of the Union, it ensures it continues to meet its aims and operates within to boundaries of charity law. The board of trustees consists of 4 lay trustees, the 3 sabbatical student officers, and an additional 4 elected student trustees.

Assembly holds the sabbatical student officers to account, and also helps to shape the policy of the Union. Assembly consists of student officers, representatives of Junior Common Rooms from each Durham College, and representatives from Durham SU associations.

Durham SU is also supported by a team of paid staff.

== Services ==
The Durham SU acts an umbrella organisation for approximately 300 student clubs and organisations, which span academic, arts, culture and faith, hobbies and games, outdoors, politics, law and music interests. It also acts as am umbrella organisation for eight 'associations', which exist to allow for those who self-define into any of the associations to campaign on issues that effect their student experience, as well as to provide them with a safe space to discuss their problems.

DurhamSU also provides room booking services at Dunelm House, used by both student groups, external groups, and the wider university. It also organises the Fresher's Fair at the start of the academic year and runs campaigns and lobbies for student interests with the university and wider community. Kingsgate Bar and Café was closed for the 2024 academic year due to monetary issues.

DUCK (Durham University Charities Committee) is the fundraising arm of the DSU charitable organisation. DUCK runs events on a university and college level, including expeditions (fundraising to travel abroad), challenges (extreme events), endurance challenges, RAG raids (mass fundraising on city streets) and general events.

== Relation to colleges ==
Durham University is a collegiate university and therefore the role of the central students' union is different from most other universities. Each of Durham's colleges has its own student representative body, known in most colleges as the Junior Common Room, which provides services and organises events within the college; while many decisions within the central Students' Union are made with the involvement of JCR SU Representatives. However, some of the JCRs have opted to disaffiliate from the students' union - including University College and Hild Bede - following the controversial 2020 officer and trustee elections.

== Controversies ==
=== NUS Affiliation ===
On a number of occasions, some have suggested have that Durham SU might disaffiliate from the NUS, however until 2009 none of those opposed to affiliation had pushed the issue to a full student debate and vote. In 2009 however, a referendum took place proposing that Durham SU should stay affiliated to the NUS. Students voted convincingly in favour of affiliation with 80% (2564) of students who voted voting to stay affiliated and 20% (624) voting to disaffiliate.

Shortly after this, controversy arose regarding a planned debate, "Multiculturalism in Britain", at the Durham Union Society, which was to involve a recently elected BNP MEP, and which was subsequently cancelled over alleged fears for student safety, reopened the issue of NUS affiliation. A petition for a second referendum was put before the Union and on 12 March 2010, the referendum concluded with a majority of voting students voting to disaffiliate from the NUS, meaning that Durham Students' Union disaffiliated from the NUS after the end of the 2009-2010 academic year.

A third referendum on NUS affiliation was held in January 2011 with 60% of students voting to reaffiliate with NUS.

In 2015, another referendum reaffirmed NUS affiliation (61% supported affiliation), with an 11% voter turnout. The SU currently remains affiliated with the NUS.

=== 2020 sabbatical student officer elections ===
In 2020, there was a controversy surrounding the results of the 2020 election, with 58% of votes for Re-Open Nominations being cast aside as a result of alleged rule breaches by the Re-Open Nominations campaign. The Re-Open Nominations campaign faced accusations of racism and after the election has been cited as the cause of a spike in racist online abuse. Several college Common Rooms have chosen to 'disaffiliate', 'disassociate' or 'disengage' from the Students Union citing the decision to dismiss Re-Open Nominations.

This led to Durham SU to conduct a democracy review, with the aim of reviewing the unions democracy processes and to suggest improvements. Multiple issues were identified, including the need for better communication and a less binary voting system.

=== Palatinate Independence Debate ===
In 2022, Durham university's student newspaper Palatinate's editorial board voted 97% in favour of becoming an independent newspaper, and leaving Durham Students Union.

The call for independence was supported by multiple former editors at Palatinate, including Jeremy Vine. The Mail on Sunday also promised to provide palatinate £20,000 to help 'secure their independence' whilst claiming this would not effect their 'editorial independence'. Whilst Palatinate claimed they had not accepted or rejected the money, Jack Ballingham, opportunities officer at the time, called the push for independence 'unprovoked' and claimed Palatinate went to the Daily Mail for 'extra firepower' against Durham SU.

== Notable former officers ==
A number of notable figures have been involved in Durham Students' Union in the past. These include:

- Andrew McFarlane (judge), former President
- Michael Izza, former President
- Mo Mowlam, former Deputy President (Education and Welfare)
- Jeremy Vine, former Editor of Palatinate
- George Alagiah, former Editor of Palatinate

== Former Presidents ==
This list includes all presidents of the Durham Students' Union since being re-named in 1969/70.

- 1970-71 Richard J. Ayre, University
- 1971-72 Michael Eccles, St Cuthbert's
- 1972-73 Patrick Wolfe, St Chad's
- 1973-74 John Spens, Collingwood
- 1974-75 Adrian Dorber, St John's
- 1975-76 Andrew McFarlane, Collingwood
- 1976-77 John McGahan, University
- 1977-78 David J. Smith, Ushaw
- 1978-79 A.C. Jenkins, Van Mildert
- 1979-80 S.P.S. Weatherseed, St Cuthbert's
- 1980-81 Peter G. Gray, University
- 1981-82 Robert J. Beckley, University
- 1982-83 Michael D.M. Izza, St Cuthbert's
- 1983-84 Jacqui Mellor, Trevelyan
- 1984-85 Simon Pottinger, University
- 1985-86 Patrick J. Martin, Collingwood
- 1986-87 Katherine M. Ross, Van Mildert
- 1987-88 Nicholas V. Thorne, Grey
- 1988-89 Graeme N. Rainey, Van Mildert
- 1989-90 Jonathan S. Rich, Hild Bede
- 1990-91 Aidan W.G. Poole, St Aidan's
- 1991-92 Robert W. Groves, St John's
- 1992-93 Daniel Redford, St Cuthbert's
- 1993-94 Jon Walsh, Van Mildert
- 1994-95 Richard Taylor, Van Mildert
- 1995-96 Emily Baldock, Van Mildert
- 1996-97 Ewan Jenkins, St Cuthbert's
- 1997-98 Charlotte Nash-Wanklin, Collingwood
- 1998-99 Brian Ahearne, Hatfield
- 1999-00 Dave Park, Trevelyan
- 2000-01 Eddie Moore, Grey
- 2001-02 Emily Fieran-Reed, St Mary's
- 2002-03 Ben Wood
- 2003-04 Craig Jones
- 2004-05 Tom Page
- 2005-06 Nick Pickles
- 2006-07 Alex Duncan
- 2007-08 Flo Herbert, Van Mildert
- 2008-09 Andrew Welch, Van Mildert
- 2009-10 Natalie Crisp, Grey
- 2010-11 Samuel Roseveare, Van Mildert
- 2011-12 Mike King
- 2012-13 Archie Dallas
- 2013-15 Dan Slavin, Stephenson
- 2015-16 Millie Tanner, St Cuthbert's
- 2016-17 Alice Dee, St Aidan's
- 2017-18 Megan Croll, St Cuthbert's
- 2018-19 George Walker, Van Mildert
- 2019-20 Kate McIntosh, St Cuthbert's
- 2020-22 Seun Twins, Hild Bede
- 2022-23 Joe McGarry, St Aidan's
- 2023-25 Dan Lonsdale, Trevelyan
- 2025-26 Abi Taylor, St Mary's
