= James Grimston, 5th Earl of Verulam =

British peer and businessman

James Brabazon Grimston, 5th Earl of Verulam (11 October 1910 – 13 October 1960) was a British peer and businessman.

== Early life and education ==
Verulam was the eldest son of James Grimston, 4th Earl of Verulam, and Lady Violet Brabazon, younger daughter of the 12th Earl of Meath. He was educated at Eton and Christ Church, Oxford. He succeeded to the earldom upon the death of his father in 1949.

== Brynmawr ==
At the age of 19, whilst studying at Oxford, Verulam first went to Brynmawr, Wales on an international work camp. Brynmawr had suffered from high unemployment due to the closure of local coal mines in the 1920s and a Quaker initiative known as the Brynmawr Experiment had been set up to help find unemployed local people a livelihood.

In 1934, Peter Scott, previously the instigator of the Quaker work in Brynmawr, decided to set up a Subsistence Production Society (SPS) in the area, and Verulam was appointed as the Area Organiser, where he was known as Jim Forrester, the surname being derived from his family courtesy title Lord Forrester.

The SPS consisted of farms, a bakery and other facilities where members could obtain food and products they wanted in return for work. In 1939, due to preparations for war providing work for local unemployed people, the SPS collapsed.

After the end of the Second World War, Verulam continued to try to work in Brynmawr by establishing a model rubber factory.

== Career ==
Verulam's first job was in Austria after which he was managing director of Enfield Zinc Products. In 1949 he became chairman of Enfield Rolling Mills.

He was mayor of St Albans in 1956; and president of the Cremation Society from 1955 to 1958. He was also a director of the District Bank and sat on various committees concerned with health, welfare and disability.

== Death ==
Verulam died in October 1960 at the age of 50. He was unmarried and was succeeded in the earldom and other titles by his younger brother, John.

Peerage of the United Kingdom
| Preceded by James Grimston | Earl of Verulam; 1949–1960 | Succeeded by John Grimston |
