= London Churchill College =

Educational institution in London, England

Coordinates: 51°32′32″N 0°01′57″E

- Logo
- Type: Independent higher education college
- Established: 2006
- Principal: Nick Pape
- Location: London, England
- Campus: Urban
- Website: lcc.ac.uk

London Churchill College is an independent higher education college in London, England. It was registered in England and Wales in 2006.

Its current Principal is Nick Papé. It is a member of Independent Higher Education.

== Courses and rankings ==
As of 2024, the college offers two Higher National Diploma qualifications:

- Business (Entrepreneurship and Small Business Management)
- Hospitality Management (General Pathway)

It does not currently hold a Teaching Excellence Framework award.

Some courses were offered in partnership with the University of Bedfordshire from 2015.

=== Quality Assurance Agency criticism ===
The college was assessed by the Quality Assurance Agency in 2019. Its report produced three key concerns:

- Insufficient student support
- Poor attendance monitoring
- Poor academic standards for work placements

== Campus and buildings ==
The college's main campus is located in the Forest Gate area of the London Borough of Newham. It is based in Barclay Hall.

In 2019 it acquired an additional campus, King's House, in Barking. It will specialise in delivering the HND Health and Social Care.
