= Hilda Jennings =

British social worker, community activist and author (1894–1978)

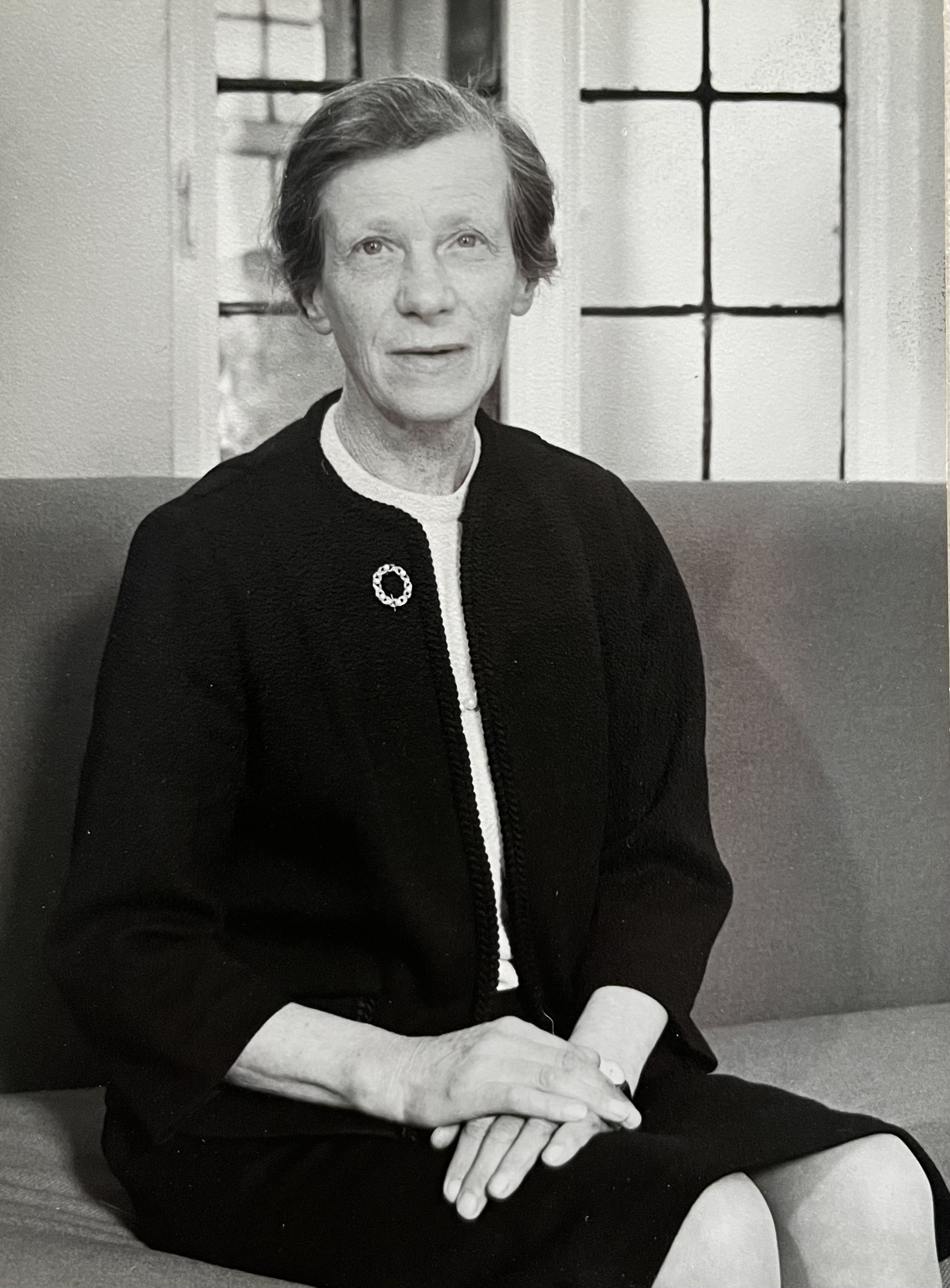
- Born: 7 February 1894; Stafford, England
- Died: 1978 (aged 83–84)
- Education: Stafford Girls' High School; St Hilda's College, Oxford (BA); London School of Economics (MA)
- Parents: Arthur Jennings (father); Anne Madders (mother)
- Relatives: Charles Venables (brother-in-law)

Hilda Jennings (1894–1978) was a British community activist, sociologist, author, and academic. She is best known for her efforts to improve the lives of working-class communities, particularly through her work in the East End of London, at the Bryn Mawr Community, and as Warden of the Barton Hill University Settlement.

== Background ==
Hilda Jennings was born into a Stafford family established in commerce. The family firm, R.T. Jennings & Son of Stafford, dated back to the 19th century and was, at its height, the largest local footwear manufacturer and wholesaler. In 1959, the business was restructured as Jen Shoes Ltd. Her father, Arthur Thomas Jennings JP (d. 1926), was a prominent businessman who owned the company until it was incorporated as a limited company in 1922. He also served as a director of the Stafford Railway Building Society.

The Jennings children enjoyed a comfortable and privileged upbringing, reflective of their family's social standing and commercial success. Both of Hilda's siblings went on to lead successful lives: her brother, Arthur Tildesley Jennings, joined the family business and later became its managing director, while her sister, Nellie Jennings, married Charles Venables, a wealthy industrialist and timber merchant from an industrial Quaker family, similar in status to their own.

Jennings' mother was Anne Madders, who married Arthur Thomas Jennings in 1892. She was from a Staffordshire farming family, then based at Seighford Grange. Her father John Madders later moved to farm at Coppenhall, dying shortly afterwards, where two of Anne's brothers carried on the farm.

== Education ==
Hilda Jennings attended Stafford Girls' High School and won an open scholarship in 1912 to attend St Hilda's Hall, Oxford. From there she went on to study at the London School of Economics, gaining a Master's degree in Social Science. She graduated at Oxford in 1920.

== Career ==
After leaving education, Jennnings first employment was as a school attendance officer in the East End of London. Charged with the vital role of ensuring children had full access to their entitlement to education, she navigated the difficulties it presented to their parents who relied on them to work. This led onto her role as Secretary to the Children's Country Holiday Fund, where she organised for boys from the East End to holiday in the Staffordshire countryside.

Jennings took her skills to Brynmawr in South Wales in 1929. In research conducted whilst working on Peter Soctt's Quaker Brynmawr Experiment, she compiled her next title, Brynmawr: A study of a distressed area, in which she challenged the basis for economic power that created mass unemployment, namely the division between owners and wage-earners. She concluded that the future of Brynmawr should be multifaceted, and no longer overreliant on employment in the coal industry.

On becoming the Warden at the University Settlement in 1934 at Barton Hill, Bristol, Jennings held this position for twenty years. She was subsequently its Director of Research. With her arrival, sporadic social work training at the settlement became well established.

In 1939 Jennings, assited by Winifred Gill, was asked by Robert Silvey of BBC Radio's audience research department to conduct a local survey of working class listening tendencies. They found a particular benefit in the regular series of programmes on child care and maternal health pioneered by Margery Wace. After the outbreak of World War II, in December 1939, the BBC moved its continuous survey of listening from London to Bristol, with Silvey's department.

Jennings was known for encouraging people in the Bristol region while the area was being redeveloped in the 1950s and 1960s. During this time, she employed Priscilla Reuel Tolkien as her secretary. Jennings, having seen Tolkien’s growing interest, "gave her jobs beyond the scope of secutarial work to broaden her experience." This prompted Tolkiens study of Social Sciences at the London School of Economics, one of Jennings' own alama mater.

In her 1962 book Societies in the Making, Jennings describes Barton Hill in Bristol and examines how the community decided to rebuild in the same area.

== Personal life ==
Jennings was a keen and accoumplished poet, with a particaular love of and focus on nature, inspired by her upbringing in rural Stafforshire. During her time at Oxford, she was a regular contributor to The Fritillary Magazine of Lady Margaret Hall.

When based in Bristol at the University Settlement, she volunteered as an Air Raid Warden during the Second World War.

Following the Anschluss, fellow academic and Warden of the Verein Wiener Settlement Else Federn came to live and work with Jennings as a volunteer at the Britsol Settlement. Federn maintained contacts with other refugees and sought entry permits for them. Through this relationship, Hilda Jennings arranged for two children, Hans and Suse Weber, to come from Vienna on the Kindertransport to live in Stafford with her sibilings families.

Hilda retired to Staffordshire, where she lived on the estate of her sister and brother-in-law, Nellie and Charles Venables, spending these latter years reflecting on her life and writing her final academic work, Societies in the Making, published in 1962. She rekindled her love of writing poetry whilst in retirement. In an obituary in the Western Daily Press, Sir John Partridge, Chairman of Imperial Tobacco, paid tribute to Jennings in an article with the headline Secret Poet. A friend of Jennings, he described her as a "dedicated social worker", who fought poverty and distress in East Bristol. Sir John revealed that only after her death a collection of her poems had been found, and they were subsequently published. She died on the 29th June 1978 on her sisters estate in Stafford.

== Legacy ==
In 2025, the Barton Hill History Group, led a project called 'Women That Made Barton Hill' and subsequently published a biography of Jennings' life entitled "Hilda Jennings. An Advocate For The Disadvantaged" by Garry Atterton in collaboration with Joy Searle and Maddie Janes (Jennings' niece).

Additionally in 2026, Jennings had a plaque dedicated to her and installed at Barton Hill in recognition of her work in Bristol. It notes that she was a "Social Reformer with Immense Heart".

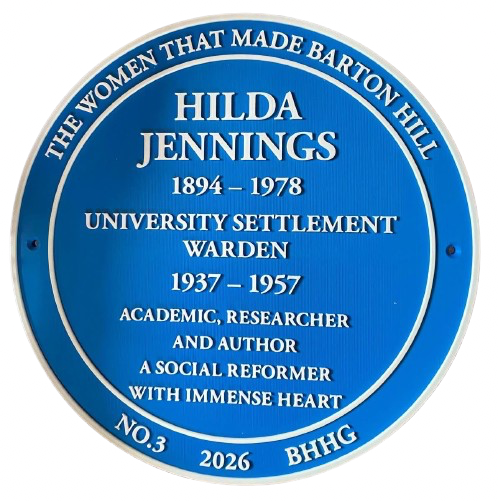

== Selected publications ==
- Jennings, Hilda (1930). The private citizen in public social work. London: G. Allen & Unwin Ltd. OCLC 7098912.
- Jennings, Hilda; Brynmawr community study council (1934). Brynmawr; a study of a distressed area, based on the results of the social survey carried out by the Brynmawr community study council. London: Allenson & Co. OCLC 3058804.
- Jennings, Hilda; Gill, Winifred (1939). Broadcasting in everyday life: a survey of the social effects of the coming of broadcasting. British Broadcasting Corporation. OCLC 224036420
- Jennings, Hilda (1973). Sixty years of change, 1911–1971. Bristol: University Settlement Bristol Community Association. ISBN 0-9502865-0-8.
- Jennings, Hilda (1962). Societies in the making: a study of development and redevelopment within a county borough. London: Routledge. ISBN 978-1-135-03449-8.
