= Dunelm House =

Brutalist university building in Durham, England

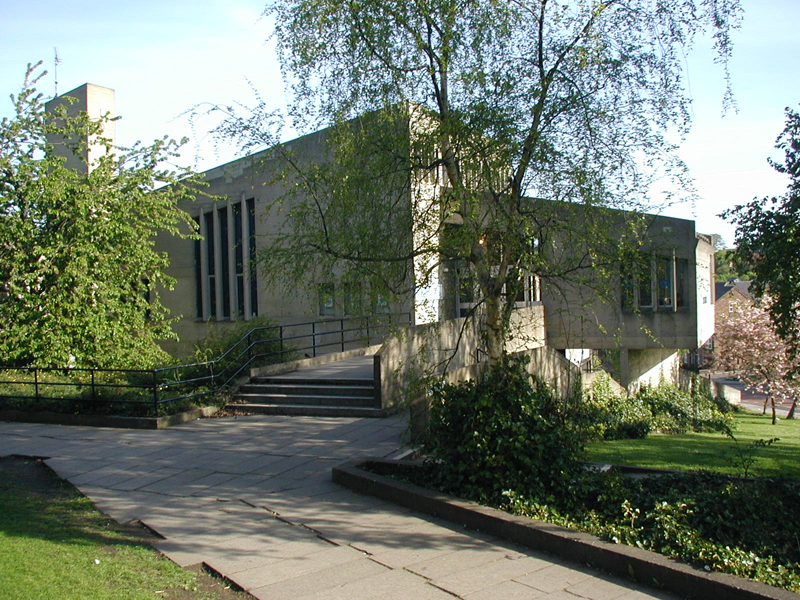
- The top level entrance of the building
- Interactive map of the Dunelm House area

General information
- Type: University building
- Architectural style: Brutalism
- Coordinates: 54°46′24″N 1°34′18″W
- Completed: 1966

Technical details
- Floor count: 6

Listed Building – Grade II
- Official name: Dunelm House including landing stage, steps and attached walls
- Designated: 9 July 2021
- Reference no.: 1477064

Dunelm House is a Grade II listed building in Durham, England, built in 1966 in the brutalist style. It belongs to Durham University and houses Durham Students' Union. Its listing entry cites, among other factors, that it is "a significant Brutalist building that reflects the latest in architectural thinking for its date" and that it is "the foremost students’ union building of the post-war era in England".

== History ==
=== Construction ===
The brutalist angular concrete building was designed by Richard Raines and Michael Powers of the Architects' Co-Partnership, and completed in 1966 under the supervision of engineer Sir Ove Arup, whose adjacent Kingsgate Bridge opened two years earlier. Built into the steeply sloping bank of the River Wear, Dunelm House is notable internally for the fact that the main staircase linking all five levels of the building runs in an entirely straight line. This was intended by the building's architects to create the feeling of an interior street.

=== Music venue ===
The building was opened in 1966 with a concert by the Thelonious Monk quartet.

During the 1960s and 70s, the venue was part of the national music circuit, and hosted bands including Pink Floyd and Procol Harum. After one gig in 1969, members of Free wrote the song All Right Now in their dressing room in the building, which went on to be their biggest hit.

=== Uncertain future and eventual listing ===
In 2016, the university applied for a Certificate of Immunity from Listing, and revealed plans to demolish the building as part of their estate masterplan, saying it would cost £15 million to make the building fit for purpose. Historic England suggested that Dunelm House should be made a Grade II listed building, but culture secretary Karen Bradley said she was inclined instead to grant the certificate of immunity, allowing the building to be demolished.

In 2017, the building hosted a conference under the title "Caring for Brutalism", sponsored by the university and the Twentieth Century Society, which brought together experts on brutalist architecture to discuss the significance and future of Dunelm House and similar 20th century buildings.

The Secretary of State's initial decision to grant a certificate of immunity was appealed by the Twentieth Century Society. The initial appeal was unsuccessful but a second appeal on the grounds that there were irregularities in the listing process and evidence that the decision had been wrongly made led to an announcement in 2021 that the building would be listed at Grade II. This was reported in both local and national press.

== Reception ==
In 1968 Dunelm House won a Civic Trust award. Sir Nikolaus Pevsner, the noted architecture historian, considered the building, "Brutalist by tradition but not brutal to the landscape ... the elements, though bold, [are] sensitively composed." Durham City Council's Local Plan notes that the "powerful" building, together with Kingsgate Bridge, "provides an exhilarating pedestrian route ... out into open space over the river gorge". Douglas Wise, head of the school of architecture at Newcastle University, called it "the greatest contribution modern architecture has made to the enjoyment of an English medieval city". It has also been recognised for the way its multiple levels cascade down the river bank, reflecting the vernacular architecture of the city and breaking up the bulk of the building.

Public views were divided from the start, with a local newspaper in 1966 reporting views ranging from "the third best looking building in the city" (after the cathedral and castle), to a "monstrosity". The Observer in 2017 reported that students called it "that ugly concrete building". It also faces consistent ridicule from university students.
