= Charles Venables =

British Industrialist and Timber Merchant

Charles J. Venables OBE
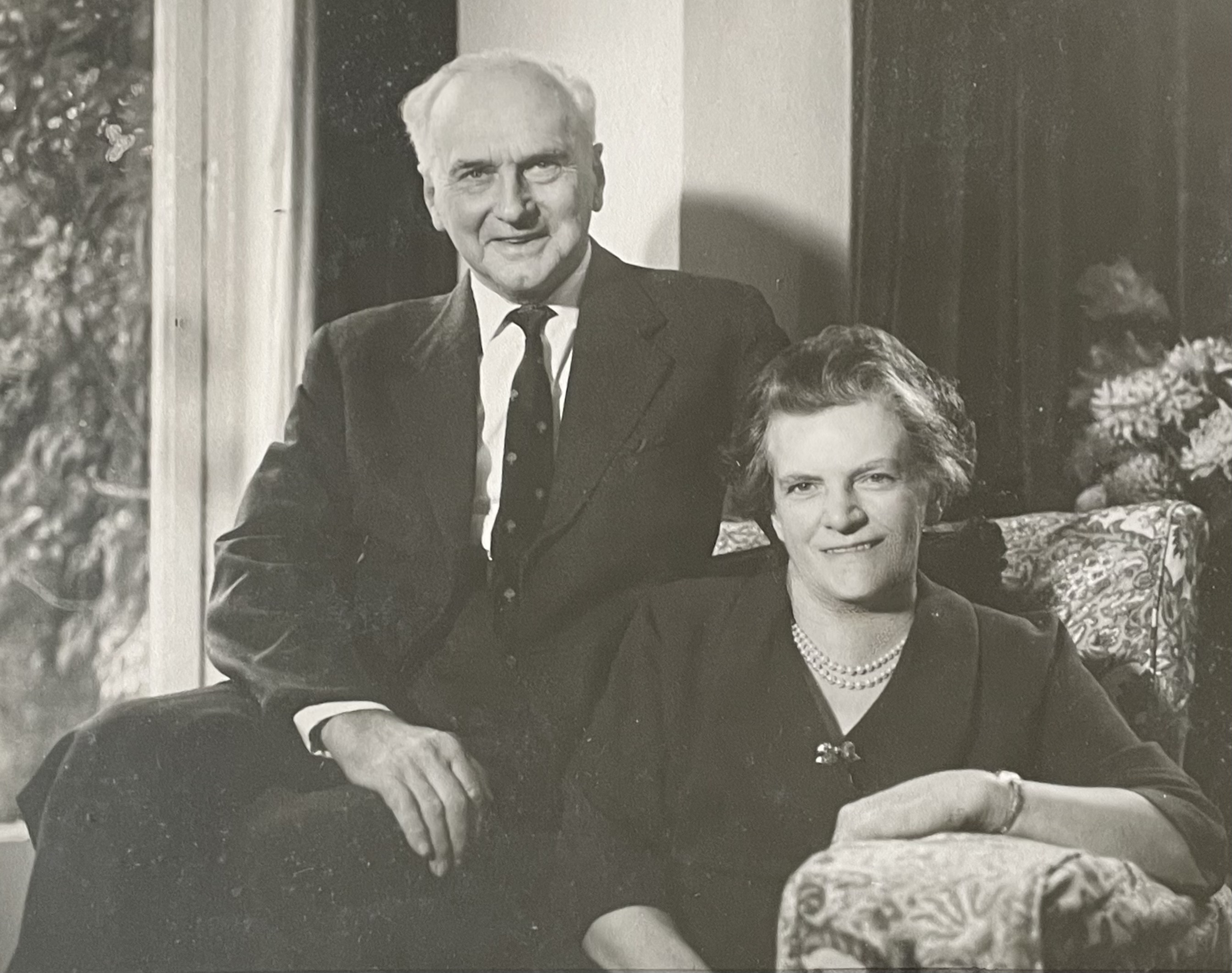
- Born: 6 March 1898; Stafford, England
- Died: 1989 (aged 90–91)
- Occupations: Timber merchant, Industrialist, Managing Director
- Known for: Services to forestry
- Title: President of the Royal Forestry Society
- Term: 1968–1970
- Predecessor: The Duke of Abercorn
- Successor: R. Hamersley MVO JP FRICS
- Spouse: Nellie Jennings (m. 1927)
- Children: 5
- Parent(s): Henry Venables II and Ellen Jackson
- Relatives: Hilda Jennings (sister-in-law)
- Family: Venables
- Awards: Officer of the Order of the British Empire (1965)

Charles Joseph Venables OBE (1898–1989) was a British timber merchant and industrialist, known for his contributions to the British forestry industry. He served as Chairman and President of the Royal Forestry Society, led international trade and study missions on behalf of the government, and was appointed an Officer of the Order of the British Empire in 1965 for services to forestry.

== Early life ==
Venables was born in 1898, the son of Henry and Ellen Venables (née Jackson), a Stafford-based industrial family of Quakers.

== Career ==
Charles Venables succeeded his father as the head of Henry Venables Limited, the family enterprise founded in 1855 and passed down through three generations. The firm evolved to specialise in the supply of timber for a wide range of industries, including wheelwrights, coachbuilders, railways, and coal mining, as well as for major infrastructure projects such as the construction of the Manchester Ship Canal. The company contributed to a number of nationally significant works, supplying timber for the restoration of York Minster, the post fire reconstruction of the Lantern Lobby at Windsor Castle. Other notable projects included Shakespeare's Globe in London, and the Swan Theatre in Stratford-upon-Avon.

During the Second World War, Venables worked with Timber Control, where he was responsible for organising supplies of home-grown timber for the war effort. This role brought him into contact with numerous estates and landowners across the country, many of whom he would remain connected to throughout his career and personal life. His wartime experience helped shape a lifelong commitment to sustainable forestry and domestic timber production.

Venables was honoured in the 1965 Queen's Birthday Honours List with an OBE for services to forestry.

In 1968 Venables was appointed as the Chairman and President of the Royal Forestry Society. He had previously served as vice-president. He received the Society's gold medal in 1970.

In addition to his work with the Royal Forestry Society, Venables served as President of the Home Timber Merchants Association and the Council for the Preservation of Rural England and the Horticultural Society. An advocate for woodland preservation, he supported voluntary tree-planting efforts in Staffordshire and was active in promoting forestry awareness and education.

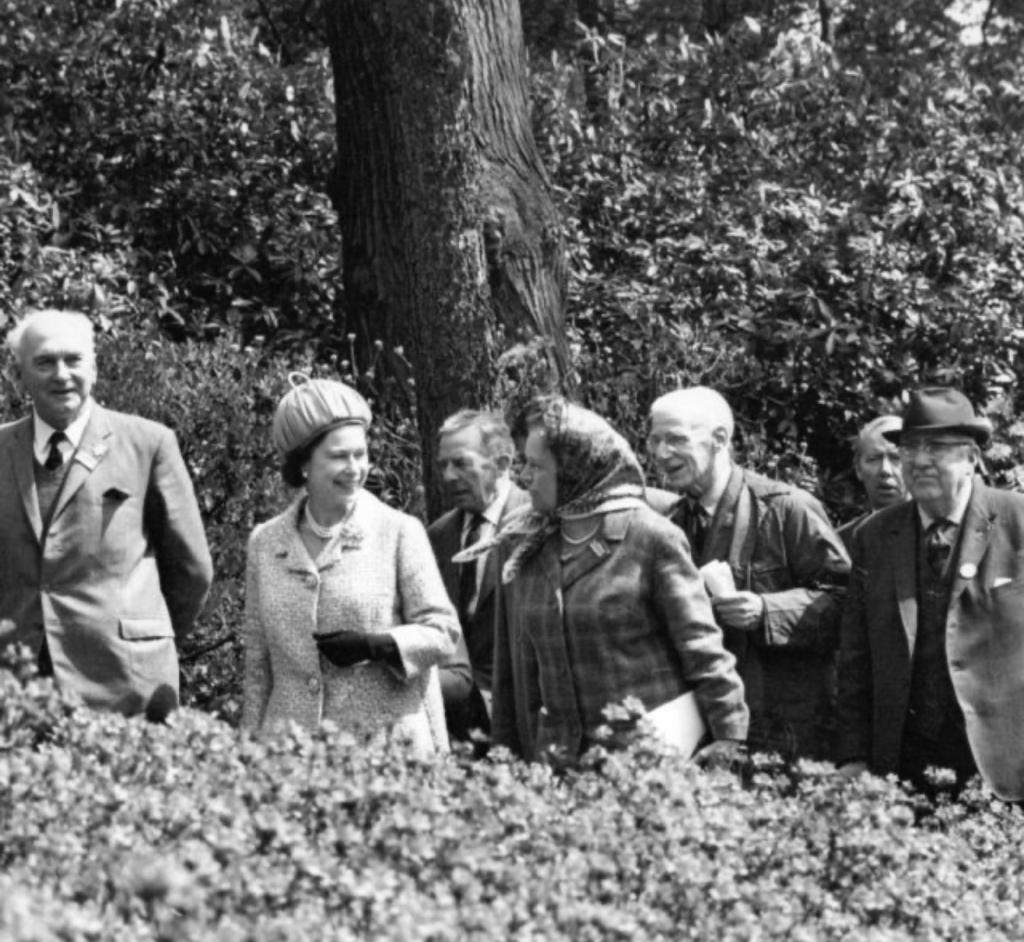
Mr Venables OBE (left) pictured with Elizabeth II (centre) and his wife, Mrs Venables (right)

Venables retired from the family business at the age of 78 and was succeeded by his son, Richard Venables, as Managing Director.

== Personal life ==
Venables married Nellie Jennings in 1927, sister of the Quaker academic and community activist Hilda Jennings. She came from another prominent Staffordshire family of industrialist Quakers, known for manufacturing boots. The couple had five children: John, Richard, Ruth, Anne, and Henry.
