= Independent Higher Education =

UK education representative body

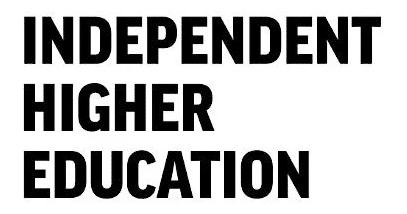
- Type: Representative body for higher education
- Headquarters: 7 Bedford Square, London WC1B 3RA
- Region served: United Kingdom
- Key people: James Pitman (Chair), Alex Proudfoot (Chief Executive)
- Website: ihe.ac.uk

Independent Higher Education is a representative body for some higher education institutions in the United Kingdom. It represents 'independent' providers of higher education, generally those that are non-university, international, or for-profit institutions. It is one of the sector bodies consulted by the UK Government on issues such as free speech at universities and the admission of students during the Covid pandemic. The chief executive of Independent Higher Education is a member of the Department for Business and Trade's Education Sector Advisory Group.

IHE is governed by a board of directors. The Chair of IHE is James Pitman.

== Members ==
IHE has 75 members:

- Academy of Contemporary Music
- Academy of Live Technology
- Accent Global Learning
- Aga Khan University
- Al-Maktoum College of Higher Education
- BCNO Group
- Bloomsbury Institute
- Brit College
- British Academy of Jewellery
- Cambridge School of Visual and Performing Arts
- Central Film School
- Chickenshed
- CIEE Study Abroad
- Collective Acting Studio
- The College of Legal Practice
- College of Medicine and Dentistry
- The College of Osteopaths
- The Counselling Foundation
- Condé Nast College of Fashion & Design
- Dartington Trust
- David Game Higher Education
- Dyson Institute of Engineering and Technology
- Escape Studios
- ESCP Business School
- Fashion Retail Academy
- Further Learning Group
- Futureworks
- House of Sassoon
- Inchbald School of Design
- Institute for Optimum Nutrition
- International Business College Manchester
- INTO University Partnerships
- Istituto Marangoni
- Kaplan International Pathways
- Kensington College of Business
- Laine Theatre Arts
- Le Cordon Bleu London
- Leiths School of Food and Wine
- Leo Baeck
- London Churchill College
- London Institute of Banking & Finance
- London Professional Training College
- London School of Architecture
- London School of Management Education
- Matrix College of Counselling and Psychotherapy
- Metanoia Institute
- MetFilm School
- National Design Academy
- National Motorsport Academy
- Norland
- Oak Hill College
- Oxford International
- Pen Green Centre
- Point Blank Music School
- QA Higher Education
- Raindance Film School
- Richmond American University London
- Roffey Park Institute
- Royal Academy of Dance
- Royal Academy Schools
- Ruskin Mill Centre for Practice
- SP Jain London School of Management
- SAE Institute
- Sotheby's Institute of Art
- Spurgeon's College
- Study Group
- TEDI-London
- Tavistock and Portman NHS Foundation Trust
- ThinkSpace Education
- UCFB
- University of Buckingham
- Waltham International College
- West Dean College

== See also ==
- Universities in the United Kingdom
- Russell Group
- GuildHE
