= West Wales Museum of Childhood =

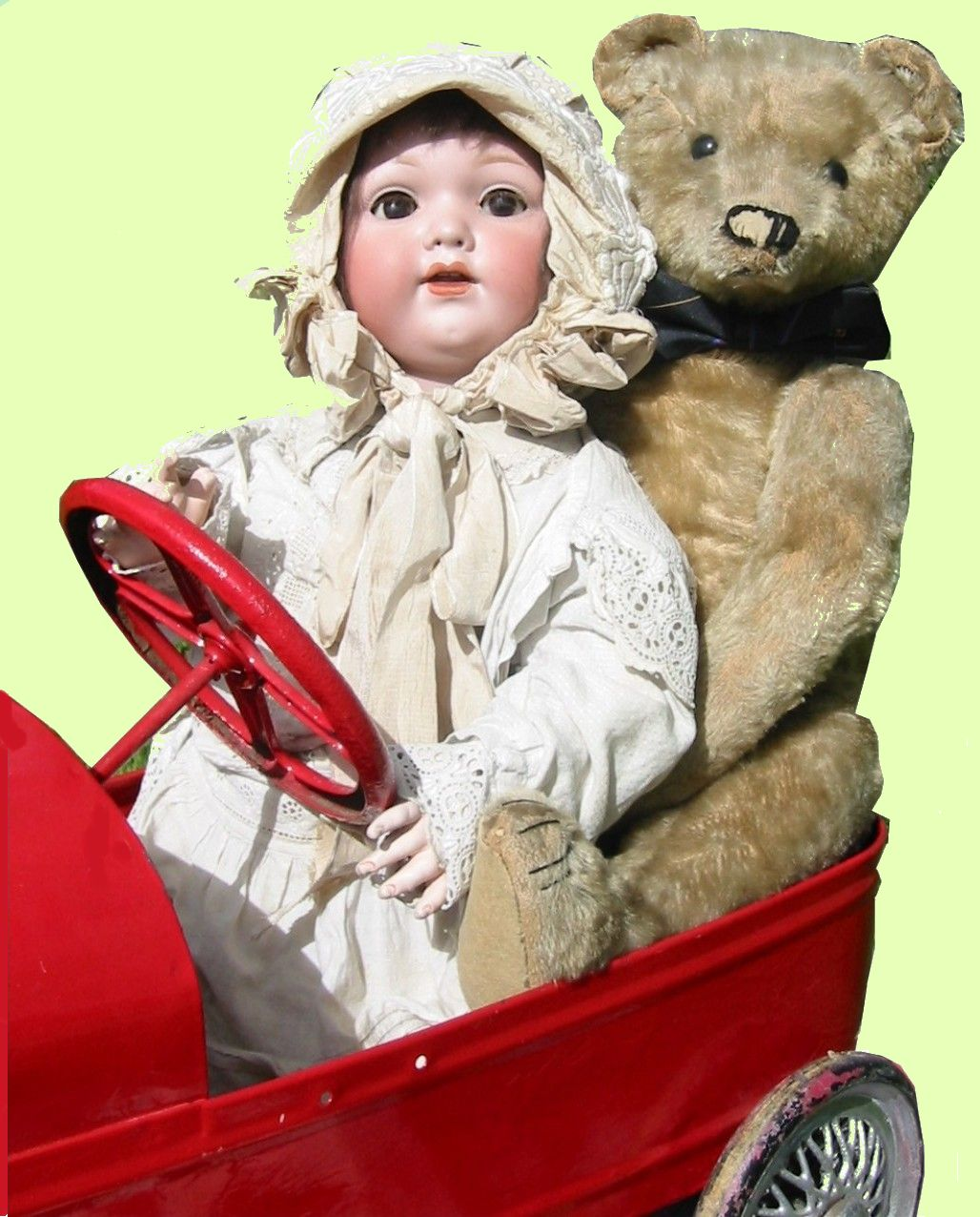
- Items typical of the museum's exhibits

- Location within Carmarthenshire
- Established: 2005
- Location: Llangeler, Carmarthenshire, Wales
- Coordinates: 52.0341°N 4.3830°W
- Type: Toy museum
- Website: West Wales Museum of Childhood

The West Wales Museum of Childhood was a museum in Wales which opened in 2005.

== Location ==
The West Wales Museum of Childhood was located in Llangeler, near Newcastle Emlyn along the A484, the Carmarthen to Cardigan road. It was sited in the River Teifi river valley only a short distance from the Welsh National Woollen Museum (latterly known as the National Wool Museum) at Drefach Felindre. The museum has now closed and the collection has been moved to Wisbech in Cambridgeshire.

== Exhibits ==
There were more than 10,000 items on display in the five galleries of the museum. Exhibits included toys, dolls, model trains, model cars, teddy bears, toy soldiers, costumes, pinball machines, games, a period schoolroom, and household items. The museum was a privately run enterprise and received no outside funding. Photos of some of the exhibits can still be seen on the People's Collection Wales website.

The museum was awarded accreditation under VisitWales VAQAS -the Welsh Assembly Government's Visitor Attraction Quality Accreditation Scheme

== See also ==
- Museums in Wales
- National Woollen Museum of Wales
