= Michael Izza =

Michael Donald McCartney Izza CBE (born December 1960) is the former CEO of the Institute of Chartered Accountants in England and Wales (ICAEW).

== Early life and education ==
Born in Bolton, Izza gained a law degree from Durham University, during which time he was also President of Durham Students' Union.

== Career ==
Upon graduation in 1983, Izza trained as a chartered accountant with Coopers & Lybrand in Manchester (now PwC).

Izza joined Canadian brewing company John Labatt Ltd. in 1989, becoming European vice president finance, progressing to managing director of the firm's European retail arm in 1992.

In 1997, Izza joined Spring Group Plc - as managing director of Spring Skills - then the UK's largest vocational training business - then progressing to group roles including finance director.

== ICAEW ==
Izza joined ICAEW in 2002 as executive director of finance and operations, becoming chief operating officer in 2004 and chief executive in 2006.

After the 2008 financial crisis, Izza chaired three HM Treasury working groups tasked with identifying independent valuers for Northern Rock, Bradford & Bingley and Dunfermline Building Society.

In 2009, Izza chaired an international corporate governance taskforce set up by the Leading Group of Nations to examine the relative merits of an international financial transactions tax.

Izza was a member of the UK Government's Small Business Economic Forum.

As of February 2019, Izza is a member of the advisory group supporting the UK Government's independent review into the quality and effectiveness of audit, led by Sir Donald Brydon.

Izza chairs Chartered Accountants Worldwide (CAW). He is also executive director of the Consultative Committee of Accountancy Bodies (CCAB) and a board member of the Global Accounting Alliance (GAA).

Izza is a member of the Worshipful Company of Chartered Accountants in England and Wales, one of the livery companies of the City of London.

== Personal life ==
Izza is married with two children.

Izza has been a trustee of several charities, and is currently on the trustee board of Moorfields Eye Charity, which supports Moorfields Eye Hospital.
