= International Voluntary Service =

International peace organisation

- Founded: 1931; 95 years ago
- Founder: Pierre Ceresole
- Headquarters: Edinburgh, Scotland
- Services: Peace, volunteering
- Website: ivsgb.org

International Voluntary Service (IVS), formerly International Voluntary Service for Peace (IVSP), is the British branch of the Service Civil International (SCI). Founded in 1931, IVS promotes peace through volunteering, both in the United Kingdom and other countries.

== Early history ==
SCI, of which IVS is a branch, was set up by Swiss engineer and pacifist Pierre Cérésole in the aftermath of World War I. It organised European workcamps in which volunteers from different countries came together to reconstruct war or disaster damaged sites in a spirit of peace. In 1931 SCI sent a team of international volunteers to the Welsh colliery town of Brynmawr, which was hard-hit by unemployment. The Quakers, joined by student organisations, had started relief work in Brymawr in 1929. The SCI team of 37 international volunteers helped build a public park, including outdoor swimming pool and paddling pool, alongside British volunteers and local men and women, during the summer of 1931. That same year saw the foundation of the International Voluntary Service for Peace (IVSP), the British branch of SCI, with Cérésole as president and Jean Inebuit, a Swiss school-teacher working in Leeds, as secretary. The first annual general meeting (AGM) was held in Leeds in October 1934 and a constitution was approved at the AGM the following year.

During the Spanish Civil War, IVSP sent a team of volunteers to a farm at Puigcerdà, near the French frontier, to produce food for children's colonies in the area. The project had to close when the Spanish government ordered foreigners to leave the border area. There were further projects in Britain in the 1930s, including the building of a football pitch and playground in Forge Side in South Wales, work on allotment gardens in Woodchurch, Merseyside, construction of a cesspit for the Cotswold Bruderhof and construction of a playground and garden in Gateshead-on-Tyne. Local unemployed people often worked alongside the volunteers on projects. IVSP also helped in the conversion of houses into hostels for the Youth Hostels Association. During the summer of 1939, IVSP volunteers worked on a Quaker-run project to convert Carclew House in Cornwall into a reception centre for refugees.

The outbreak of World War II in September 1939 made it impossible for IVSP to continue with international volunteering. Later that year the British government recognised IVSP work as an alternative to military service for conscientious objectors. IVSP volunteers did planting for the Forestry Commission in Hawkshead, Kershope and Kielder Forest. The Forestry Commission paid the men's wages to IVSP who provided board and lodging and pocket money to the workers and used the surplus to fund more projects. Other war-time projects included: aid to the Emergency Feeding Department in the borough of West Ham in east London; renovation of a hostel for war refugees in Market Rasen; a demolition service to clear bomb-damaged sites in Croydon and West Ham; and agricultural work in Whitehaven and Clows Top. A youth service was established to run harvest and fruit-picking camps for young people, including refugees, under the age of 18.

In February 1944 IVSP, under the auspices of the Council of British Societies for Relief Abroad, sent a unit of 12 volunteers to Egypt to work in refugee camps, and in December 1944 the unit was sent to join relief efforts in Greece. Another unit went to Italy and a third unit to Crete. Teams were also sent to carry out relief work in The Netherlands and Germany from April 1945.

In the immediate aftermath of the war, British IVSP volunteers continued with demolition work in West Ham, worked on Youth Hostels, built a summer camp for boys at Great Bardfield, Essex, and carried out work for the National Trust clearing ground at Polesden Lacey in Surrey. The organisation gradually resumed its international character, with a mutual exchange of volunteers from other European countries.

== Recent history and current work ==
In the late 1950s the organisation dropped the word "Peace" from its title in order to attract support from people who were not pacifists. Frank Judd, who was secretary general of the organisation from 1960 to 1966, had served in the Royal Air Force. Under the leadership of Judd, IVS moved away from purely "pick and shovel peace making" and towards more social programmes, for example recruiting volunteers to work in general and psychiatric hospitals. As well as camps in the UK, there were East-West camps in Socialist countries and longer-term work in developing countries. In 1971 a new office was opened to run the IVS Overseas programmes; in 1990 IVS Overseas was renamed as Skillshare International and became a separate legal entity. In 2016 Skillshare International went into administration.

In recent years IVS has been placing volunteers in projects run by partner organisations, such as the Camphill communities in Scotland and a meditation centre in Derby, rather than running their own workcamps. In 2025, IVS placed 57 volunteers on projects in the United Kingdom, while 18 volunteers went abroad.

The mission of IVS is to "promote peace, justice and understanding through volunteering". The original logo of the word Pax (Latin for Peace) written over a shovel and broken sword has been replaced with a dove on a blue background. The organisation is registered as a charity in England, Wales and Scotland and has its headquarters in Edinburgh. The IVS archives have been deposited at the Hull History Centre.

== See also ==
- Antimilitarism
- Anti-war movement
- European Voluntary Service
- List of anti-war organizations
- Peace movement

== Bibliography ==
- Arthur Gillette : One million volunteers: the story of volunteer youth service, Penguin Books, Harmondsworth, A pelican original, 1968, 258 p. on-line
- Hélène Monastier, Alice Brügger: Paix, pelle et pioche, Histoire du Service Civil International, Editions du Service civil international, Switzerland, 1966
- SCI : Service Civil International 1920-1990 - 70 years of Voluntary Service for Peace and Reconciliation, Verdun, 1990
