= Winifred Gill =

British artist, social reformer and craftswoman

- Born: 1891; Guildford, England
- Died: 1981 (aged 89–90)
- Relatives: 6 sisters, 1 brother

Winifred Gill (1891–1981) was a British artist, social reformer and craftswoman. Her extensive correspondence is an important source of information about the Omega Workshop, 1913–1919, set up by Roger Fry of the Bloomsbury Group.

== Early life ==
Winifred Gill was born in Guildford. Her family were Quakers, which influenced the rest of her life. She had 6 sisters (one died in infancy) and a brother. She attended the Slade School of Art, part-time.

== Involvement with the Bloomsbury Group and Omega Workshops ==
Gill joined Roger Fry's family initially to help with childcare, then as a secretary and then as a general assistant. Fry was one of the Bloomsbury Group and started the Omega Workshops in 1913 where artists worked three and a half days a week for thirty shillings (a subsistence wage at the time), with their remaining time available for their own art. Notable artists in the Omega Workshops were Duncan Grant and Vanessa Bell. Gill was invited to join them and soon had a key role in running it as well as contributing to its designs and products, and was its only salaried employee.

Winifred Gill produced woodblock and lino prints, clothing designs, toys, marionettes and jewellery. She took over running the Omega Workshops after men were called up during the war, and remained at the workshop until early 1917. She was a prolific letter-writer to correspondents including Walter de la Mare, Roger Fry and others in the Bloomsbury movement and Omega Workshops and these are now archived in the Bodleian Library and an important source of information about the group.

== Later life ==
Gill taught art as a school teacher, before becoming involved with the University Settlement movement in Bristol and Manchester, where she worked alongside the community activist Hilda Jennings. She wrote poetry which was published, took part in an archeological dig at Glastonbury, Somerset and carried out some of the earliest audience research about radio broadcasting for the BBC, also in partnership with Hilda Jennings. During the Second World War she worked with internees on the Isle of Wight. She lived in the East End of London for the last 27 years of her life.
