= Architects' Co-Partnership =

Firm of English Architects

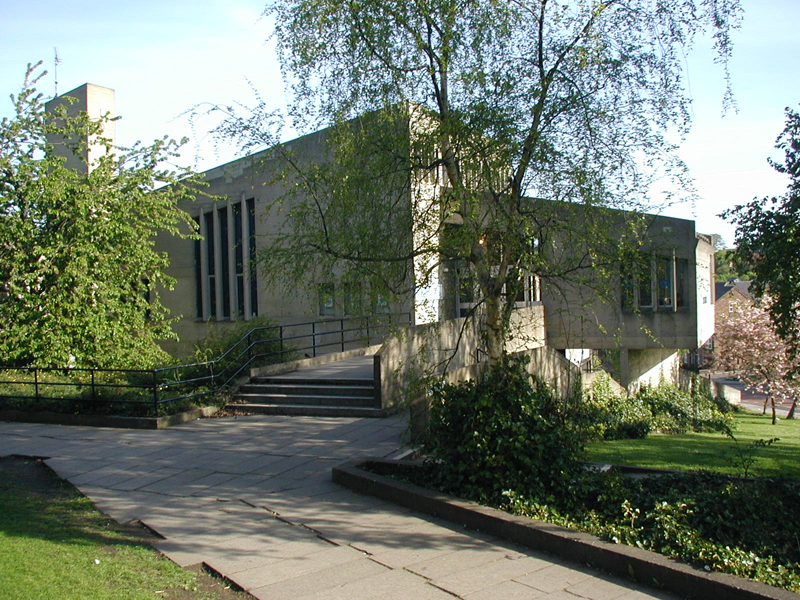
Dunelm House, Durham, 1966 by Richard Raines and Michael Powers of the Architects' Co-Partnership

The Architects' Co-Partnership (ACP) was a firm of English architects, founded in 1939 as the Architects' Cooperative Partnership by recent graduates of the Architectural Association School of Architecture. It encouraged teamwork, and set out to be a practice in which all members would be equal.

The firm filed for insolvency in 2014, and finally dissolved in 2018.

== Notable buildings ==
Its notable buildings include:

- Brynmawr rubber factory (Michael Powers, 1946–52, with Ove Arup), the first post-war building to receive listed status
- Danegrove Primary School (1949–50)
- Dunelm House, Durham (Richard Raines and Michael Powers, 1966)
- "Beehives", St John's College, Oxford (Michael Powers, 1958–60), the first modern student accommodation at the University of Oxford
- St Paul's Cathedral School, London (Leo de Syllas and Michael Powers, 1962–7)
- University of Essex, Colchester (Kenneth Capon, 1964)
- Wolfson Building, Trinity College, Cambridge (1968–72)
- Levi Strauss & Co. UK HQ and distribution centre, Northampton (1999)
