= Brynmawr Furniture =

Welsh furniture company (active 1930–1940)

Brynmawr Furniture Makers Ltd
- Company type: Private company (Ltd)
- Industry: Furniture manufacturing
- Founded: 1930 (as part of the Brynmawr Experiment; work began 1929)
- Founders: Peter Scott (Quaker organiser); Paul Matt (designer)
- Defunct: 1940
- Fate: Closed due to wartime supply constraints and declining demand
- Headquarters: Brynmawr, Wales, United Kingdom
- Area served: United Kingdom
- Key people: Peter Scott; Paul Matt; Arthur Basil Reynolds
- Products: Furniture (utilitarian designs)

Brynmawr Furniture Makers Ltd was a furniture manufacturing company set up in the midst of the Great Depression in the United Kingdom as part of the Brynmawr Experiment in Brynmawr, Wales.

Following the General Strike in 1926, Brynmawr had been particularly badly affected and was left with high levels of unemployment. Brynmawr Furniture Makers factory was set up as part of Quaker-led effort to tackle the issues starting in 1929. It was known for well-made utilitarian designs but closed in 1940.

== History ==
A small group of Quakers arrived in Brynmawr in 1928–9 intending to provide relief supplies and encourage social work. The group was led by Peter Scott, who began developing ways to encourage industries and employment. These were at first incorporated as Brynmawr and Clydach Valleys Ltd and included knitting, Welsh tweed, boot-making and furniture-making in a former boot factory.

In time it emerged that only boot-making and furniture manufacturing could provide sustainable employment for workers, the former because of retained local knowledge and the latter because of the inspirational leadership of Paul Matt.

== Paul Matt ==
Paul Matt had worked his apprenticeship with his father, a talented cabinet-maker from Hamburg, Germany. He arrived in Brynmawr with the Quakers and in 1930 set down plans for a furniture production factory. Peter Scott promoted this idea and was able to raise £6,000 (equivalent to £480,000 in 2023), which enabled work to start.

The available workers were inexperienced and lack skills, so Paul Matt designed a range of simple furniture which could be made well. The first order was for 400 chairs for a Quaker school in York, and production began. The cost of each chair was £1 (equivalent to £80 in 2023), and the profits were used for new equipment and machinery.

Matt's designs gave the furniture a distinct style with bevels being regularly used to give a rounded style and to disguise the use of plywood. The design had a simple and minimal appearance, reflecting Quaker philosophy.

== Operations ==
Items were made to order in small batches, mostly with laminated panels slotting into a solid wood framework. A large fret saw was used to cut solid wood items like chair legs then the frame rebates were cut on a circular saw. The panels were added and the edges bevelled with a circular saw.

At the time it was unusual to use laminated plywood as it was considered low quality, but Paul Matt believed that using a framework made them more secure.

Imported oak was regularly used as there were excess supplies available in Cardiff and later a high quality laminated Australian walnut was acquired for use. Finished items were then finished with a hard wax.

Finished items were relatively expensive and sold in department stores such as David Morgan in Cardiff and at specialist exhibitions. Many of the designs used Welsh placenames, including the Cwmbran chest, Llanelli table and the Cwm-du chair, and the furniture was particularly popular with Welsh professional and academic customers.

In 1936 Paul Matt left the company and was succeeded by his assistant, Arthur Basil Reynolds. At this time, slight changes to Matt's designs were introduced and walnut furniture was included in the collections. The following year the Gwalia works factory was gutted by fire. A new building was erected near the old site in 1937.

== Bardic chair ==
Brynmawr Furniture Makers were commissioned to make the bardic chair for the 1938 National Eisteddfod of Wales, which that year was held in Cardiff. The chair was required to be made from oak grown in Wales and made by Welsh Craftsmen. A small committee of experts representing the Society and the 1938 Eisteddfod were chosen to work with the Brynmawr Furniture Makers, responsible for the design. The chair, fashioned in oak, with the seat and the central slat of the back in natural hide. In keeping with the traditions of Brynmawr furniture, ornamentation was restrained and sparse, limited to the reeding of the arm-uprights where the fingers rest. The leather at the back of the chair bore a coloured representation of the Arms of Wales in red and gold as registered at the College of Heralds. Below this was the inscription Eisteddfod Genedlaethol Frenhinol Cymru, Caerdydd, 1938. The top rail of the back was incised behind Anrheg y Cardiff Naturalists' Society (Gift of the Cardiff Naturalists' Society).

=== Closure ===
Importing materials became difficult after the onset of World War II and the demand for high quality furniture rapidly declined forcing the Brynmawr Furniture Company to close its doors for the last time in 1940.

== See also ==
- Utility furniture, a related style of British furniture made in the 1940s.
