= Brynmawr Experiment =

The Brynmawr Experiment was an effort led by Peter Scott to address issues of poverty and unemployment in Brynmawr, South Wales, between 1929 and 1939. Initially a relief project response of the Quakers in South-East England, it grew first into an effort to set up small industries and finally an ambitious utopian subsistence agriculture project for unemployed workers.

Having received large amounts of money from government and private donations, the projects barely made a profit throughout their existence and finally closed in 1939. The official reason for their closure was that unemployment was wiped out due to the opening of local armament factories in the wake of the Second World War, but credit and government loans were also not extended which meant that the projects could not continue.

== Background ==
The 1920s were a decade of economic decline in the South Wales Coalfield as a whole and in particular in the town of Brynmawr.

Geographically, Brynmawr sits at the northern side of the coalfield and had little industry, and so people tended to need to commute to work elsewhere. When these industries slumped, workers in Brynmawr had few alternatives.

When Hilda Jennings arrived in Brynmawr in 1929 to lead a survey that was to take 3 years to complete, she found many problems. Many jobs were dependent on neighbouring coal and ironworks, and traveling workers were often the first to be laid off. The impacts were even worse as there has been an overall migration away from the town between 1921 and 1931.

By 1932, 1669 were permanently unemployed, many of whom had been laid off since the General Strike five years before. This led to increased sickness, poor housing and strain on the local authority budgets. There was also an impact on local shops and businesses which were forced to go bankrupt when creditors could not find work or pay their bills.

== Quaker response ==
In response to the increase in poverty in the South Wales coalfield after the General Strike, the Friend's Home Committee of the Religious Society of Friends (Quakers) set up the Coalfields Distress Committee in 1926 to consider how to respond. After receiving reports from Quakers working in other parts of the area, it was decided to raise a group of volunteers prepared to live and work in Brynmawr.

This area was identified as being particularly vulnerable, because the local coal mines were considered exhausted and there seemed little chance of traditional industries returning. Those who were able to work had to travel long distances to work and many young and older workers could find no employment at all.

In addition, the size of the town at the time (estimated as being 7000) was considered to be of a size that relief work was possible and personal.

The Quakers also had good relations with the town of Worthing which enabled and encouraged the initial work.

The Brynmawr Experiment was carried on for most of the period that it existed as a vision of Peter Scott, a former Royal Field Artillery Captain and well-known figure in Quaker circles in the South-East of England after the First World War.

There were three periods of activity which can be considered to be part of the Brynmawr Experiment and that were associated with Peter Scott. These were an initial period associated with the Quakers. A second period associated with the development of small scale factory production in Brynmawr and a final period where he tried to create a utopian society based on subsistence agriculture and unpaid volunteer labour.

== Relief and social work ==
In 1928 and 1929, a small group of Quakers moved to Brynmawr and began to try to address the immediate needs. This work included:

- The distribution of used clothing collected from around the country, particularly in Worthing
- The organisation of clubs and social services for men, women and children
- A nursery school
- Organisation of unemployed men to clean up the area, rebuild and repair buildings.
- A Community House as a centre for community activities.

The Quakers set up a Community Council in Brynmawr with the intention that local people would be engaged in making decisions about these projects.

..Community Council does not usurp the functions of the local authority or any statutory body. It functions in experimental ways and in fields of work where the official bodies cannot or do not function

— An Order of friends Annual Report 1936

=== International volunteers ===
The Brynmawr experiment came to the attention of Pierre Cérésole, founder of Service Civil International. Cérésole had been made aware of the project by fellow Swiss Quaker, Jean Inebnit, a lecturer at the University of Leeds. Cérésole and Inebnit successfully proposed to Peter Scott that the Brynmawr experiment be opened up to volunteers from mainland Europe and an International Work Camp was organised in 1931: 116 volunteers from British universities and from continental Europe worked together for three months in Brynmawr. The inclusion of international volunteers at Brynmawr is recognised by the International Voluntary Service as the organisation's founding moment.

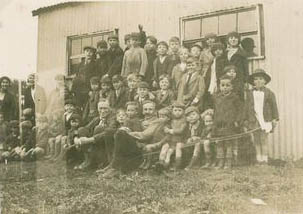
Pierre Cérésole at the International Work Camp, Brynmawr in 1931

By the end of 1931, volunteers had built a swimming pool, a children's paddling pool and a park in land donated by the Duke of Beaufort and contributed a total of 47,000 man-days of labour. The international camp also led to publicity about the work in Brynmawr in local, national and international media. One of those who came to Brynmawr with the work camp was Jim Forrester, the son of the Earl of Verulam, who was later to be involved in the Brynmawr Experiment.

== Developing local industries ==
Peter Scott's vision for the transformation of Brynmawr involved the creation of small industrial workshops which would bring sustainable work to unemployed workers.

A local unused boot factory was bought in 1930 and funding sought to attempt different ideas. Once £6000 had been raised, the factory space was adapted for new uses. At first, these included weaving Welsh tweed, knitting of socks, furniture and bootmaking. Outside of the factory, a coal level and a poultry unit were started. All of these projects were intended to be run as Co-operatives.

Eventually it was decided to only continue with boot and furniture manufacturing.

== An Order of friends ==
In 1934, Peter Scott reorganised a core group of people around him as "An Order of friends", ultimately cutting himself off from the Quaker central committees following disagreements about grants and funding for his projects. Scott believed that the work in Brynmawr could raise money itself and worked to apply directly for money from the Government.

The Order had ultimate ownership of projects and was intended to facilitate them, organise funds and promote the work. When the Brynmawr Furniture Makers Ltd and Brynmawr Bootmaking Ltd were set up, they were owned by Order Holdings Ltd, a not-for-profit run by the Order.

== Brynmawr furniture ==
In 1929, a young and skilled furniture designer called Paul Matt was brought in to the work in Brynmawr and set about developing a particular style even though the initial premises and tools were rudimentary and shared with the bootmaking business. An order of 250 oak chairs for a school in Yorkshire was the first big order and encouraged further development of the factory.

By 1937, the furniture had a showroom in London and was available in department stores, including in Cardiff.

== Subsistence Production Societies ==
The final part of Peter Scott's vision for work in the Brynmawr area was what he called The Subsistence Production Societies. The concept was that in return for voluntary work for the project, members would be able to buy goods and produce at a much lower price than they could buy in the local shops.

Under an agreement made with the Government in 1936, unemployed insured workers could continue to collect "dole" payments if they volunteered for the SPS and were available for work if any came available. One was Bauhaus teacher Ludwig Hirschfeld-Mack who from May 1936 was employed there in the carpentry workshop before being deported to Australia in 1940 as an 'enemy alien'.

Initially, Peter Scott had been asked to set up several societies, but would only commit to two. One was near Wigan and the other near Brynmawr.

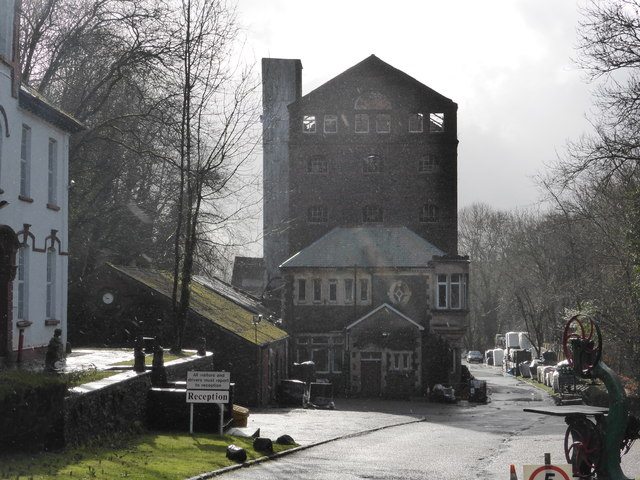
The Old Brewery, Cwmavon - site of much of the work of the Eastern Valley SPS

Initially, suitable land could not be found close to Brynmawr so the SPS was set up in the "Eastern Valley", defined as the area between Cwmavon, Cwmbran, Brynmawr and Llandegvath.

The Old Brewery at Cwmavon was bought and became the main centre of activities. This included a bakery, butchers, factory for making clothes a canteen and the stores where members could buy goods. Hirschfeld-Mack's 1936 drawing of the brewery and the valley is held in the University of Melbourne art collection.

Court Perrott dairy farm at Llandegveth was taken on and by 1937 had 100 Ayrshire cattle, pigs and sheep.

Land at Pontymoile was used to build glasshouses to grow vegetables and fruit trees were planted at Llwyn-y-llan farm, Trevethin.

At Beili Glas behind the old Brewery in Cwmavon pigs were kept and a small quarry opened for stone.

In Griffithstown five fields were used for poultry, pigs and vegetables and in Pontnewydd there were bee-hives and a wood-working shop.

Buildings were refurbished and new houses were built.

At the peak in 1937 there were 400 men in the society, about 9% of the unemployed men registered at the Blaenavon and Pontpool labour exchange at the time. It was decided to expand to form a second SPS with the purchase of two farms nearer Brynmawr and the opening of a coal level.

=== Jim Forrester ===
James Grimston, the heir apparent to the title of Earl of Verulam, first came to Brynmawr with the international volunteer camp, but was later appointed to lead the SPS as Area Organiser. He continued to also work in his family business one week a month.

He was known by the courtesy family title "Lord Forrester" or, more commonly, just Jim Forrester in Wales.

In 1934 he was made chairman of the SPS and in 1935 director of the Brynmawr Bootmaker factory.

== Criticisms and detractors ==
Writing in 1980, nearly 50 years after the events, Margaret Pitt remembered that there had been opposition to the work in Brynmawr from the earliest efforts.

When she arrived in Brynmawr in 1928, Pitt found that local people distrusted the Quakers and did not want to accept charity. In 1929, a town meeting was held to discuss plans for voluntary work in the town. Some unemployed men said that working for free would weaken their position with respect to future employment leading to the Labour party and Miners' Federation declaring that they were against the plans and that all work should be paid at Union rates. This meant that those who continued to be involved in the projects risked shunning.

Later, the factories and SPS became a source of anger. Peter Scott successfully gained support and finances from government, Royalty and industrialists, including the Prince of Wales, Ramsay MacDonald and David Lloyd George.

This led to conflict with local Communists, shopkeepers, co-ops and trade unions.

In response to comments in a speech by the Prime Minister praising the work in Brynmawr, members of Brynmawr Urban Council wrote back that the praise was unwarranted, that some of the experimental work had already stopped and that the others were not very useful for the unemployed.

The Brynmawr Experiment opened and closed various enterprises causing discontent from those who had lost work and felt left behind. The Order was felt to be a "privileged", distant group. The management, in particular Jim Forrester, was seen as perfectionist and made too many decisions on their own.

== Decline and end ==
In 1938, the government opened an ordnance depot at Glascoed which provided work for many members of the Subsistence Production Societies and made operations more difficult for the remaining members. In the summer of 1939, most operations stopped due to a lack of bank credit and 28 older men were taken on as paid employees but by December 1939 all operations stopped, the business was liquidated and the properties put up for auction.

The SPS had spent nearly £100,000 of government funds, together with an additional £50,000 private donations.

== Sources ==
- Walespast.com
- Brynmawrscene
- Thomasgenweb
