= Enfield Rolling Mills =

British metal manufacturing company

- Company type: Public company (formerly)
- Industry: Metal
- Defunct: 1980
- Fate: Closed after no being longer competitive
- Headquarters: Enfield Lock, London, United Kingdom
- Area served: United Kingdom
- Products: Copper cable, rolled aluminium, rolled copper, rolled zinc, and zinc cans
- Owner: Delta Metals Co.

Enfield Rolling Mills was a British manufacturer of non-ferrous metals. The company operated from 1924 until the mill was closed in 1980 after several ownership changes.

== History ==
The company was founded in 1924 as a private company, located on the River Lea in Enfield Lock near London. In 1933, it became a public company, and became known as 'Enfield Rolling Mills Ltd' (ERM). Principal products were rolled aluminium, rolled copper, rolled zinc, and zinc cans.

During World War II, production increased greatly and continued to expand during the post-war years.

In 1959, ERM acquired Enfield Cables, and formed a joint venture with Standard Telephones and Cables, to create a new subsidiary specializing in manufacturing electric cables, Enfield Standard Power Cables Ltd.

In 1961, ERM formed a joint venture with Delta Metals Co, to create a new company Delta Enfield Rolled Metals. Two years later, in 1963, the Delta Group acquired all of ERM, thus forming one of the largest non-ferrous metal groups in Europe.

By 1980, Delta Enfield Rolled Metals was no longer competitive on world markets, and the factory closed.
