= James Grimston, 4th Earl of Verulam =

British peer, electrical engineer and businessman (1880–1949)

James Walter Grimston, 4th Earl of Verulam (17 April 1880 – 29 November 1949) was a British peer, electrical engineer and businessman, sometimes identified with the fringes of the intelligence service.

== Early life and education ==
Verulam was the son of James Grimston, 3rd Earl of Verulam and Margaret Frances Graham. He was educated at Eton and Christ Church, Oxford. He succeeded to the earldom upon the death of his father in 1924.

== Career ==
Verulam founded Enfield Cables Ltd and had many business interests in oil and telecommunications, including as a director of British Thomson-Houston. He reputedly allowed MI6 the use of some of the premises on his estate and was a business associate and personal friend of World War II internee Robert Liversidge.

== Marriage and children ==
Verulam married Lady Violet Constance Maitland Brabazon (1886–1936), younger daughter of Reginald Brabazon, 12th Earl of Meath, on 27 October 1909. They had four sons, two of whom succeeded to the earldom and two of whom were killed in action in the Second World War.

- James Brabazon Grimston, 5th Earl of Verulam (11 October 1910 - 19 October 1960)
- John Grimston, 6th Earl of Verulam (17 July 1912 - 15 April 1973)
- Squadron Leader Hon Brian Grimston, DFC (19 March 1914 - killed in action 4 April 1943)
- Flight Lieutenant Hon Bruce David Grimston, DFC (8 December 1915 - killed in action 12 July 1944)

== Death ==
Verulam died in November 1949 at the age of 69 and was succeeded in his titles by his son, James.

== Bibliography ==
- Leigh Rayment's Peerage Pages
- Kidd, Charles, Williamson, David (editors). Debrett's Peerage and Baronetage (1990 edition). New York: St Martin's Press, 1990.

Peerage of the United Kingdom
Preceded by James Walter Grimston	Earl of Verulam; 1924–1949	Succeeded by James Brabazon Grimston
