= Penrhos Cottage =

Coordinates: 51°53′53″N 4°45′39″W

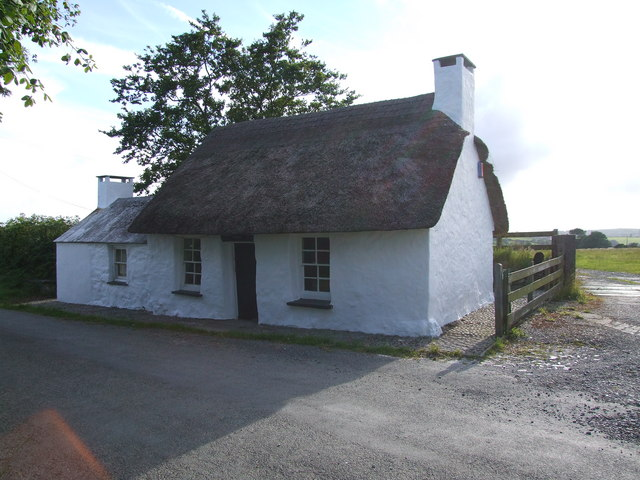
Penrhos Cottage in 2008

Penrhos Cottage is a very small cottage situated to the south east of Maenclochog. It was built as a ty un nos (house built in one night) around 1800, later rebuilt in stone, and last occupied in 1967. The typical North Pembrokeshire thatched cottage was once home to a family of 12, and is almost unchanged since the 19th century, having retained its original Welsh oak furniture. It is the last thatched cottage in Pembrokeshire.
