= Barclay Hall, Forest Gate =

Coordinates: 51.5422°N 0.0324°E

Barclay Hall, E7 8JQ, is a 1900 building located in London's Green Street, Forest Gate.

== History ==
Barclay Hall was founded by the Bedford Institute Association, a Quaker philanthropic organisation, in 1900, when an iron building was erected in memory of Joseph and Jane Barclay, of Knotts Green, Leyton, one of several eminent Quaker families in the area. Within a year over 800 people were already connected with various religious, social, and educational activities at the centre, and another building had been added. In 1902 Barclay Hall became a full mission church, in 1904 the Sunday meeting was recognised under the Radcliff and Barking monthly meeting and in 1906 a permanent brick building was opened. The hall was bought by the borough council in 1948, and in 1949 was reopened as an adult education and social centre. In its lifetime it has also been the location of Newham’s Chamber of Commerce, as well as being a campus for Newham College of Further Education before finally becoming London Churchill College’s main campus.

== Modern appearance ==
The building would have originally had a curved gable, but this has since been replaced with a straight one. The main entrance is under a stone arch, which was glazed when renovated by Newham Council in 1996. The smaller entrance on the side of the building still has its original door in the rustic style of Quaker tradition. Plain walls to the west and north of the campus suggest further extensions were intended but never happened.
