= Enfield Cables =

Enfield Cables Ltd. was a British manufacturer of electric cables.

The company was founded in 1913 by James Grimston as the Enfield Electric Cable Manufacturing Co Ltd, located on the River Lea in Enfield Lock. In 1959, as Enfield Cables Ltd, it was acquired by Enfield Rolling Mills Ltd (ERM) and a new company, Enfield Standard Power Cables Ltd (ESPC) was formed jointly owned with STC. In 1963 the Delta Group acquired ERM together with its interest in ESPC, and in 1964 it acquired STC's and Tube Investments' interest in ESPC. The company was then known as Delta Enfield Cables Ltd
