= Brynmawr =

Town in Blaenau Gwent, Wales

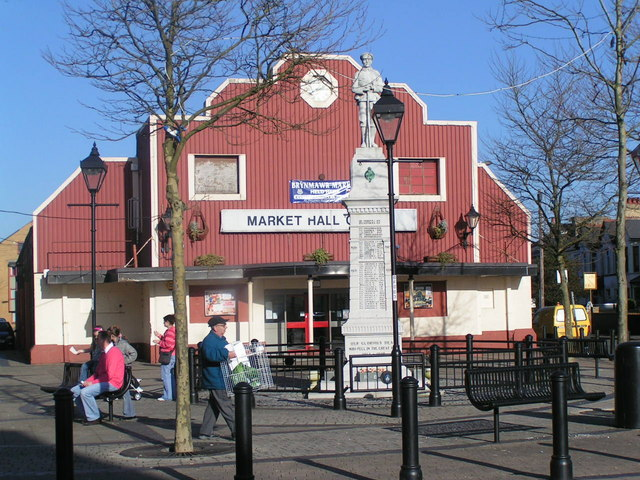
- Market Square and Market Hall Cinema

- Location within Blaenau Gwent
- Population: 5,530 (2011)
- OS grid reference: SO185115
- Principal area: Blaenau Gwent
- Preserved county: Gwent
- Country: Wales
- Sovereign state: United Kingdom
- Post town: EBBW VALE
- Postcode district: NP23
- Dialling code: 01495
- Police: Gwent
- Fire: South Wales
- Ambulance: Welsh
- UK Parliament: Blaenau Gwent and Rhymney
- Senedd Cymru – Welsh Parliament: Blaenau Gwent
- Website: brynmawrtc.co.uk
- List of places UK Wales Blaenau Gwent 51.796°N 3.183°W Map of the community

Brynmawr (/brɪnˈmaʊər/ brin-MOUR, Welsh: [brɨnˈmaur]; Welsh for 'big hill') (Note: The name is preferably spelt in Welsh with a hyphen as Bryn-mawr.) is a market town, community and electoral ward in Blaenau Gwent, Wales. The town, sometimes cited as the highest town in Wales, is situated at 1,250 to 1,500 feet (380 to 460 m) above sea level at the head of the South Wales Valleys. It grew with the development of the coal mining and iron industries in the early 19th century. Until the reorganisation of local authorities in 1974, Brynmawr was administered as part of the county of Brecknockshire.

== Welsh language ==
According to the 2011 Census, 6.0% of the ward's 5,530 (332 residents) resident population could speak, read, and write Welsh. This was above the county's proportion of 5.5% of 67,348 (3,705 residents). Until 2010, when the school relocated to a new building in Blaina, the town had the only Welsh-medium primary school, Ysgol Gymraeg Brynmawr, in Blaenau Gwent; the school had 310 pupils ranging from nursery to year 6.

== History ==
Prior to the Industrial Revolution and the founding of Brynmawr, a settlement called Gwaun Helygen (meaning 'marsh of the willows') sat on a small area of moorland on the border between the counties of Monmouthshire and Brecknockshire. The village consisted of a few scattered farmhouses, a slew of small tram roads that led to the surrounding coal deposits, a staging inn, and a turnpike road from Abergavenny to Merthyr Tydfil which crossed through the bleak upland plateau.

With the development of Nantyglo ironworks under Crawshay Bailey in the early 19th century, suitable housing was needed for the workers, and thus the area of upland home to Gwaun Helygen was chosen as an ideal area for a settlement. Houses began to spring up around the tram roads and the turnpike road, and the town began to rapidly grow. Although the settlement was not home to any heavy industry, and was for the most part a dormitory town, several above-ground ore deposits outside of the town were worked on, and a few underground levels were eventually dug beneath Brynmawr. However, as early as the 1870s, many of the resources that were once considered abundant had been exhausted, and the local industry began to decline. As the town's residents practically solely relied on the surrounding industries, many of them left the town in search of employment, and Brynmawr witnessed a sharp drop in population.

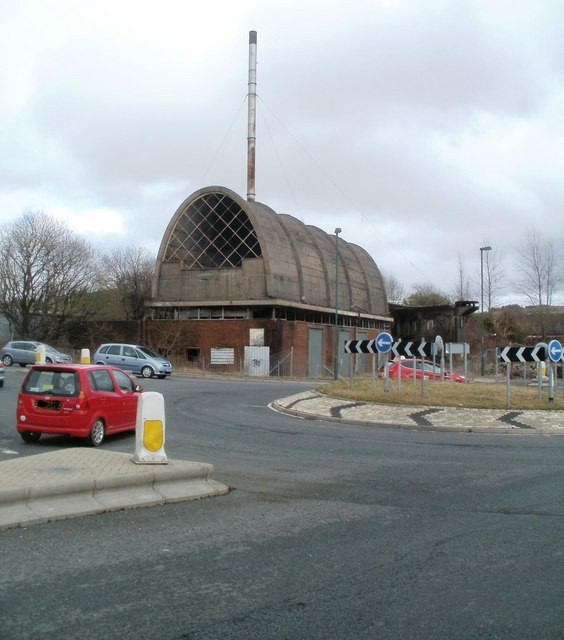
The derelict Semtex boilerhouse in 2011

The town's market hall, now the Market Hall Cinema, was built in 1894, and replaced the older town hall built in 1844.

By the time of the Great Depression, most of the town's population were unemployed, which attracted the attention of a group of Quakers, whose work in the town to relieve unemployment culminated in the Brynmawr Experiment.

In 1952, Jim Forrester of Enfield Cables Ltd opened a factory in the town, which was eventually acquired by the Dunlop Rubber Company. Operating under the brand name of Dunlop Semtex Ltd, the factory produced flooring for the health and education sectors up until its closure in 1981. It was largely demolished in 2001.

== Governance ==
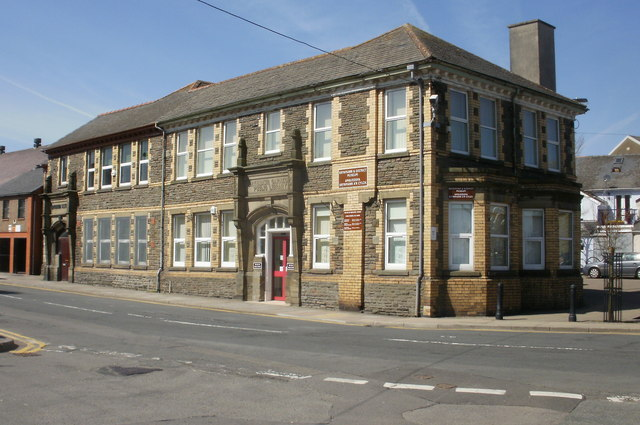
Brynmawr and District Museum (formerly the Carnegie Library) and Brynmawr Institute, Market Square

There are two tiers of local government covering Brynmawr, at community (town) and county borough level: Brynmawr Town Council and Blaenau Gwent County Borough Council. The town council has its offices at the Community Centre on Orchard Street and holds its meetings at Brynmawr Institute on Market Square.

=== Administrative history ===
The area that is now Brynmawr historically straddled three parishes and two counties: the parishes of Llanelly and Llangattock in Brecknockshire, and the parish of Aberystruth in Monmouthshire. A boundary stone at the corner of Boundary Street and Bailey Street marks the point where the three parishes met. A Byrnmawr local board district was established in 1851 covering parts of the two Brecknockshire parishes of Llanelly and Llangattock. The district was enlarged in 1885 to also cover part of the parish of Aberystruth in Monmouthshire.

Elected county councils were established in 1889 under the Local Government Act 1888, which also directed that local board districts that straddled county boundaries, as Byrnmawr did, should be placed entirely in the county which had the majority of the district's population. The Monmouthshire parts of the Brynmawr local board district were therefore transferred to Brecknockshire in 1889, such that the whole district was then in Brecknockshire. Local board districts were converted into urban districts under the Local Government Act 1894. A civil parish of Brynmawr covering the same area as the urban district was created in 1900. Brynmawr Urban District Council bought Trafalgar House on Alma Street in 1913 to serve as its offices and meeting place, and remained based there until the council's abolition.

Brynmawr Urban District was abolished in 1974 under the Local Government Act 1972. Its area instead became a community called Brynmawr within the new borough of Blaenau Gwent and county of Gwent. The former urban district council's functions therefore passed to Blaenau Gwent Borough Council, which in 1996 was reconstituted a county borough, taking over the functions of the abolished Gwent County Council.

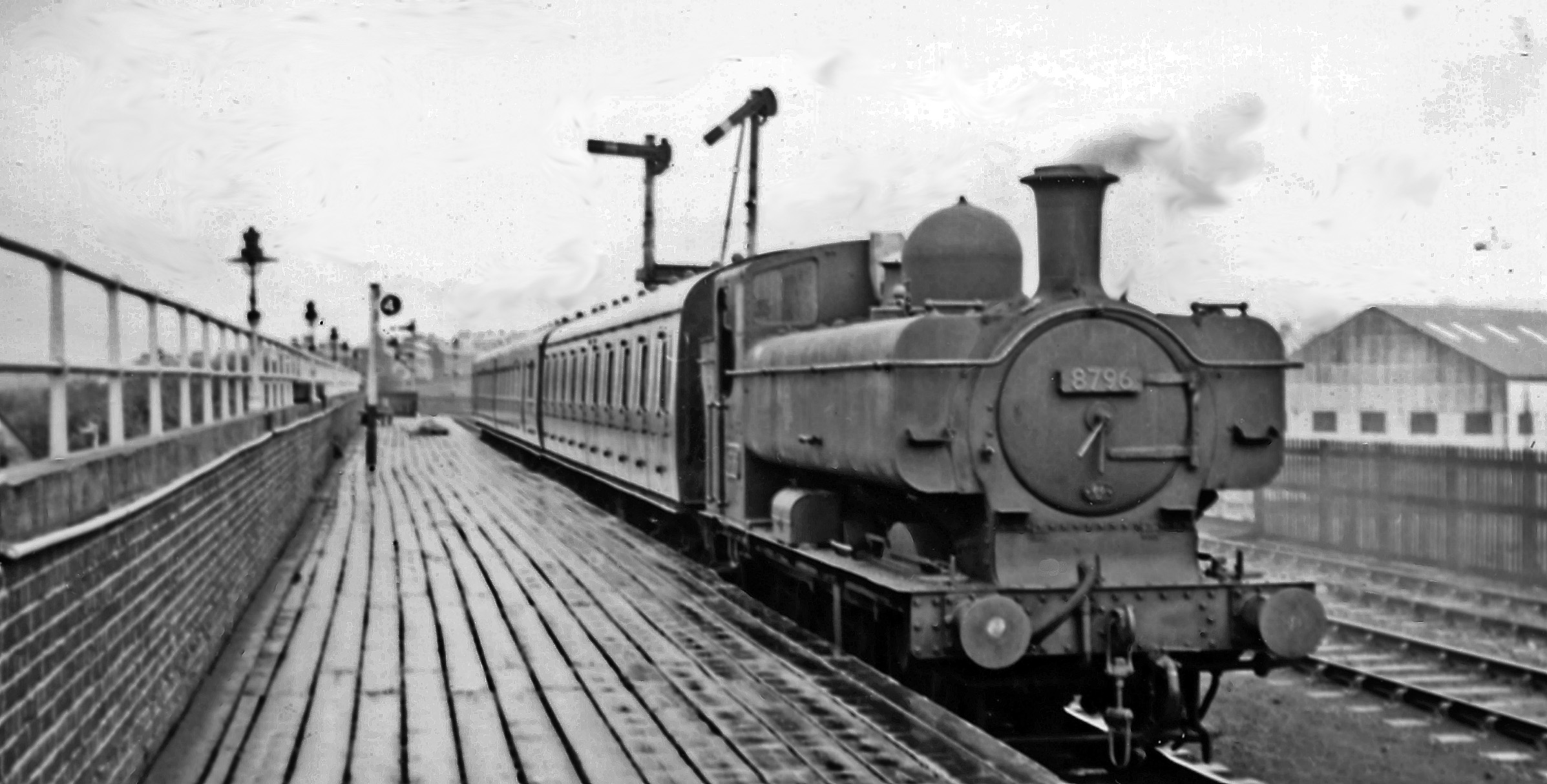
Brynmawr railway station operated between 1862 and 1963

== Population ==
Brynmawr had an estimated population of 5,568 in 2020. In 2011, 10% of the population were unemployed.

== Commerce and local economy ==
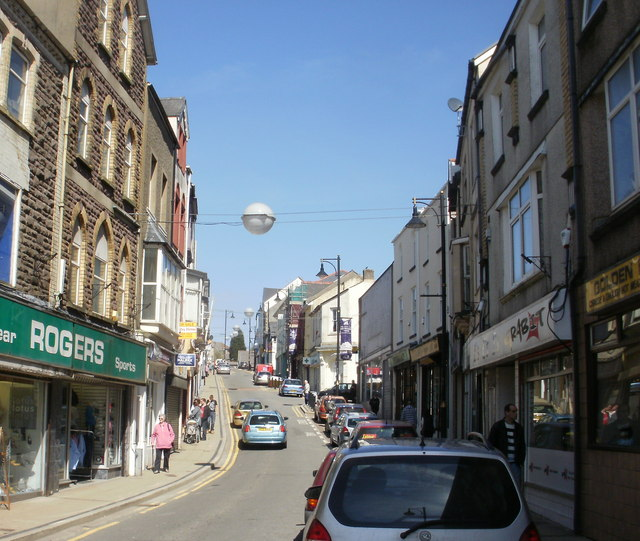
Beaufort Street, the town's main street

The town centre's primary shopping areas are contained within Beaufort Street and on Market Square, which is also the focal point of the town where many events are hosted. The former Market Hall is now a cinema and theatre presenting films and productions from the local amateur operatic society. The business community offers many traditional, family-orientated and independently run shops,. The Tabor Centre, in Davies Street, is a multi-purpose community venue with rooms available for hire. Brynmawr is also home to many artisan food producers who organise the annual Brynmawr Street Food Festival.

== Places of interest ==
Parc Nant y Waun is a nature reserve incorporating 22 hectares (54 acres) of grassland, mires and reservoirs which was officially opened in 2007. Home to many wildlife species, it includes a picnic area, an outdoor classroom, and an angling club.

== Sport and leisure ==
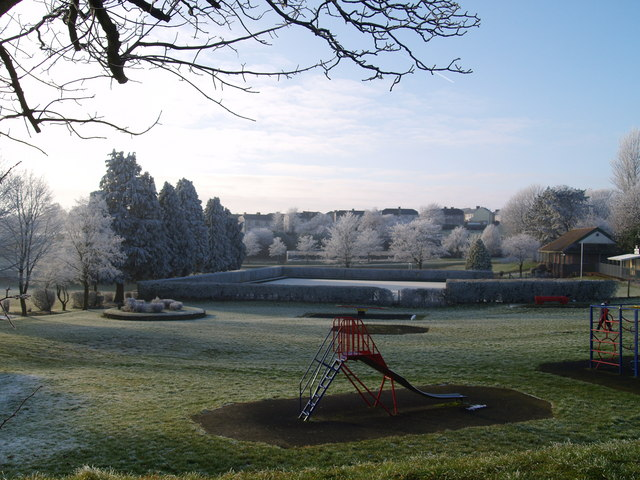
Heavy frost at the park, December 2008

Brynmawr RFC is the local rugby union club which is affiliated to the Dragons RFC in Newport. Brynmawr has a 350-seat cinema (The Market Hall Cinema) which is the longest continually running cinema in Wales.

Notable people include professional wrestlers Adrian Street and Flash Morgan Webster, singer-songwriters Huw and Tony Williams and pop singer-songwriter Marina Diamandis, known professionally as Marina. T. Rowley Jones was President of Welsh Rugby Union, 1977/78.

Wales and Great Britain Rugby League international Roy Francis, who scored 229 tries in 356 top-flight matches and went on to win three National League titles and the 1968 Challenge Cup as a coach of Hull FC and Leeds, was born in the town and played for Brynmawr RFC. A memorial to Francis was inaugurated in the town in October 2023.

== See also ==
- Brynmawr Rubber Factory
- Brynmawr Furniture – Welsh furniture company (active 1930–1940)
- Brynmawr Experiment
- Brynmawr Foundation School
