= List of 1992 British incumbents =

This is a list of 1992 British incumbents.

== Government ==
- Monarch
  - Head of State - Elizabeth II, Queen of the United Kingdom (1952–2022)
- Prime Minister
  - Head of Government - John Major, Prime Minister of the United Kingdom (1990–1997)
- First Lord of the Treasury
  - John Major, First Lord of the Treasury (1990–1997)
- Chancellor of the Exchequer
  - Norman Lamont, Chancellor of the Exchequer (1990–1993)
- Second Lord of the Treasury
  - Norman Lamont, Second Lord of the Treasury (1990–1993)
- Secretary of State for Foreign and Commonwealth Affairs
  - Douglas Hurd, Secretary of State for Foreign and Commonwealth Affairs (1989–1995)
- Secretary of State for the Home Department
  1. Kenneth Baker, Secretary of State for the Home Department (1990–1992)
  2. Kenneth Clarke, Secretary of State for the Home Department (1992–1993)
- Secretary of State for Transport
  1. Malcolm Rifkind, Secretary of State for Transport (1990–1992)
  2. John MacGregor, Secretary of State for Transport (1992–1994)
- Secretary of State for Scotland
  - Ian Lang, Secretary of State for Scotland (1990–1995)
- Secretary of State for Health
  1. William Waldegrave, Secretary of State for Health (1990–1992)
  2. Virginia Bottomley, Secretary of State for Health (1992–1995)
- Secretary of State for Northern Ireland
  1. Peter Brooke, Secretary of State for Northern Ireland (1989–1992)
  2. Sir Patrick Mayhew, Secretary of State for Northern Ireland (1992–1997)
- Secretary of State for Defence
  1. Tom King, Secretary of State for Defence (1989–1992)
  2. Malcolm Rifkind, Secretary of State for Defence (1992–1995)
- Secretary of State for Trade and Industry
  1. Peter Lilley, Secretary of State for Trade and Industry (1990–1992)
  2. Michael Heseltine, Secretary of State for Trade and Industry (1992–1995)
- Secretary of State for National Heritage
  1. David Mellor, Secretary of State for National Heritage (1992)
  2. Peter Brooke, Secretary of State for National Heritage (1992–1994)
- Secretary of State for Education
  1. Kenneth Clarke, Secretary of State for Education and Science (1990–1992)
  2. John Patten, Secretary of State for Education (1992–1994)
- Secretary of State for Wales
  - David Hunt, Secretary of State for Wales (1990–1993)
- Lord Privy Seal
  1. David Waddington, Baron Waddington, Lord Privy Seal (1990–1992)
  2. John Wakeham, Baron Wakeham, Lord Privy Seal (1992–1994)
- Leader of the House of Commons
  1. John MacGregor, Leader of the House of Commons (1990–1992)
  2. Tony Newton, Leader of the House of Commons (1992–1997)
- Lord President of the Council
  1. John MacGregor, Lord President of the Council (1990–1992)
  2. Tony Newton, Lord President of the Council (1992–1997)
- Lord Chancellor
  - James Mackay, Baron Mackay of Clashfern, Lord Chancellor (1987–1997)
- Secretary of State for Social Security
  1. Tony Newton, Secretary of State for Social Security (1989–1992)
  2. Peter Lilley, Secretary of State for Social Security (1992–1997)
- Chancellor of the Duchy of Lancaster
  1. Chris Patten, Chancellor of the Duchy of Lancaster (1990–1992)
  2. William Waldegrave, Chancellor of the Duchy of Lancaster (1992–1994)

== Religion ==
- Archbishop of Canterbury
  - George Carey, Archbishop of Canterbury (1991–2002)
- Archbishop of York
  - John Habgood, Archbishop of York (1983–1995)
