= List of 1993 British incumbents =

This is a list of 1993 British incumbents.

== Government ==
- Monarch
  - Head of State -

Charles III, King of the United Kingdom (2022-present)

Elizabeth II, Queen of the United Kingdom (1952–2022)

- Prime Minister
  - Head of Government - John Major, Prime Minister of the United Kingdom (1990–1997)
- First Lord of the Treasury
  - John Major, First Lord of the Treasury (1990–1997)
- Chancellor of the Exchequer
  1. Norman Lamont, Chancellor of the Exchequer (1990–1993)
  2. Kenneth Clarke, Chancellor of the Exchequer (1993–1997)
- Second Lord of the Treasury
  1. Norman Lamont, Second Lord of the Treasury (1990–1993)
  2. Kenneth Clarke, Second Lord of the Treasury (1993–1997)
- Secretary of State for Foreign and Commonwealth Affairs
  - Douglas Hurd, Secretary of State for Foreign and Commonwealth Affairs (1989–1995)
- Secretary of State for the Home Department
  1. Kenneth Clarke, Secretary of State for the Home Department (1992–1993)
  2. Michael Howard, Secretary of State for the Home Department (1993–1997)
- Secretary of State for Transport
  - John MacGregor, Secretary of State for Transport (1992–1994)
- Secretary of State for Scotland
  - Ian Lang, Secretary of State for Scotland (1990–1995)
- Secretary of State for Health
  - Virginia Bottomley, Secretary of State for Health (1992–1995)
- Secretary of State for Northern Ireland
  - Sir Patrick Mayhew, Secretary of State for Northern Ireland (1992–1997)
- Secretary of State for Defence
  - Malcolm Rifkind, Secretary of State for Defence (1992–1995)
- Secretary of State for Trade and Industry
  - Michael Heseltine, Secretary of State for Trade and Industry (1992–1995)
- Secretary of State for National Heritage
  - Peter Brooke, Secretary of State for National Heritage (1992–1994)
- Secretary of State for Education
  - John Patten, Secretary of State for Education (1992–1994)
- Secretary of State for Wales
  1. David Hunt, Secretary of State for Wales (1990–1993)
  2. John Redwood, Secretary of State for Wales (1993–1995)
- Lord Privy Seal
  - John Wakeham, Baron Wakeham, Lord Privy Seal (1992–1994)
- Leader of the House of Commons
  - Tony Newton, Leader of the House of Commons (1992–1997)
- Lord President of the Council
  - Tony Newton, Lord President of the Council (1992–1997)
- Lord Chancellor
  - James Mackay, Baron Mackay of Clashfern, Lord Chancellor (1987–1997)
- Secretary of State for Social Security
  - Peter Lilley, Secretary of State for Social Security (1992–1997)
- Chancellor of the Duchy of Lancaster
  - William Waldegrave, Chancellor of the Duchy of Lancaster (1992–1994)

== Religion ==
- Archbishop of Canterbury
  - George Carey, Archbishop of Canterbury (1991–2002)
- Archbishop of York
  - John Habgood, Archbishop of York (1983–1995)
