= List of 1997 British incumbents =

This is a list of 1997 British incumbents.

== Government ==
- Monarch
  - Head of State - Elizabeth II, Queen of the United Kingdom (1952–2022)
- Prime Minister
  1. Head of Government - John Major, Prime Minister of the United Kingdom (1990–1997)
  2. Head of Government - Tony Blair, Prime Minister of the United Kingdom (1997–2007)
- First Lord of the Treasury
  1. John Major, First Lord of the Treasury (1990–1997)
  2. Tony Blair, First Lord of the Treasury (1997–2007)
- Chancellor of the Exchequer
  1. Kenneth Clarke, Chancellor of the Exchequer (1993–1997)
  2. Gordon Brown, Chancellor of the Exchequer (1997–2007)
- Second Lord of the Treasury
  1. Kenneth Clarke, Second Lord of the Treasury (1993–1997)
  2. Gordon Brown, Second Lord of the Treasury (1997–2007)
- Secretary of State for Foreign and Commonwealth Affairs
  1. Malcolm Rifkind, Secretary of State for Foreign and Commonwealth Affairs (1995–1997)
  2. Robin Cook, Secretary of State for Foreign and Commonwealth Affairs (1997–2001)
- Secretary of State for the Home Department
  1. Michael Howard, Secretary of State for the Home Department (1993–1997)
  2. Jack Straw, Secretary of State for the Home Department (1997–2001)
- Minister of Agriculture, Fisheries and Food
  1. Douglas Hogg, Minister of Agriculture, Fisheries and Food (1995–1997)
  2. Jack Cunningham, Minister of Agriculture, Fisheries and Food (1997–1998)
- Secretary of State for Environment, Transport and the Regions
  1. Sir George Young, Bt., Secretary of State for Transport (1995–1997)
  2. Gavin Strang, Secretary of State for Environment, Transport and the Regions (1997–1998)
- Secretary of State for Scotland
  1. Michael Forsyth, Secretary of State for Scotland (1995–1997)
  2. Donald Dewar, Secretary of State for Scotland (1997–1999)
- Secretary of State for Health
  1. Stephen Dorrell, Secretary of State for Health (1995–1997)
  2. Frank Dobson, Secretary of State for Health (1997–1999)
- Secretary of State for Northern Ireland
  1. Sir Patrick Mayhew, Secretary of State for Northern Ireland (1992–1997)
  2. Mo Mowlam, Secretary of State for Northern Ireland (1997–1999)
- Secretary of State for Defence
  1. Michael Portillo, Secretary of State for Defence (1995–1997)
  2. Lord Robertson of Port Ellen, Secretary of State for Defence (1997–1999)
- Secretary of State for Trade and Industry
  1. Ian Lang, Secretary of State for Trade and Industry (1995–1997)
  2. Margaret Beckett, Secretary of State for Trade and Industry (1997–1998)
- Secretary of State for Culture, Media and Sport
  1. Virginia Bottomley, Secretary of State for National Heritage (1995–1997)
  2. Chris Smith, Secretary of State for Culture, Media and Sport (1997–2001)
- Secretary of State for Education and Employment
  1. Gillian Shepherd, Secretary of State for Education and Employment (1995–1997)
  2. David Blunkett, Secretary of State for Education and Employment (1997–2001)
- Secretary of State for Wales
  1. William Hague, Secretary of State for Wales (1995–1997)
  2. Ron Davies, Secretary of State for Wales (1997–1998)
- Lord Privy Seal
  1. Robert Gascoyne-Cecil, 7th Marquess of Salisbury, Lord Privy Seal (1994–1997)
  2. Lord Richard, Lord Privy Seal (1997–1998)
- Leader of the House of Commons
  1. Tony Newton, Leader of the House of Commons (1992–1997)
  2. Ann Taylor, Baroness Taylor of Bolton, Leader of the House of Commons (1997–1998)
- Lord President of the Council
  1. Tony Newton, Lord President of the Council (1992–1997)
  2. Ann Taylor, Baroness Taylor of Bolton, Lord President of the Council (1997–1998)
- Lord Chancellor
  1. James Mackay, Baron Mackay of Clashfern, Lord Chancellor (1987–1997)
  2. Derry Irvine, Baron Irvine of Lairg, Lord Chancellor (1997–2003)
- Secretary of State for International Development
  - Clare Short, Secretary of State for International Development (1997–2003)
- Secretary of State for Social Security
  1. Peter Lilley, Secretary of State for Social Security (1992–1997)
  2. Harriet Harman, Secretary of State for Social Security (1997–1998)
- Chancellor of the Duchy of Lancaster
  1. Roger Freeman, Chancellor of the Duchy of Lancaster (1995–1997)
  2. David G. Clark, Chancellor of the Duchy of Lancaster (1997–1998)

== Religion ==
- Archbishop of Canterbury
  - George Carey, Archbishop of Canterbury (1991–2002)
- Archbishop of York
  - David Hope, Archbishop of York (1995–2005)
