= List of 1989 British incumbents =

This is a list of 1989 British incumbents.

== Government ==
- Monarch
  - Head of State – Elizabeth II, Queen of the United Kingdom (1952–2022)
- Prime Minister
  - Head of Government – Margaret Thatcher, Prime Minister of the United Kingdom (1979–1990)
- First Lord of the Treasury
  - Margaret Thatcher, First Lord of the Treasury (1979–1990)
- Chancellor of the Exchequer
  1. Nigel Lawson, Chancellor of the Exchequer (1983–1989)
  2. John Major, Chancellor of the Exchequer (1989–1990)
- Second Lord of the Treasury
  1. Nigel Lawson, Second Lord of the Treasury (1983–1989)
  2. John Major, Second Lord of the Treasury (1989–1990)
- Secretary of State for Foreign and Commonwealth Affairs
  1. Sir Geoffrey Howe, Secretary of State for Foreign and Commonwealth Affairs (1983–1989)
  2. John Major, Secretary of State for Foreign and Commonwealth Affairs (1989)
  3. Douglas Hurd, Secretary of State for Foreign and Commonwealth Affairs (1989–1995)
- Secretary of State for the Home Department
  1. Douglas Hurd, Secretary of State for the Home Department (1985–1989)
  2. David Waddington, Secretary of State for the Home Department (1989–1990)
- Secretary of State for Transport
  1. Paul Channon, Secretary of State for Transport (1987–1989)
  2. Cecil Parkinson, Secretary of State for Transport (1989–1990)
- Secretary of State for Scotland
  - Malcolm Rifkind, Secretary of State for Scotland (1986–1990)
- Secretary of State for Health
  - Kenneth Clarke, Secretary of State for Health (1988–1990)
- Secretary of State for Northern Ireland
  1. Tom King, Secretary of State for Northern Ireland (1985–1989)
  2. Peter Brooke, Secretary of State for Northern Ireland (1989–1992)
- Secretary of State for Defence
  1. George Younger, Secretary of State for Defence (1986–1989)
  2. Tom King, Secretary of State for Defence (1989–1992)
- Secretary of State for Trade and Industry
  1. David Young, Secretary of State for Trade and Industry (1987–1989)
  2. Nicholas Ridley, Secretary of State for Trade and Industry (1989–1990)
- Secretary of State for Education and Science
  1. Kenneth Baker, Secretary of State for Education and Science (1986–1989)
  2. John MacGregor, Secretary of State for Education and Science (1989–1990)
- Secretary of State for Wales
  - Peter Walker, Secretary of State for Wales (1987–1990)
- Lord Privy Seal
  - John Ganzoni, 2nd Baron Belstead, Lord Privy Seal (1988–1990)
- Leader of the House of Commons
  1. John Wakeham, Leader of the House of Commons (1987–1989)
  2. Sir Geoffrey Howe, Leader of the House of Commons (1989–1990)
- Lord President of the Council
  1. John Wakeham, Lord President of the Council (1988–1989)
  2. Sir Geoffrey Howe, Lord President of the Council (1989–1990)
- Lord Chancellor
  - James Mackay, Baron Mackay of Clashfern, Lord Chancellor (1987–1997)
- Secretary of State for Social Security
  1. John Moore, Secretary of State for Social Security (1988–1989)
  2. Tony Newton, Secretary of State for Social Security (1989–1992)
- Chancellor of the Duchy of Lancaster
  1. Tony Newton, Chancellor of the Duchy of Lancaster (1988–1989)
  2. Kenneth Baker, Chancellor of the Duchy of Lancaster (1989–1990)

== Religion ==
- Archbishop of Canterbury
  - Robert Runcie, Archbishop of Canterbury (1980–1991)
- Archbishop of York
  - John Habgood, Archbishop of York (1983–1995)
