= List of 1990 British incumbents =

This is a list of 1990 British incumbents.

== Government ==
- Monarch
  - Head of State – Elizabeth II, Queen of the United Kingdom (1952–2022)

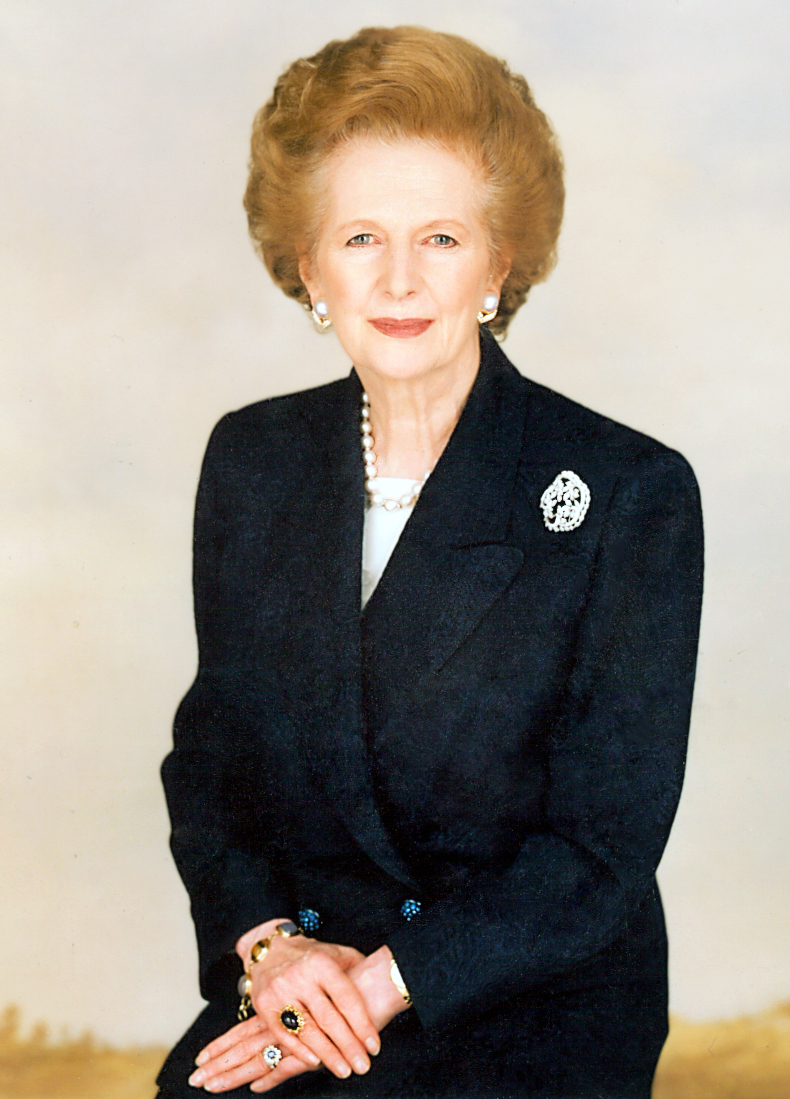
Thatcher (Con) resigns after 11-year tenure.

- Prime Minister
  1. Head of Government – Margaret Thatcher, Prime Minister of the United Kingdom (1979–1990)
  2. Head of Government – John Major, Prime Minister of the United Kingdom (1990–1997)
- First Lord of the Treasury
  1. Margaret Thatcher, First Lord of the Treasury (1979–1990)
  2. John Major, First Lord of the Treasury (1990–1997)
- Chancellor of the Exchequer
  1. John Major, Chancellor of the Exchequer (1989–1990)
  2. Norman Lamont, Chancellor of the Exchequer (1990–1993)
- Second Lord of the Treasury
  1. John Major, Second Lord of the Treasury (1989–1990)
  2. Norman Lamont, Second Lord of the Treasury (1990–1993)
- Secretary of State for Foreign and Commonwealth Affairs
  - Douglas Hurd, Secretary of State for Foreign and Commonwealth Affairs (1989–1995)
- Secretary of State for the Home Department
  1. David Waddington, Secretary of State for the Home Department (1989–1990)
  2. Kenneth Baker, Secretary of State for the Home Department (1990–1992)
- Secretary of State for Transport
  1. Cecil Parkinson, Secretary of State for Transport (1989–1990)
  2. Malcolm Rifkind, Secretary of State for Transport (1990–1992)
- Secretary of State for Scotland
  1. Malcolm Rifkind, Secretary of State for Scotland (1986–1990)
  2. Ian Lang, Secretary of State for Scotland (1990–1995)
- Secretary of State for Health
  1. Kenneth Clarke, Secretary of State for Health (1988–1990)
  2. William Waldegrave, Secretary of State for Health (1990–1992)
- Secretary of State for Northern Ireland
  - Peter Brooke, Secretary of State for Northern Ireland (1989–1992)
- Secretary of State for Defence
  - Tom King, Secretary of State for Defence (1989–1992)
- Secretary of State for Trade and Industry
  1. Nicholas Ridley, Secretary of State for Trade and Industry (1989–1990)
  2. Peter Lilley, Secretary of State for Trade and Industry (1990–1992)
- Secretary of State for Education and Science
  1. John MacGregor, Secretary of State for Education and Science (1989–1990)
  2. Kenneth Clarke, Secretary of State for Education and Science (1990–1992)
- Secretary of State for Wales
  1. Peter Walker, Secretary of State for Wales (1987–1990)
  2. David Hunt, Secretary of State for Wales (1990–1993)
- Lord Privy Seal
  1. John Ganzoni, 2nd Baron Belstead, Lord Privy Seal (1988–1990)
  2. David Waddington, Baron Waddington, Lord Privy Seal (1990–1992)
- Leader of the House of Commons
  1. Sir Geoffrey Howe, Leader of the House of Commons (1989–1990)
  2. John MacGregor, Leader of the House of Commons (1990–1992)
- Lord President of the Council
  1. Sir Geoffrey Howe, Lord President of the Council (1989–1990)
  2. John MacGregor, Lord President of the Council (1990–1992)
- Lord Chancellor
  - James Mackay, Baron Mackay of Clashfern, Lord Chancellor (1987–1997)
- Secretary of State for Social Security
  - Tony Newton, Secretary of State for Social Security (1989–1992)
- Chancellor of the Duchy of Lancaster
  1. Kenneth Baker, Chancellor of the Duchy of Lancaster (1989–1990)
  2. Chris Patten, Chancellor of the Duchy of Lancaster (1990–1992)

== Religion ==
- Archbishop of Canterbury
  - Robert Runcie, Archbishop of Canterbury (1980–1991)
- Archbishop of York
  - John Habgood, Archbishop of York (1983–1995)
