= List of 1995 British incumbents =

This is a list of 1995 British incumbents.

== Government ==
- Monarch
  - Head of State - Elizabeth II, Queen of the United Kingdom (1952–2022)
- Prime Minister
  - Head of Government - John Major, Prime Minister of the United Kingdom (1990–1997)
- First Lord of the Treasury
  - John Major, First Lord of the Treasury (1990–1997)
- Chancellor of the Exchequer
  - Kenneth Clarke, Chancellor of the Exchequer (1993–1997)
- Second Lord of the Treasury
  - Kenneth Clarke, Second Lord of the Treasury (1993–1997)
- Secretary of State for Foreign and Commonwealth Affairs
  1. Douglas Hurd, Secretary of State for Foreign and Commonwealth Affairs (1989–1995)
  2. Malcolm Rifkind, Secretary of State for Foreign and Commonwealth Affairs (1995–1997)
- Secretary of State for the Home Department
  - Michael Howard, Secretary of State for the Home Department (1993–1997)
- Secretary of State for Transport
  1. Brian Mawhinney, Secretary of State for Transport (1994–1995)
  2. Sir George Young, Bt., Secretary of State for Transport (1995–1997)
- Secretary of State for Scotland
  1. Ian Lang, Secretary of State for Scotland (1990–1995)
  2. Michael Forsyth, Secretary of State for Scotland (1995–1997)
- Secretary of State for Health
  1. Virginia Bottomley, Secretary of State for Health (1992–1995)
  2. Stephen Dorrell, Secretary of State for Health (1995–1997)
- Secretary of State for Northern Ireland
  - Sir Patrick Mayhew, Secretary of State for Northern Ireland (1992–1997)
- Secretary of State for Defence
  1. Malcolm Rifkind, Secretary of State for Defence (1992–1995)
  2. Michael Portillo, Secretary of State for Defence (1995–1997)
- Secretary of State for Trade and Industry
  1. Michael Heseltine, Secretary of State for Trade and Industry (1992–1995)
  2. Ian Lang, Secretary of State for Trade and Industry (1995–1997)
- Secretary of State for National Heritage
  1. Stephen Dorrell, Secretary of State for National Heritage (1994–1995)
  2. Virginia Bottomley, Secretary of State for National Heritage (1995–1997)
- Secretary of State for Education and Employment
  1. Gillian Shepherd, Secretary of State for Education (1994–1995)
  2. Gillian Shepherd, Secretary of State for Education and Employment (1995–1997)
- Secretary of State for Wales
  1. John Redwood, Secretary of State for Wales (1993–1995)
  2. David Hunt, Secretary of State for Wales (1995)
  3. William Hague, Secretary of State for Wales (1995–1997)
- Lord Privy Seal
  - Robert Gascoyne-Cecil, 7th Marquess of Salisbury, Lord Privy Seal (1994–1997)
- Leader of the House of Commons
  - Tony Newton, Leader of the House of Commons (1992–1997)
- Lord President of the Council
  - Tony Newton, Lord President of the Council (1992–1997)
- Lord Chancellor
  - James Mackay, Baron Mackay of Clashfern, Lord Chancellor (1987–1997)
- Secretary of State for Social Security
  - Peter Lilley, Secretary of State for Social Security (1992–1997)
- Chancellor of the Duchy of Lancaster
  1. David Hunt, Chancellor of the Duchy of Lancaster (1994–1995)
  2. Roger Freeman, Chancellor of the Duchy of Lancaster (1995–1997)

== Religion ==
- Archbishop of Canterbury
  - George Carey, Archbishop of Canterbury (1991–2002)
- Archbishop of York
  1. John Habgood, Archbishop of York (1983–1995; retired before 8 September)
  2. David Hope, Archbishop of York (1995–2005; installed 8 December)
