= List of 1991 British incumbents =

This is a list of 1991 British incumbents.

== Government ==
- Monarch
  - Head of State – Elizabeth II, Queen of the United Kingdom (1952–2022)
- Prime Minister
  - Head of Government – John Major, Prime Minister of the United Kingdom (1990–1997)
- First Lord of the Treasury
  - John Major, First Lord of the Treasury (1990–1997)
- Chancellor of the Exchequer
  - Norman Lamont, Chancellor of the Exchequer (1990–1993)
- Second Lord of the Treasury
  - Norman Lamont, Second Lord of the Treasury (1990–1993)
- Secretary of State for Foreign and Commonwealth Affairs
  - Douglas Hurd, Secretary of State for Foreign and Commonwealth Affairs (1989–1995)
- Secretary of State for the Home Department
  - Kenneth Baker, Secretary of State for the Home Department (1990–1992)
- Secretary of State for Transport
  - Malcolm Rifkind, Secretary of State for Transport (1990–1992)
- Secretary of State for Scotland
  - Ian Lang, Secretary of State for Scotland (1990–1995)
- Secretary of State for Health
  - William Waldegrave, Secretary of State for Health (1990–1992)
- Secretary of State for Northern Ireland
  - Peter Brooke, Secretary of State for Northern Ireland (1989–1992)
- Secretary of State for Defence
  - Tom King, Secretary of State for Defence (1989–1992)
- Secretary of State for Trade and Industry
  - Peter Lilley, Secretary of State for Trade and Industry (1990–1992)
- Secretary of State for Education
  - Kenneth Clarke, Secretary of State for Education and Science (1990–1992)
- Secretary of State for Wales
  - David Hunt, Secretary of State for Wales (1990–1993)
- Lord Privy Seal
  - David Waddington, Baron Waddington, Lord Privy Seal (1990–1992)
- Leader of the House of Commons
  - John MacGregor, Leader of the House of Commons (1990–1992)
- Lord President of the Council
  - John MacGregor, Lord President of the Council (1990–1992)
- Lord Chancellor
  - James Mackay, Baron Mackay of Clashfern, Lord Chancellor (1987–1997)
- Secretary of State for Social Security
  - Tony Newton, Secretary of State for Social Security (1989–1992)
- Chancellor of the Duchy of Lancaster
  - Chris Patten, Chancellor of the Duchy of Lancaster (1990–1992)

== Religion ==
- Archbishop of Canterbury
  1. Robert Runcie, Archbishop of Canterbury (1980–1991; retired 31 January)
  2. George Carey, Archbishop of Canterbury (1991–2002; installed 19 April)
- Archbishop of York
  - John Stapylton Habgood, Archbishop of York (1983–1995)
