= Iza =

Iza or IZA may refer to:

== Places ==
- Iza, Boyacá, town and municipality in Boyacá Department, Colombia
- Iza, Iran, in Mazandaran Province
- Iza, Spain, in Navarra
- Iža, a village in Slovakia
- Iza, Ukraine, a village in Ukraine
- Iza (river), a river of northern Romania
- Zona da Mata Regional Airport (IATA code IZA), serving Juiz de Fora, Brazil

== Other uses ==
- Iza (singer), Brazilian singer
- IZA (album), by Izabella Scorupco (1991)
- Iza Calzado (born 1982), Filipina actress
- IZA Institute of Labor Economics (IZA), a research institute and academic network headquartered in Bonn, Germany
- Washington Iza (born 1947), Ecuadorian artist

== See also ==
- Itza (disambiguation)
- Izza (disambiguation)
