= Itza =

Itza may refer to:

- Itza people, an ethnic group of Guatemala
- Itzaʼ language, a Mayan language
- Peten Itza kingdom, a 12th- to 17th-century Maya kingdom of the Yucatán Peninsula
- Itza, Navarre, a town in Spain
- Itza Castillo, Nicaraguan beauty pageant titleholder

== See also ==
- Chichen Itza, a Mayan city
- Iza (disambiguation)
- Izza (disambiguation)
- ITSA (disambiguation)
