= ITSA =

ITSA may refer to:

- Indian Telecommunication Service Officers` Association in India
- Insolvency and Trustee Service Australia
- Instituto Tecnológico Superior Aeronáutico in Ecuador
- Intelligent Transportation Society of America, an advocate for Intelligent Transportation Systems in the United States
- Information Technology Services Agency an executive agency of the Department of Social Security in the UK
- ITSA Film Festival (Imagination, Talent, Shorts, Animation) - a Film Festival in Sonora, California
