= Alan Hurst =

Alan Hurst may refer to:

- Alan Hurst (politician) (1945–2023), British politician
- Alan Hurst (cricketer) (born 1950), former Australian cricketer
