= Braintree (constituency) =

UK Parliament constituency (since 1974)

Coordinates: 51.90°N 0.55°E

- County constituency for the House of Commons
- Interactive map of boundaries since 2024
- Location within the East of England
- County: Essex
- Population: 97,840 (2011 census)
- Electorate: 75,662 (March 2020)
- Major settlements: Braintree, Halstead, Great Notley

Current constituency
- Created: 1974
- Member of Parliament: James Cleverly (Conservative)
- Seats: One
- Created from: Maldon

Braintree is a constituency (Note: A county constituency (for the purposes of election expenses and type of returning officer)) in Essex represented in the House of Commons of the UK Parliament since 2015 by James Cleverly, a member of the Conservative Party. (Note: As with all constituencies, the constituency elects one member of parliament (MP) by the first past the post system of election at least every five years.)

Cleverly, a former chairman of the Conservative Party, served as Shadow Secretary of State for Housing, Communities and Local Government until his resignation in August 2026, having previously held several ministerial roles including home secretary, foreign secretary and secretary of state for education.

== Constituency profile ==
The Braintree constituency covers a large area of rural Essex. The largest town is Braintree, with a population of around 43,000. Other settlements include the small town of Halstead and the villages of Great Notley and Sible Hedingham. The area is predominantly agricultural, although Braintree and Halstead have a history of textile manufacturing, particularly silk.

Compared to national averages, residents of the constituency are less likely to be degree-educated but have similar levels of professional employment and slightly higher household income. White people make up 95% of the population. At the local county and district councils, most parts of the constituency are represented by Conservative councillors, although Labour Party councillors were elected in parts of Braintree. Voters in the constituency strongly supported leaving the European Union in the 2016 referendum; an estimated 62% voted in favour of Brexit compared to 52% nationally.

== History ==
The seat was created for the February 1974 general election, largely from the majority of the constituency of Maldon, including the towns of Braintree and Witham. It underwent a major redistribution and change of boundaries for the 2010 general election when Witham was formed as a separate constituency. This resulted in making the seat safer for the Conservatives.

The former Leader of the House Tony Newton held the seat for the Conservatives from its creation in 1974 until 1997 when Alan Hurst defeated Newton to gain the seat for Labour. Brooks Newmark defeated Hurst in 2005 to regain the seat for the Conservatives, and held it until he stood down in 2015, being succeeded by James Cleverly, also a Conservative.

== Boundaries and boundary changes ==
=== Historic ===
==== 1974–1983 ====
- The Urban Districts of Braintree and Bocking, and Witham;
- The Rural District of Braintree; and
- The Rural District of Chelmsford civil parishes of Boreham, Broomfield, Chignall, Good Easter, Great and Little Leighs, Great Waltham, Little Waltham, Mashbury, Pleshey, Roxwell, Springfield, and Writtle.

Formed largely from the existing constituency of Maldon. The northern part of the Rural District of Chelmsford was transferred from Chelmsford and a small part of the Rural District of Braintree was previously in Saffron Walden.

==== 1983–1997 ====
- The District of Braintree wards of Black Notley, Bocking North, Bocking South, Braintree Central, Braintree East, Braintree West, Coggeshall, Cressing, Hatfield Peverel, Kelvedon, Panfield, Rayne, Terling, Three Fields, Witham Central, Witham Chipping Hill, Witham North, Witham Silver End and Rivenhall, Witham South, and Witham West; and
- The Borough of Chelmsford wards of Broomfield and Chignall, Good Easter Mashbury and Roxwell, Great and Little Leighs and Little Waltham, Great Waltham and Pleshey, and Writtle.

Following changes to the structure of local authorities in 1974, the seat was largely unchanged, with just the Boreham and Springfield ward of Chelmsford Borough being transferred to the Chelmsford constituency.

==== 1997–2010 ====
- The District of Braintree wards of Black Notley, Bocking North, Bocking South, Braintree Central, Braintree East, Braintree West, Coggeshall, Cressing, Earls Colne, Gosfield, Hatfield Peveril, Kelvedon, Panfield, Rayne, Terling, Three Fields, Witham Central, Witham Chipping Hill, Witham North, Witham Silver End and Rivenhall, Witham South, and Witham West.

The parts in the Borough of Chelmsford now included in the new constituency of West Chelmsford. Two small wards (Earls Colne and Gosfield) transferred from Saffron Walden.

==== 2010–2024 ====
- The District of Braintree wards of Bocking Blackwater, Bocking North, Bocking South, Braintree Central, Braintree East, Braintree South, Bumpstead, Cressing and Stisted, Gosfield and Greenstead Green, Great Notley and Braintree West, Halstead St Andrews, Halstead Trinity, Hedingham and Maplestead, Panfield, Rayne, Stour Valley North, Stour Valley South, The Three Colnes, Three Fields, Upper Colne, and Yeldham.

The 2010 redistribution saw a major change, with southern and western areas, including the town of Witham, forming the basis of the new County Constituency of Witham. Extended northwards, gaining the District of Braintree wards previously in Saffron Walden, including the town of Halstead.

=== Current ===
Following the 2023 review of Westminster constituencies, which came into effect for the 2024 general election, the composition of the constituency is as follows (as they existed on 1 December 2020):

- The District of Braintree wards of: Bocking Blackwater; Bocking North; Bocking South; Braintree Central & Beckers Green; Braintree South; Braintree West; Bumpstead; Gosfield & Greenstead Green; Great Notley & Black Notley; Halstead St. Andrew's; Halstead Trinity; Hedingham; Rayne; Stour Valley North; Stour Valley South; Three Fields; Yeldham.
- The District of Uttlesford wards of: Felsted & Stebbing; The Sampfords.

Minor changes – the two Uttlesford District wards were transferred from Saffron Walden (renamed North West Essex), offset by a net loss to Witham mainly due to revision of ward boundaries.

== Members of Parliament ==
Election	Member	Party
Feb 1974	Tony Newton	Conservative
1997	Alan Hurst	Labour
2005	Brooks Newmark	Conservative
2015	James Cleverly	Conservative

== Elections ==
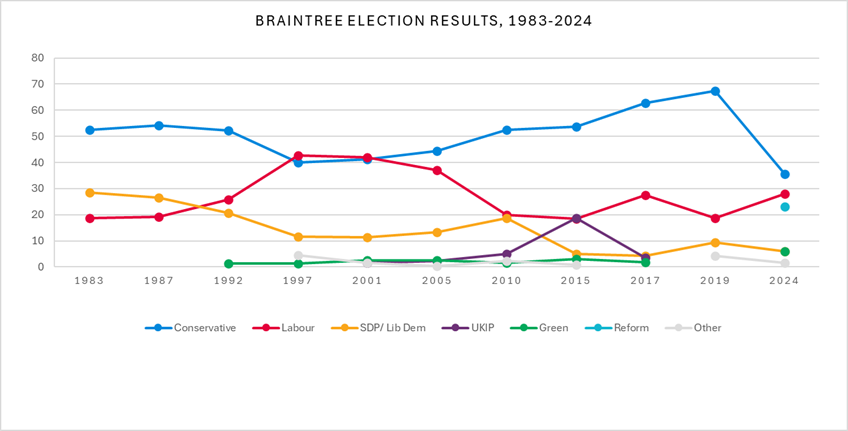
Braintree election results 1983–2024

=== Elections in the 2020s ===
General election 2024: Braintree
Party	Candidate	Votes	%	±%
Conservative	James Cleverly	17,414	35.5	−32.0
Labour	Matthew Wright	13,744	28.0	+9.8
Reform	Richard Thomson	11,346	23.1	New
Liberal Democrats	Kieron Franks	2,879	5.9	−3.8
Green	Paul Thorogood	2,878	5.9	+5.4
Independent	David Heather	767	1.6	New
Majority		3,670	7.5	−41.3
Turnout		49,028	63.0	−5.3
Registered electors		77,781		
Conservative hold		Swing	−20.9	

=== Elections in the 2010s ===
2019 notional result
Party	Vote	%
Conservative	34,863	67.5
Labour	9,397	18.2
Liberal Democrats	5,013	9.7
Others	2,169	4.4
Green	233	0.5
Turnout	51,675	68.3
Electorate	75,662	

General election 2019: Braintree
Party	Candidate	Votes	%	±%
Conservative	James Cleverly	34,112	67.5	+4.7
Labour	Joshua Garfield	9,439	18.7	−8.9
Liberal Democrats	Dominic Graham	4,779	9.5	+5.2
Independent (Green)	Jo Beavis	1,488	2.9	+1.1
Independent	David Mansell	420	0.8	New
Independent	Alan Dorkins	261	0.5	New
Majority		24,673	48.8	+13.6
Turnout		50,499	67.1	−2.4
Conservative hold		Swing	+6.8	

General election 2017: Braintree
Party	Candidate	Votes	%	±%
Conservative	James Cleverly	32,873	62.8	+9.0
Labour	Malcolm Fincken	14,451	27.6	+9.1
Liberal Democrats	Peter Turner	2,251	4.3	−0.6
UKIP	Richard Bingley	1,835	3.5	−15.3
Green	Thomas Pashby	916	1.8	−1.3
Majority		18,422	35.2	+0.2
Turnout		52,326	69.5	+1.1
Conservative hold		Swing	−0.1	

General election 2015: Braintree
Party	Candidate	Votes	%	±%
Conservative	James Cleverly	27,071	53.8	+1.2
UKIP	Richard Bingley	9,461	18.8	+13.8
Labour	Malcolm Fincken	9,296	18.5	−1.4
Liberal Democrats	Matthew Klesel	2,488	4.9	−13.9
Green	Paul Jeater	1,564	3.1	+1.6
Independent	Toby Pereira	295	0.6	New
BNP	Paul Hooks	108	0.2	−2.0
Majority		17,610	35.0	+2.3
Turnout		50,283	68.4	−0.7
Conservative hold		Swing	−6.3	

General election 2010: Braintree
Party	Candidate	Votes	%	±%
Conservative	Brooks Newmark	25,901	52.6	+2.7
Labour	Bill Edwards	9,780	19.9	−10.8
Liberal Democrats	Steve Jarvis	9,247	18.8	+5.2
UKIP	Michael Ford	2,477	5.0	+2.6
BNP	Paul Hooks	1,080	2.2	New
Green	Daisy Blench	718	1.5	−1.5
Majority		16,121	32.7	+25.3
Turnout		49,203	69.1	+4.9
Registered electors		71,162		+1,253
Conservative hold		Swing	+6.7	

2005 notional result
Party	Vote	%
Conservative	22,422	49.9
Labour	13,764	30.7
Liberal Democrats	6,100	13.6
Green	1,308	2.9
UKIP	1,076	2.4
Others	228	0.5
Turnout	44,898	64.2
Electorate	69,909	

=== Elections in the 2000s ===
General election 2005: Braintree
Party	Candidate	Votes	%	±%
Conservative	Brooks Newmark	23,597	44.5	+3.2
Labour	Alan Hurst	19,704	37.1	−4.9
Liberal Democrats	Peter Turner	7,037	13.3	+2.0
Green	James Abbott	1,308	2.5	0.0
UKIP	Roger Lord	1,181	2.2	+0.7
Independent	Michael Nolan	228	0.4	New
Majority		3,893	7.4	N/A
Turnout		53,055	65.9	+2.3
Conservative gain from Labour		Swing	+4.0	

General election 2001: Braintree
Party	Candidate	Votes	%	±%
Labour	Alan Hurst	21,123	42.0	−0.7
Conservative	Brooks Newmark	20,765	41.3	+1.2
Liberal Democrats	Peter Turner	5,664	11.3	−0.3
Green	James Abbott	1,241	2.5	+1.2
Legalise Cannabis	Michael Nolan	774	1.5	New
UKIP	Charles Cole	748	1.5	New
Majority		358	0.7	−1.9
Turnout		50,315	63.6	−12.5
Labour hold		Swing	−0.9	

=== Elections in the 1990s ===
General election 1997: Braintree
Party	Candidate	Votes	%	±%
Labour	Alan Hurst	23,729	42.7	+17.0
Conservative	Tony Newton	22,278	40.1	−12.2
Liberal Democrats	Trevor K. Ellis	6,418	11.6	−9.1
Referendum	Nicholas P. Westcott	2,165	3.9	New
Green	James Abbott	712	1.3	0.0
Independent	Michael Nolan	274	0.5	New
Majority		1,451	2.6	N/A
Turnout		55,576	76.1	−7.3
Labour gain from Conservative		Swing	+14.6	

General election 1992: Braintree
Party	Candidate	Votes	%	±%
Conservative	Tony Newton	34,415	52.3	−1.9
Labour	Ian Willmore	16,921	25.7	+6.4
Liberal Democrats	Diana P. Wallis	13,603	20.7	−5.8
Green	James Abbott	855	1.3	New
Majority		17,494	26.6	−1.1
Turnout		65,794	83.4	+4.3
Conservative hold		Swing	+4.1	

=== Elections in the 1980s ===
General election 1987: Braintree
Party	Candidate	Votes	%	±%
Conservative	Tony Newton	32,978	54.2	+1.6
SDP (Liberal)	Inigo Bing	16,121	26.5	−2.1
Labour	Brian Stapleton	11,764	19.3	+0.5
Majority		16,857	27.7	+3.7
Turnout		60,863	79.1	+2.9
Conservative hold		Swing	+1.9	

General election 1983: Braintree
Party	Candidate	Votes	%	±%
Conservative	Tony Newton	29,462	52.6	+0.6
SDP (Liberal)	Inigo Bing	16,021	28.6	+12.0
Labour	Janet Dyson	10,551	18.8	−12.6
Majority		13,441	24.0	+3.4
Turnout		56,034	76.2	−4.7
Conservative hold		Swing	−14.0	

=== Elections in the 1970s ===
General election 1979: Braintree
Party	Candidate	Votes	%	±%
Conservative	Tony Newton	31,593	52.0	+12.5
Labour	J.E.B. Gyford	19,075	31.4	−6.0
Liberal	J. Bryan	10,115	16.6	−6.5
Majority		12,518	20.6	+18.5
Turnout		60,783	80.9	+1.5
Conservative hold		Swing	+9.3	

General election October 1974: Braintree
Party	Candidate	Votes	%	±%
Conservative	Tony Newton	20,559	39.5	+1.5
Labour	Keith Kyle	19,469	37.4	+3.1
Liberal	Richard Holme	12,004	23.1	−4.7
Majority		1,090	2.1	−1.6
Turnout		52,032	79.4	−4.9
Conservative hold		Swing	−0.8	

General election February 1974: Braintree
Party	Candidate	Votes	%	±%
Conservative	Tony Newton	20,797	38.0	–11.1
Labour	Keith Kyle	18,796	34.3	–7.1
Liberal	D. Scott	15,204	27.8	+18.1
Majority		2,001	3.7	–4.0
Turnout		54,797	84.3	+5.5
Registered electors		64,975		+6,982
Conservative hold		Swing	–2.0	

1970 notional result
Party	Vote	%
Conservative	22,400	49.0
Labour	18,900	41.4
Liberal	4,400	9.6
Turnout	45,700	78.8
Electorate	57,993	

== See also ==
- List of parliamentary constituencies in Essex
