= John Whittingdale =

British politician (born 1959)

The Right Honourable Sir John Whittingdale OBE MP
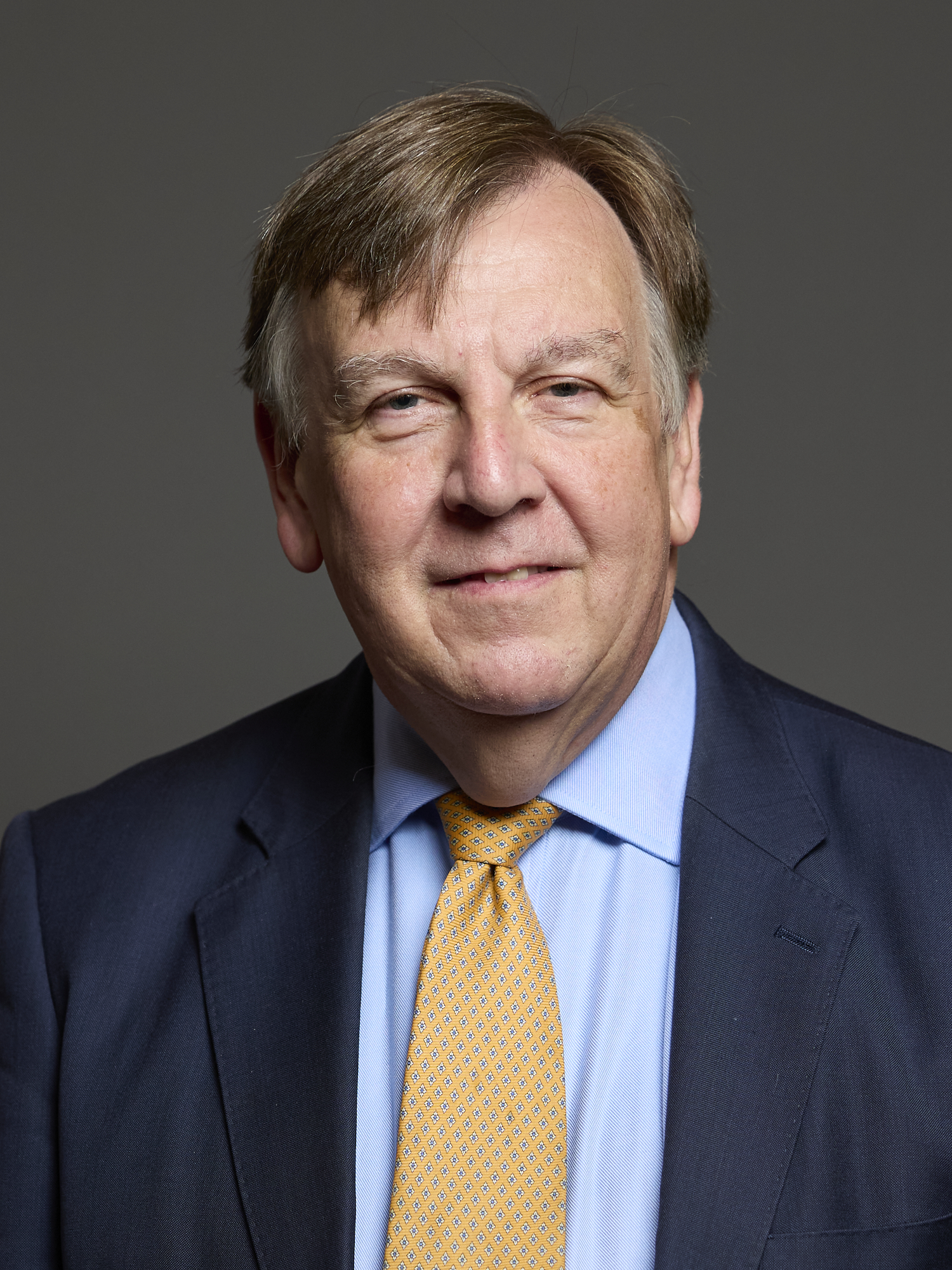
- Official portrait, 2024

Minister of State for Data and Digital Infrastructure
- In office 9 May 2023 – 20 December 2023 (Note: In accordance with the Ministerial and other Maternity Allowances Act 2021 Whittingdale temporarily served during Lopez's maternity leave.)
- Prime Minister: Rishi Sunak
- Preceded by: Julia Lopez
- Succeeded by: Julia Lopez

Minister of State for Media, Tourism and Creative Industries (Note: Minister of State for Media and Data (2020–2021))
- In office 9 May 2023 – 20 December 2023
- Prime Minister: Rishi Sunak
- Preceded by: Julia Lopez
- Succeeded by: Julia Lopez
- In office 14 February 2020 – 16 September 2021
- Prime Minister: Boris Johnson
- Preceded by: Nigel Adams
- Succeeded by: Julia Lopez

Secretary of State for Culture, Media and Sport
- In office 11 May 2015 – 13 July 2016
- Prime Minister: David Cameron
- Preceded by: Sajid Javid
- Succeeded by: Karen Bradley

Chair of the Culture, Media and Sport Committee
- In office 14 July 2005 – 11 May 2015
- Preceded by: Gerald Kaufman
- Succeeded by: Jesse Norman
Shadow cabinet posts
Shadow Secretary of State for Culture, Media and Sport
In office 19 June 2004 – 6 May 2005
Leader	Michael Howard
Preceded by	Julie Kirkbride
Succeeded by	Theresa May
In office 23 July 2002 – 6 November 2003
Leader	Iain Duncan Smith
Preceded by	Tim Yeo
Succeeded by	Julie Kirkbride
Shadow Secretary of State for Trade and Industry
In office 18 September 2001 – 23 July 2002
Leader	Iain Duncan Smith
Preceded by	David Heathcoat-Amory
Succeeded by	Tim Yeo

Member of Parliament
- Incumbent
- Assumed office 9 April 1992
- Preceded by: John Wakeham
- Constituency: Colchester South and Maldon (1992–1997); Maldon and East Chelmsford (1997–2010); Maldon (2010–present)
- Majority: 6,906 (13.9%)

Political Secretary to the Prime Minister of the United Kingdom
- In office 1988–1990
- Prime Minister: Margaret Thatcher
- Preceded by: Stephen Sherbourne
- Succeeded by: Judith Chaplin

Shadow Minister for Health and Social Care
- In office 19 July 2024 – 6 November 2024
- Leader: Rishi Sunak

Personal details
- Born: 16 October 1959 (age 66) Sherborne, Dorset, England
- Party: Conservative
- Spouse: Ancilla Murfitt (m. 1990, divorced)
- Children: 2
- Education: University College London

Sir John Flasby Lawrance Whittingdale (born 16 October 1959) is a British Conservative Party politician who has been the Member of Parliament (MP) for Maldon (and its predecessors) since 1992 and Shadow Minister for Health and Social Care since July 2024. He previously served as Culture Secretary from 2015 to 2016. Whittingdale was most recently Minister of State for Media, Tourism and Creative Industries and Minister of State for Data and Digital Infrastructure from May to December 2023, during the maternity leave of Julia Lopez.

Whittingdale has been an MP since the 1992 general election, for a series of constituencies centred on the town of Maldon, Essex. He was vice-chairman of the 1922 Committee. He was a member of the Executive of Conservative Way Forward (2005–2010) and the Conservative Party Board (2006–2010).

Whittingdale served as Chairman of the Culture, Media and Sport Committee from 2005 to 2015. He was appointed Secretary of State for Culture, Media and Sport by Prime Minister David Cameron in May 2015. He was one of the six Cabinet ministers to come out in favour of Brexit during the 2016 EU referendum and was afterwards a supporter of the Eurosceptic campaign Leave Means Leave. He was dismissed in July 2016 by incoming-Prime Minister Theresa May.

== Early life and career ==
John Whittingdale was born on 16 October 1959, in Sherborne, Dorset. He is the only son of John Whittingdale FRCS (1894–1974) and Margaret Esme Scott (1920–), née Napier. On his mother's side, Whittingdale is in distant remainder to the lordship of Napier.

Whittingdale attended Sandroyd School and Winchester College. In 1982, he took a BEc with a 2:2 from University College London (UCL) where he was chairman of UCL Conservative Society.

From 1982 to 1984, Whittingdale was head of the political section of the Conservative Research Department. He then served as Special Adviser to three successive Secretaries of State for Trade and Industry, Norman Tebbit (1984–1985); Leon Brittan (1985–1986), and Paul Channon (1986–1987). He worked on international privatisation at NM Rothschild in 1987 and in January 1988, became Political Secretary to Prime Minister Margaret Thatcher. Upon her resignation Whittingdale was appointed Order of the British Empire and continued to serve as her Political Secretary until being elected to Parliament in 1992.

== Parliamentary career ==
At the 1992 general election, Whittingdale was elected as MP for South Colchester and Maldon with 54.8% of the vote and a majority of 21,821. After the election, he was appointed parliamentary private secretary to Eric Forth, Minister of State for Education and Employment, but resigned after voting against the Government for an amendment that would have allowed media publishers with more than a 20% share of the national press market to buy an ITV company.

Prior to the 1997 general election, Whittingdale's constituency of South Colchester and Maldon was abolished and replaced with Maldon and East Chelmsford. Whittingdale was elected at the 1997 general election as MP for Maldon and East Chelmsford with 48.7% of the vote and a majority of 10,039. In 1999, Whittingdale became parliamentary private secretary to the Leader of the Opposition, succeeding David Lidington.

At the 2001 general election, Whittingdale was re-elected as MP for Maldon and East Chelmsford with an increased vote share of 49.2% and a decreased majority of 8,462. He was again re-elected at the 2005 general election, with an increased vote share of 51.5% and an increased majority of 12,573.

Prior to the 2010 general election, Whittingdale's constituency of Maldon and East Chelmsford was abolished and replaced with Maldon. At the general election, Whittingdale was elected as MP for Maldon with 59.8% of the vote and a majority of 19,407.

In April 2011 Whittingdale called for a public inquiry into phone hacking at the News of the World and to why a series of investigations by Scotland Yard failed to link any News International employees to phone hacking other than the News of the World's former royal editor, Clive Goodman. Whittingdale said: "There are some very big questions; what I find [most] worrying is the apparent unwillingness of the police, who had the evidence and chose to do nothing with it. That's something that needs to be looked into."

In 2012, Whittingdale was Chairman of the Joint Parliamentary Committee on Privacy and Injunctions. From 2012 to 2019 he was Vice Chair of the All Party Parliamentary Intellectual Property Group.

Whittingdale was among the 175 MPs who voted against the Same-sex Marriage Bill in 2013.

In 2014, Whittingdale along with six other Conservative MPs voted against the Equal Pay (Transparency) Bill which would require all companies with more than 250 employees to declare the gap in pay between the average male and average female salaries.

At the 2015 general election, Whittingdale was re-elected as MP for Maldon with an increased vote share of 60.6% and an increased majority of 22,070.

Whittingdale was in favour of Brexit during the 2016 EU membership referendum. Following the referendum, he was one of several Conservative MPs who signed a letter to Prime Minister Theresa May urging that the UK withdraw from both the European single market and the Customs Union. After the referendum, Whittingdale was a supporter of the Eurosceptic campaign Leave Means Leave.

At the snap 2017 general election, Whittingdale was again re-elected with an increased vote share of 67.9% and an increased majority of 23,430. He was again re-elected at the 2019 general election with an increased vote share of 72% and an increased majority of 30,041. Whittingdale was again re-elected at the 2024 general election, with a decreased vote share of 38.9% and a decreased majority of 6,906. In a debate with the UK Parliament House of Commons in March 2024, Whittingdale expressed support for the Armenian refugees from Nagorno-Karabakh, citing the “humanitarian need to support refugees”, as well as supporting for closer relations with Armenia.

=== Media Select Committee ===
On 14 July 2005 Whittingdale became the chairman of the Culture, Media and Sport Select Committee. In this role he led the committee's investigation in 2009 and 2010 into libel and privacy issues, including the News International phone hacking scandal after The Guardian first revealed the extent of the practice at the News of the World. He was alleged to have warned members of the committee to consider not compelling former News of the World editor Rebekah Brooks to testify due to the potential risk that their personal lives would be investigated in revenge, but has strongly denied the accusation.

With just one out of three of News International's senior executives agreeing to appear before the committee session on 19 July, Whittingdale took the rarely used step of issuing a summons to compel the Murdochs to attend. Whittingdale said Select Committees had taken such steps against individuals in the past and they had complied and continued "I hope very much that the Murdochs will respond similarly." They both did, on 19 July, in what one paper described as the most important Select Committee hearing in parliamentary history.

For its successful work on the phone hacking scandal, Whittingdale accepted The Spectator's 2011 "Inquisitor of the Year" award on behalf of the Culture, Media and Sport Select Committee.

He is played by Patrick Baladi in the 2025 ITV drama about the hacking scandal, The Hack.

=== Culture Secretary ===
Whittingdale was appointed Secretary of State for Culture, Media and Sport by Prime Minister David Cameron on 11 May 2015. He was sworn in to the Privy Council following his appointment.

In April 2016, Shadow Culture Secretary Maria Eagle called for Whittingdale to recuse himself from decisions regarding the outcome of the Leveson Inquiry into press ethics because the story about Whittingdale's former girlfriend being a sex worker exposed him to pressure from the press. A week later, it emerged that Whittingdale had accepted hospitality from the Lap Dancing Association in about 2008 at which time Whittingdale and two other MPs visited two clubs in one evening, while the industry's licensing was under investigation by the Culture, Media and Sport Select Committee. The hospitality was not declared in the Register of members' interests, or later when Whittingdale later spoke out in the Commons against new regulations introduced by the Labour Government.

On 14 July 2016, Whittingdale was dismissed from his position as Culture Secretary by the new prime minister, Theresa May.

In July 2016, shortly after his dismissal, The Guardian criticised Whittingdale over his decision to turn down a request from the Daily Mirror for the release of historic documents relating to Mark Thatcher's dealings with the government of Oman in the 1980s. Roy Greenslade wrote that few, "apart from the man himself and his friends", could disagree with the argument that the public had a right to know.

Whittingdale returned to the DCMS in February 2020, but as a minister of state rather than secretary of state. He was the minister of state for media and data. Having left the department in 2021, Whittingdale once again returned to DCMS in May 2023, being appointed Acting Minister of State for Media, Tourism and Creative Industries, as well as Minister of State at the Department for Science, Innovation and Technology, effective when Julia Lopez took maternity leave.

== Personal life ==
In 1990, Whittingdale married Ancilla Campbell Murfitt, a nurse and school governor. They had two children before their divorce. Whittingdale's half-brother is Charles Napier, former treasurer of the defunct Paedophile Information Exchange, who was most recently convicted of child sexual abuse offences in November 2014.

On 12 April 2016, British media reported Whittingdale had been involved in a relationship with a female sex worker between August 2013 and February 2014. In a statement to the BBC's Newsnight programme, he said he had been unaware of his girlfriend's true occupation after meeting her through Match.com, and that he had ended the relationship after he had discovered it through reports that the story was being offered for publication to tabloids. On 13 April 2016, David Cameron's spokesman said, "John Whittingdale's view was that this was in the past, and had been dealt with."

Whittingdale is a member of the Church of England.

== Honours ==
- United Kingdom:
  - 21 December 1990: Appointed Officer of the Order of the British Empire (OBE) in the 1990 Resignation Honours
  - 14 May 2015: Appointed to the Privy Council of the United Kingdom, giving him the honorific prefix "The Right Honourable" for life
  - 14 October 2022: Appointed a Knight Bachelor in the 2022 Special Honours
- Ukraine:
  - 2019: Third Class of the Order of Merit of Ukraine

== Notes ==
Government offices
Preceded by Stephen Sherbourne	Political Secretary to the Prime Minister; 1988–1990	Succeeded by Judith Chaplin
Parliament of the United Kingdom
Preceded by John Wakeham	Member of Parliament for South Colchester and Maldon; 1992–1997	Constituency abolished
Constituency established	Member of Parliament for Maldon and East Chelmsford; 1997–2010	Constituency abolished
Constituency established	Member of Parliament for Maldon; 2010–present	Incumbent
Political offices
Preceded by David Lidington	Parliamentary private secretary to the Leader of the Opposition; 1999–2001	Succeeded by Owen Paterson
Preceded by David Heathcoat-Amory	Shadow Secretary of State for Trade and Industry; 2001–2002	Succeeded by Tim Yeo
Preceded by Tim Yeo	Shadow Secretary of State for Culture, Media and Sport; 2002–2003	Succeeded by Julie Kirkbride
Preceded by Julie Kirkbride	Shadow Secretary of State for Culture, Media and Sport; 2004–2005	Succeeded by Theresa May
Preceded by Sajid Javid	Secretary of State for Culture, Media and Sport; 2015–2016	Succeeded by Karen Bradley
Preceded by Nigel Adams as Minister of State for Sport, Media and Creative Industries	Minister of State for Media and Data; 2020–2021	Succeeded by Julia Lopez
