= South Colchester and Maldon =

UK Parliament constituency (1983–1997)

- Former county constituency for the House of Commons
- South Colchester and Maldon, showing boundaries used from 1983–1997
- County: Essex

1983–1997
- Seats: One
- Created from: Colchester and Maldon
- Replaced by: Maldon and East Chelmsford, North Essex, Colchester

South Colchester and Maldon was a parliamentary constituency in Essex represented in the House of Commons of the Parliament of the United Kingdom from 1983 to 1997. It elected one Member of Parliament (MP) by the first past the post system of election.

== History ==
This seat was created for the 1983 general election from parts of the abolished Colchester constituency and parts of the Maldon constituency. It was abolished at the next redistribution which came into effect for the 1997 general election, when Colchester was re-established as a borough constituency and new county constituencies of Maldon and East Chelmsford and North Essex were created.

It was a safe Conservative seat throughout its existence.

== Boundaries ==
- The Borough of Colchester wards of Berechurch, Birch-Messing, East Donyland, Harbour, New Town, Prettygate, Pyefleet, Shrub End, Tiptree, West Mersea, and Winstree; and
- The District of Maldon.

The constituency was formed from the bulk of the abolished Maldon constituency (the District of Maldon) and southern parts of the Borough of Colchester (including parts of the town of Colchester) which were previously part of the abolished county constituency of Colchester.

The seat was abolished in 1997, with the parts of the town being included in the re-established constituency of Colchester and remaining areas of the Borough of Colchester being included in the new constituency of North Essex, a seat surrounding Colchester. The District of Maldon formed the basis of the new constituency of Maldon and East Chelmsford.

== Members of Parliament ==
Election	Member	Party
1983	John Wakeham	Conservative
1992	John Whittingdale	Conservative
1997	constituency abolished: see Maldon and East Chelmsford, North Essex and Colchester	

== Elections ==
=== Elections in the 1980s ===
General election 1983: South Colchester and Maldon
Party	Candidate	Votes	%	±%
Conservative	John Wakeham	31,296	53.6	−1.4
SDP	John William Stevens	19,131	32.8	+17.4
Labour	Hilary Barnard	7,932	13.6	−16.0
Majority		12,165	20.8	−4.6
Turnout		58,359	73.3	−3.9
Conservative win (new seat)				

General election 1987: South Colchester and Maldon
Party	Candidate	Votes	%	±%
Conservative	John Wakeham	34,894	54.9	+1.3
SDP	John William Stevens	19,411	30.6	−2.2
Labour	Sally Bigwood	9,229	14.5	+0.9
Majority		15,483	24.4	+3.6
Turnout		63,534	76.2	+2.9
Conservative hold		Swing	+1.8	

=== Elections in the 1990s ===
General election 1992: South Colchester and Maldon
Party	Candidate	Votes	%	±%
Conservative	John Whittingdale	37,548	54.8	−0.1
Liberal Democrats	I L Thorn	15,727	23.0	−7.6
Labour	C A Pearson	14,158	20.7	+6.2
Green	M Patterson	1,028	1.5	New
Majority		21,821	31.9	+7.5
Turnout		68,461	79.2	+3.0
Conservative hold		Swing	+3.8	

=== 1979 Prediction for Colchester South and Maldon boundaries ===
General election 1979: South Colchester and Maldon
Party	Candidate	Votes	%	±%
Conservative	John Wakeham	33,163	55.0	
Labour		17,863	29.6	
Liberal		9,262	15.4	
Majority		15,300	25.4	
Turnout		60,287	77.2	
Conservative hold		Swing		

== Boundary changes ==
Preceded by Colchester	UK Parliament constituency 1983–1997	Succeeded by North Essex
Preceded by Maldon	UK Parliament constituency 1983–1997	Succeeded by Maldon and East Chelmsford
