= Emma Gilthorpe =

British business executive

- Born: Charlotte Emma Tiffany Gilthorpe; 1970 (age 55–56)
- Education: Leicester Polytechnic
- Occupation: Business executive
- Title: CEO, Royal Mail
- Term: May 2024 - June 2025
- Relatives: Tony Newton (stepfather)

Charlotte Emma Tiffany Gilthorpe (born 1970) is a British business executive. She was the CEO of the Royal Mail group from May 2024 until June 2025.

== Early life ==
She was educated at Leicester Polytechnic. She has a brother and a sister. In 1986, her mother Patricia Gilthorpe married the Conservative politician Tony Newton, Baron Newton of Braintree.

== Career ==
She is a barrister, and was called to the bar in July 1996.

Gilthorpe worked in the telecoms industry, with BT Group and Cable & Wireless plc, and joined Heathrow Airport in 2009.

She became COO of Heathrow Airport in 2020. In March 2021, she was appointed CEO of the Jet Zero Council, a UK trade body.
