= Keith Kyle =

British writer, broadcaster and historian (1925–2007)

Keith Kyle (4 August 1925 – 21 February 2007) was a British writer, broadcaster and historian.

== Early life ==
Kyle was educated at Bromsgrove School and Magdalen College, Oxford University, where his period as an undergraduate was broken by war service.

== Career ==
He worked for the BBC North American Service as a talks producer, succeeding Tony Benn in 1951. In 1953, he joined The Economist and was sent to Washington; later he was reporter for the BBC's Tonight programme from 1960, specialising in coverage of Africa and based in Nairobi. He also contributed to The Observer and The Spectator at this time, and covered Rhodesia in the period before Ian Smith's government made their Unilateral Declaration of Independence.

From the late 1960s, Kyle began an academic career, while remaining active as a journalist for some years. He was a Fellow of the John F. Kennedy Institute of Politics at Harvard University (1967–68) and joined Chatham House in 1972, where he remained for 30 years. In the late 1980s, St Antony's College, Oxford invited him to become an associate member. His history, Suez: Britain's End of Empire in the Middle East (Weidenfeld & Nicolson) first appeared in 1991, and is regarded as definitive in almost all the cited articles. His other books include The Politics of the Independence of Kenya (Macmillan) in 1999 and his posthumous autobiography Keith Kyle: Reporting the World appeared in June 2009, published by I.B.Tauris.

== Parliamentary candidacies ==
Kyle had a chequered career as a parliamentary candidate. He had hoped to become a Conservative candidate in the 1955 general election, but government policy on Suez (leading to the Suez Crisis) dissuaded him. He was an unsuccessful Labour Party candidate in St Albans in the 1966 election, for Braintree in both 1974 elections and later was the Social Democratic Party (SDP) candidate for Northampton South in the 1983 election.
