= Zuasti =

Village in Navarre, Spain

Coordinates: 42°51′13″N 1°44′43″W

Zuasti is a residential area located in Navarre. It belongs to the municipality of Iza where it has its city council. The village is located 10.9 km away from Pamplona, the capital of the province. From Zuasti, you can reach Pamplona either with the public bus (several bus stops within the city of Pamplona) or by car. You can also follow bike routes. Zuasti is also 45 minutes away from the beaches in the province of Guipuzcoa and one hour and half from the ski slopes of Astún, Candanchú o Formigal. France is also an hour away.

According to the 2019 report from the INE (Spanish national statistics institute, INE in Spanish) it has 487 inhabitants registered with an average income of 34.207,81 surpassing every other area in Navarre.

Currently, there are two residential areas within the village: Zuasti and Larrache. Additionally, the village holds a country club called Club de Campo Señorio de Zuasti that has an 18-hole golf course, tennis and padel courts, a soccer/rugby field, indoor and outdoor pools, a txikipark, a large oak grove and wood cabins for kids' camps. There is also a public nursery school, a historical church (Iglesia de San Andrés) and a rest area that serves the Autopista de Navarra (AP-15). Its most famous building is the Zuasti Palace from the XV century that was restored at the end of the 20th century. At present, is home to a bar, restaurant and the social club.

The local festivities are held on the weekend closest to September 29th and they honor its saint patron San Miguel. The fiestas include the launch of the Txupinazo, lunch cooked by the different parties in the oak grove followed by music until late at night. People of all ages participate in the celebrations. A small fair is installed for a couple of weeks as well as inflatable castles.
