= Maldon and East Chelmsford =

UK Parliament constituency (1997–2010)

Coordinates: 51.72°N 0.70°E

- Former county constituency for the House of Commons
- Boundary of Maldon and East Chelmsford in Essex for the 2005 general election

- Location of Essex within England
- County: Essex
- Major settlements: Maldon, Danbury and Great Baddow

1997–2010
- Seats: One
- Created from: Chelmsford, Colchester South and Maldon
- Replaced by: Chelmsford, Maldon, Witham

Maldon and East Chelmsford was a parliamentary constituency represented in the House of Commons of the Parliament of the United Kingdom. From 1997 to 2010 it elected one Member of Parliament (MP) by the first past the post system of election.

== History ==
This seat was created for the 1997 general election from parts of the abolished constituencies of South Colchester and Maldon and Chelmsford. It was abolished at the next redistribution which came into effect for the 2010 general election, when the Chelmsford and Maldon constituencies were re-established.

It was a safe Conservative seat throughout its existence.

== Boundaries ==
- The District of Maldon; and
- The Borough of Chelmsford wards of Baddow Road and Great Baddow Village, Galleywood, Little Baddow, Danbury and Sandon, Rothmans, and Woodham Ferrers and Bicknacre.

The constituency was formed from the bulk of the abolished South Colchester and Maldon constituency (the District of Maldon) and eastern parts of the abolished constituency of Chelmsford, including eastern suburbs of the City of Chelmsford (Great Baddow and Galleywood).

Following their review into parliamentary representation in Essex, the Boundary Commission for England abolished the Maldon and East Chelmsford constituency for the 2010 general election. The majority of the constituency, including Maldon and Burnham-on-Crouch, was incorporated into the re-established constituency of Maldon; northern areas were added to the new constituency of Witham; and the Chelmsford suburbs of Great Baddow and Galleywood were included in the re-established constituency of Chelmsford (now a Borough Constituency). This resulted in Maldon District being split between constituencies for the first time.

== Members of Parliament ==
Election	Member	Party
1997	John Whittingdale	Conservative
2010	Constituency abolished: see Maldon and Witham	

== Elections ==
=== Elections in the 1990s ===
General election 1997: Maldon and East Chelmsford
Party	Candidate	Votes	%	±%
Conservative	John Whittingdale	24,524	48.7	
Labour	Kevin Freeman	14,485	28.8	
Liberal Democrats	Graham Pooley	9,758	19.4	
UKIP	Leonard Overy-Owen	935	1.9	
Green	Eleanor Burgess	685	1.4	
Majority		10,039	19.9	
Turnout		50,387	77.9	
Conservative win (new seat)				

=== Elections in the 2000s ===
General election 2001: Maldon and East Chelmsford
Party	Candidate	Votes	%	±%
Conservative	John Whittingdale	21,719	49.2	+0.7
Labour	Russell Kennedy	13,257	30.1	+1.4
Liberal Democrats	Jane Jackson	7,002	15.9	−3.5
UKIP	Geoffrey Harris	1,135	2.6	+0.7
Green	Walter Schwarz	987	2.2	+0.8
Majority		8,462	19.1	−0.8
Turnout		44,100	62.8	−15.1
Conservative hold		Swing		

General election 2005: Maldon and East Chelmsford
Party	Candidate	Votes	%	±%
Conservative	John Whittingdale	23,732	51.5	+2.3
Labour	Sue Tibballs	11,159	24.2	−5.9
Liberal Democrats	Matthew Lambert	9,270	20.1	+4.2
UKIP	Jesse Pryke	1,930	4.2	+1.6
Majority		12,573	27.3	+8.2
Turnout		46,091	66.3	+3.5
Conservative hold		Swing	+4.1	

== See also ==
- List of parliamentary constituencies in Essex
