= Brooks Newmark =

American–British politician (born 1958)

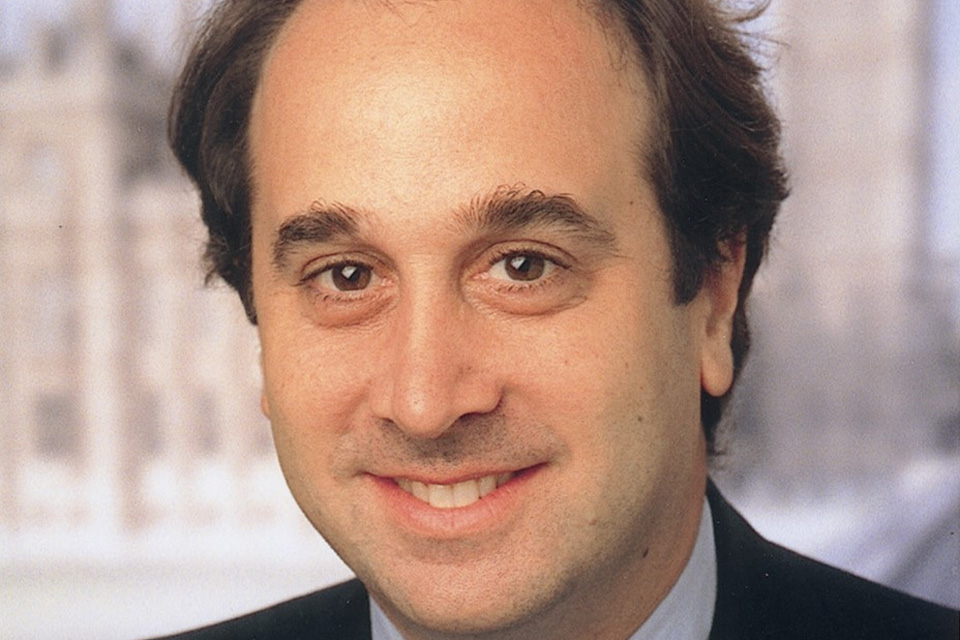
- Newmark in 2014

Minister for Civil Society
- In office 15 July 2014 – 27 September 2014
- Prime Minister: David Cameron
- Preceded by: Nick Hurd
- Succeeded by: Rob Wilson

Lord Commissioner of the Treasury
- In office 6 May 2010 – 4 September 2012
- Prime Minister: David Cameron
- Preceded by: Frank Roy
- Succeeded by: David Evennett

Member of Parliament for Braintree
- In office 5 May 2005 – 30 March 2015
- Preceded by: Alan Hurst
- Succeeded by: James Cleverly

Personal details
- Born: Brooks Phillip Victor Newmark; 8 May 1958 (age 68) Westport, Connecticut, U.S.
- Party: Conservative
- Spouse: Lucy Keegan
- Children: 5, including Lily
- Relatives: John Keegan (father-in-law)
- Education: Harvard University (BA, MBA); Worcester College, Oxford (MSc)

Brooks Phillip Victor Newmark (born 8 May 1958) is a former British Conservative politician, who served as a Member of Parliament and minister. He was elected as the Member of Parliament for Braintree in the 2005 general election and stood down at the 2015 general election.

Prior to entering politics, he was involved in various businesses and was a senior partner at a private equity firm. Newmark is a visiting academic at the University of Oxford and became a guest lecturer in politics after his parliamentary career ended. He is a founder of the charity 'A Partner in Education', a campaigner on homelessness and a member of the Rough Sleeping Advisory Panel that advises the Home Office.

== Early life ==
Newmark was born in Westport, Connecticut, in the United States, on 8 May 1958 to Howard Newmark and Gilda Gourlay (née Rames). He is of Jewish heritage. He moved to the UK aged nine and attended Caldicott Preparatory School and Bedford School. He graduated from Harvard College, receiving a BA in History in 1980. While at Harvard, he was a member of Eliot House, Lightweight Varsity Crew, Rugby Football Club, and UAC Foreign Admissions Chairman.

He was a Research Graduate in Politics at Worcester College, Oxford, from 1980 to 1982, and has an MBA in Finance from Harvard Business School and an MSc in Education from Oxford University.

== Business interests ==
Newmark was Vice President in the International Division of Shearson Lehman Brothers from 1984 to 1987, a Managing Director of Newmark Brothers Ltd, a corporate finance advisory company, from 1988 to 1993, and then a Director of Stellican Ltd from 1993 to 1998. From 1998 to 2005, Newmark was a Senior Partner at Apollo Management (UK) LP, an international private equity firm.

He was a director of Telesis Management Ltd and AAA MIP Limited. He has been a director of Connaught Brown since 2015 and a director of the Catholic Herald since 2016 among other appointments.

== Parliamentary career ==
Newmark contested Newcastle Central in 1997, and Braintree in 2001. He was elected as the Member of Parliament for Braintree (in mid Essex) in the 2005 general election over the Labour incumbent, Alan Hurst, and was re-elected in 2010 with a greater majority.

He served as a Government Whip for Office of the Deputy Prime Minister, Department for International Development, Department for Business, and Innovation & Skills. In opposition, Newmark served as the Foreign Affairs Whip (2009–10) and Treasury Whip (2007—08). Newmark had previously served as a Member of the Treasury Select Committee (2006—07) and the Science & Technology Select Committee (2005—07). Newmark was re-elected onto the Treasury Select Committee in 2012 after 5 years in the Whips' Office. In mid July 2014, Newmark was appointed as the Minister for Civil Society, in the Cabinet Office. In response to a question, following his first public speech in that role, he said that charities should "stick to their knitting" and "keep out of the realm of politics". It was later argued that these quotations were taken out of context, and in fact suggested that politicians should support charities, but not interfere.

During his time as an MP, Newmark co-founded and co-chaired Women2Win, an organisation established to encourage women into politics and public service. He also co-founded the Million Jobs Campaign to address the need for more to be done regarding youth unemployment.

Newmark resigned as Minister for Civil Society on 27 September 2014, a day before the Conservative Party Conference in Birmingham. David Cameron accepted Newmark's resignation following a sting operation by the Sunday Mirror, which resulted in Newmark texting with a 'female party activist' who was, in fact, a male undercover reporter, posing as a female to deliberately target Newmark, having failed with various other male MPs, over social media.

Fellow Conservative MP Mark Pritchard announced that he would make a formal complaint against the newspaper saying that "questionable techniques" had been involved in the paper's report. An IPSO investigation later cleared the Sunday Mirror of any wrongdoing in an announcement that came three weeks after the regulator was formed. Following a new "text-and-tell story" in October 2014 involving a young mother, Newmark announced he would not seek re-election to Parliament in the forthcoming general election.

== Life after Parliament ==
Newmark was a research associate at the University of Oxford in the Department of Politics and International Relations. He is also guest lecturing at the Said Business School on private equity, and travels to universities outside the UK to lecture in either politics or finance. He is the author of various articles on the Syrian Civil War, Brexit, US politics and homelessness.

He has authored a report on homelessness at the Centre for Social Justice think tank. The report highlighted the long-term nature of homelessness, the growth of 'tent cities' and the normalisation of rough sleeping.

== Political views ==
Newmark's interests include: Economic Policy, Foreign Affairs (Middle East, India, China and USA); Poverty Reduction & International Development (Micro Finance), Special Needs Education and Women & Equality (Founder and Co-Chairman of Women2Win).

Publications include: Direct Democracy: An Agenda for a New Model Party (2005); Simply Red; The True State of the Public Finances (CPS, 2006); The Price of Irresponsibility (CPS, 2008) and the Hidden Debt Bombshell (CPS, 2009).

== Charity work ==
Newmark is involved with charity work in Rwanda and also helps homeless charities. In 2009 Newmark co-founded the charity A Partner in Education, which helps Rwandan teachers to give the nation's children an improved education. It supports training for teachers and provides an inclusive environment for children. The charity has built a school in Rwanda that caters for over 300 children.

Newmark is involved in various charities including PARC, a respite centre based in Braintree for children with severe disabilities, and Farleigh Hospice and has volunteered for the Braintree Salvation Army and the homeless charity Crisis in London.

== Ukraine ==
Just days after the beginning of the Russian invasion of Ukraine, he participated in evacuations of Ukrainians civilians from the Polish border to a number of European countries. As the war progressed, Newmark founded a charity Angels for Ukraine to evacuate civilians and injured soldiers, as well as deliver essential humanitarian aid along the war frontline and de-occupied areas and organise rehabilitation. Newmark scaled up his work moving closer to the war frontline to evacuate women and children, as well as the elderly. As of January 2024, Newmark evacuated over 35 000 civilians to safety, and injured soldiers.

In a move to further expand his work in Ukraine, in 2024 Brooks co-founded Trypillian, a defence start-up to develop combat-proven technologies. That includes deep-strike systems, battlefield communication tools, and autonomous solutions aimed at reducing soldier risk and increasing front-line effectiveness.

== Personal life ==
He is married to Lucy Keegan, daughter of the military historian Sir John Keegan, and has four sons and one daughter, actress Lily Newmark.

He is Jewish. Along with Rocco Forte and William Cash, Newmark owns the Catholic Herald.

Parliament of the United Kingdom
Preceded by Alan Hurst	Member of Parliament for Braintree; 2005–2015	Succeeded by James Cleverly
