= Izza =

Izza may refer to:

- Izza (singer), American pop singer and rapper
- Darat Izza, a town in northern Syria
- Michael Izza, chief executive officer of the Institute of Chartered Accountants in England and Wales
- Jaysh al-Izza, Syrian rebel group
- Izza Génini (b. 1942), Moroccan film producer and director
- Izza Kizza, American hip-hop musician
- Izza Ignacio, actress in the Philippines

== See also ==
- Itza (disambiguation)
