= Alan Hurst (politician) =

British politician (1945–2023)

- Hurst as an MP

Member of Parliament for Braintree
- In office 1 May 1997 – 11 April 2005
- Preceded by: Tony Newton
- Succeeded by: Brooks Newmark

Essex County Councillor for Orsett and Stifford
- In office 6 May 1993 – 1 April 1998
- Preceded by: Peter Revell
- Succeeded by: Seat abolished

Personal details
- Born: Alan Arthur Hurst; 2 September 1945 Southend-on-Sea, England
- Died: 31 January 2023 (aged 77) Southend-on-Sea, England
- Party: Labour
- Spouse: Hilary Burch (m. 1976)
- Children: 3
- Education: University of Liverpool

Alan Arthur Hurst (2 September 1945 – 31 January 2023) was a British solicitor and Labour politician who served as Member of Parliament (MP) for Braintree in Essex from 1997 to 2005.

== Early life ==
Hurst was born in Southend, the son of George Hurst. He attended Westcliff High School for Boys in Westcliff-on-Sea. From the University of Liverpool, he gained a BA in History.

Before being elected an MP, he had been deputy leader of Southend-on-Sea Council, joining the council in 1968. He continued to practise part-time as a solicitor while an MP. In 1993, he was elected to Essex County Council for the Orsett & Stifford division.

== Parliamentary career ==
At the 1997 general election, he caused a stir by overturning Tony Newton's majority of 17,494, with a majority of 1,494; Braintree had been Conservative since the 1955 election. Almost as surprising (though not with hindsight, since the Tories made next to no progress nationally in 2001) was his holding the seat at the 2001 general election, though this time with a majority of 358, making it Labour's second-most marginal victory at that election and the sixth-most overall. He lost the seat in the 2005 general election to Brooks Newmark of the Conservative Party.

Hurst never held government office, remaining a backbencher. He served on the Agriculture Select Committee for a time (including during the 2001 foot and mouth crisis) and then on the Speaker's Panel. He occasionally rebelled against the government, often on judicial issues, though not on any high-profile issues or as part of any major rebellions, with the exception of supporting an amendment to the top-up fees bill (Higher Education Act 2004) which would have removed such fees from the bill whilst maintaining other aspects of it, an attempt to have the bill's increased funding for universities without higher fees (presumably by putting up the basic or higher rate of income tax or introducing a graduate tax); the government claimed that the greater funding (almost, though not quite, universally accepted to be necessary) could only be achieved with top-up fees, so the choice was fees or continuing underfunding, but many saw this as a false dichotomy imposed by the government (which had pledged not to raise income tax – indeed, had cut it in its first term – and had already raised National Insurance contributions once, though this move was very popular) to hold funding hostage, as it were, and ensure the bill's passing. This rebellion was not overly important, as the much larger rebellion on the bill's second reading had already failed (by a mere five votes). He did vote for a total ban on hunting with dogs when the government was proposing mere restriction, but this was not, strictly speaking, a rebellion as it was a free vote.

== Personal life ==
Hurst married in July 1969 and had one son in 1974. Hurst married Hilary Burch in 1976; they had a son and a daughter.

Hurst died in Southend on 31 January 2023 at the age of 77.

Parliament of the United Kingdom
Preceded by Tony Newton	Member of Parliament for Braintree; 1997–2005	Succeeded by Brooks Newmark
