= Instituto Tecnológico Superior Aeronáutico =

- Region served: Ecuador
- Parent organization: Ecuadorian Air Force

The Instituto Tecnológico Superior Aeronáutico (English: Aeronautics Superior Technical Institute) of the Ecuadorian Air Force is an educational institution with a mission to train civilian and military personnel through a comprehensive education in technical areas, scientific and humanistic.

Since 1954 the Ecuadorian Air Force through the school specialty first, then ITSA, has been training the air technologists (aerotécnicos) staff of different specialties in aviation.

The ITSA graduated its first class in Avionics, Logistics, Aviation Mechanics, and Telematics, with proficiency in English language, for employment inf civil and military aviation.

Because of it being put into competition with other schools, especially with ESPOL, ITSA lost in the exclusive Advanced suborbital ASTRONAUT - ASA/T program for the training of a corps of Ecuadorean astronauts, getting only 2 out of 10 seats available.
