= Washington Iza =

Ecuadorian artist

Washington Iza (born 1947) is an Ecuadorian artist known chiefly for his radical surrealistic style of painting that contrasted sharply with more traditional styles used by fellow Ecuadorian painters such as Oswaldo Guayasamín, Eduardo Kingman and Bolivar Mena Franco.

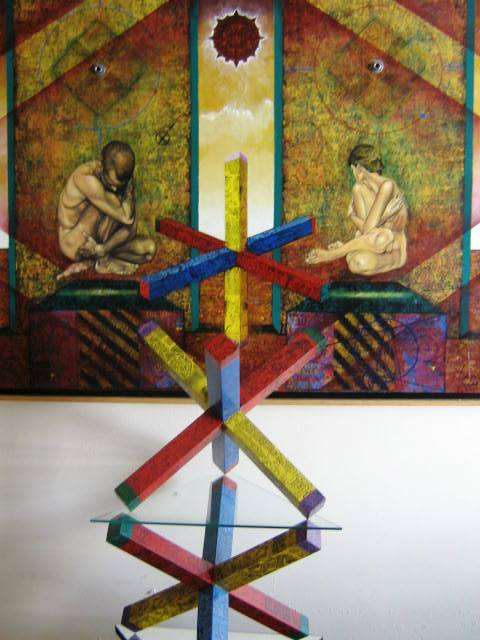

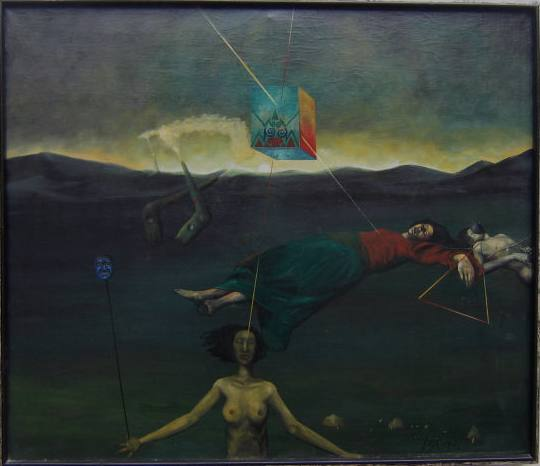

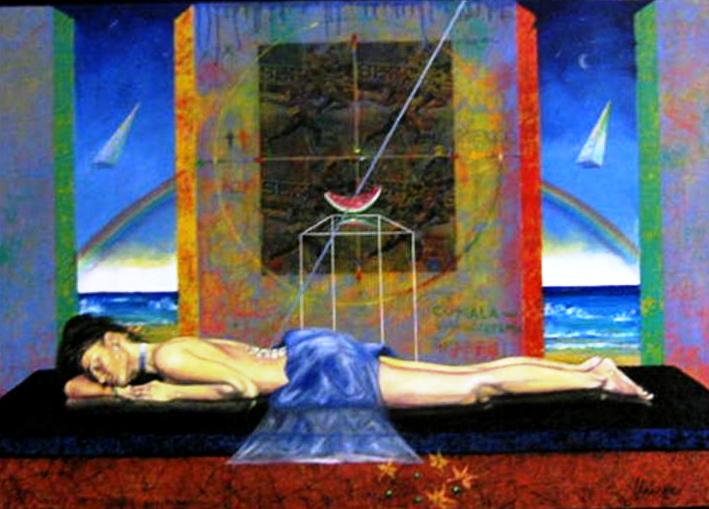

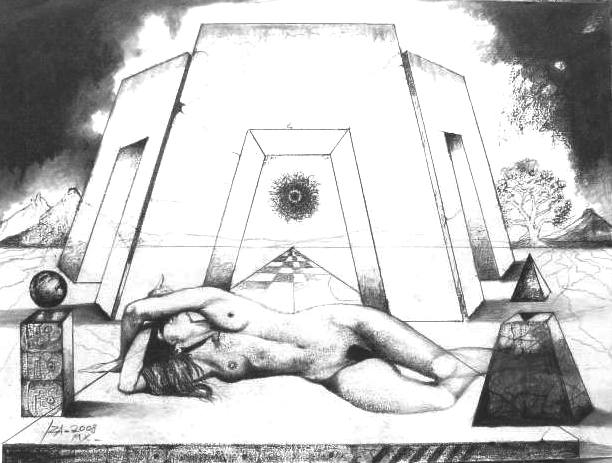
