= Iza – Itza =

Iza Itza
- Municipality
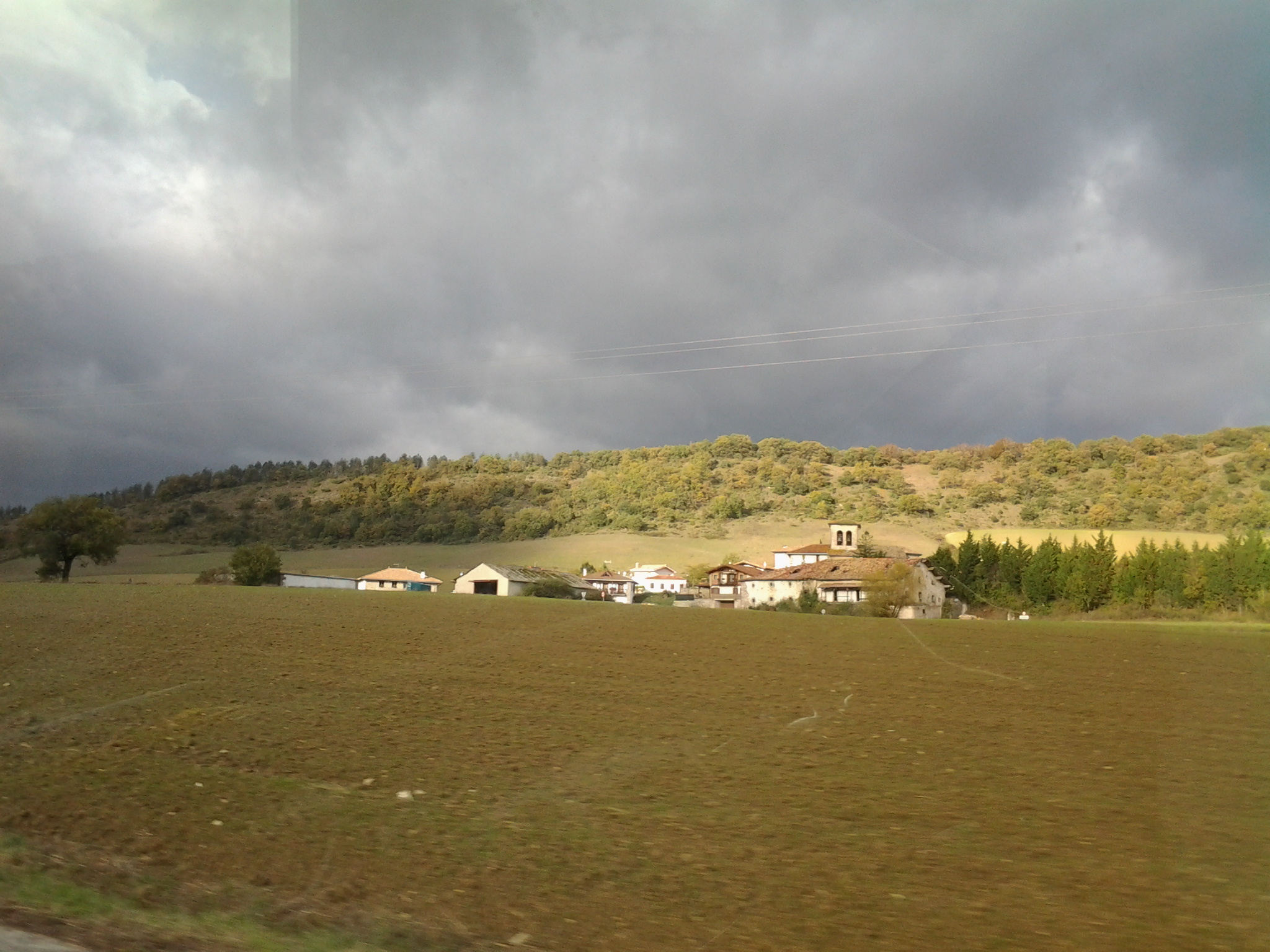

- Coat of arms

- Location of Iza – Itza within Navarre Location of Iza – Itza within Spain
- Coordinates: 42°52′57″N 1°46′03″W
- Country: Spain
- Autonomous community: Navarre
- Comarca: Cuenca de Pamplona

Government
  - Mayor: José Antonio Vázquez Rodríguez

Area
  - Total: 52.03 km^{2} (20.09 sq mi)
- Elevation: 490 m (1,610 ft)

Population (2025-01-01)
  - Total: 1,459
  - Density: 28.04/km^{2} (72.63/sq mi)
- Time zone: UTC+1 (CET)
  - Summer (DST): UTC+2 (CEST)
- Postal code: 31892

Iza is a town located in the province and autonomous community of Navarre, northern Spain. Sixteen villages belong to this municipality: Aguinaga, Aldaba, Aldaz, Áriz, Atondo, Cía, Erice, Gulina, Iza, Larumbe, Lete, Ochovi, Ordériz, Sarasa, Sarasate and Zuasti.

In 2017 it had 1192 inhabitants (INE).
