= Information Technology Services Agency =

Executive Agency overview
- Formed: 1991
- Preceding Executive Agency: Department of Social Security
- Dissolved: 2000
- Superseding Executive Agency: Electronic Data Systems
- Jurisdiction: United Kingdom
- Parent department: Department of Social Security

Information Technology Services Agency (ITSA) was an executive agency of the United Kingdom Department of Social Security (subsequently the Department for Work and Pensions), which was set up in 1991.

== Intention and Goal ==
ITSA was established to "help create and deliver an active modern social security service, which encourages and enables independence and aims to pay the right money at the right time".

== Dissolution ==
ITSA ceased to exist in 2000, following the outsourcing of the majority of its functions and staff to Electronic Data Systems (EDS). EDS was later purchased by HP in a $13.9 billion deal.
