= John Wakeham =

British businessman and Conservative Party politician (born 1932)

The Right Honourable The Lord Wakeham PC DL
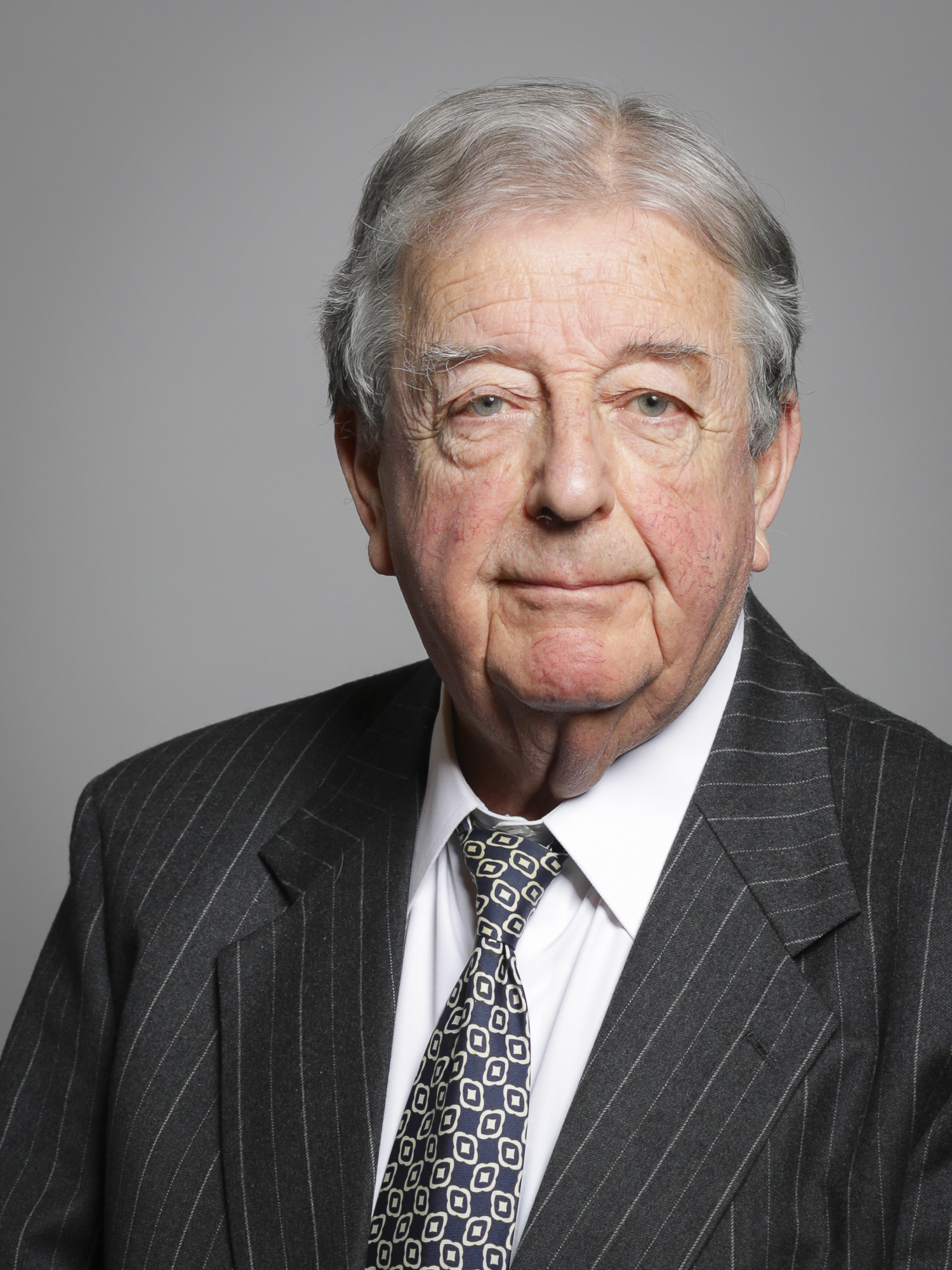
- Official portrait, 2019

Leader of the House of Lords
- In office 11 April 1992 – 20 July 1994
- Prime Minister: John Major
- Preceded by: The Lord Waddington
- Succeeded by: Viscount Cranborne

Lord Keeper of the Privy Seal
- In office 11 April 1992 – 20 July 1994
- Prime Minister: John Major
- Preceded by: The Lord Waddington
- Succeeded by: Viscount Cranborne
- In office 13 June 1987 – 10 January 1988
- Prime Minister: Margaret Thatcher
- Preceded by: John Biffen
- Succeeded by: The Lord Belstead

Secretary of State for Energy
- In office 24 July 1989 – 11 April 1992
- Prime Minister: Margaret Thatcher; John Major
- Preceded by: Cecil Parkinson
- Succeeded by: Office abolished

Lord President of the Council
- In office 10 January 1988 – 24 July 1989
- Prime Minister: Margaret Thatcher
- Preceded by: The Viscount Whitelaw
- Succeeded by: Geoffrey Howe

Leader of the House of Commons
- In office 13 June 1987 – 24 July 1989
- Prime Minister: Margaret Thatcher
- Preceded by: John Biffen
- Succeeded by: Geoffrey Howe

Government Chief Whip in the House of Commons Parliamentary Secretary to the Treasury
- In office 9 June 1983 – 13 June 1987
- Prime Minister: Margaret Thatcher
- Preceded by: Michael Jopling
- Succeeded by: David Waddington

Minister of State for the Treasury
- In office 6 April 1982 – 9 June 1983
- Prime Minister: Margaret Thatcher
- Preceded by: The Lord Cockfield
- Succeeded by: Barney Hayhoe

Parliamentary Under-Secretary of State for Trade and Industry
- In office 15 September 1981 – 6 April 1982
- Prime Minister: Margaret Thatcher
- Preceded by: Michael Marshall
- Succeeded by: John Butcher

Lord Commissioner of the Treasury
- In office 9 January 1981 – 15 September 1981
- Prime Minister: Margaret Thatcher
- Preceded by: David Waddington
- Succeeded by: Tony Newton

Member of the House of Lords
- Lord Temporal
- Life peerage 24 April 1992

Member of Parliament for South Colchester and Maldon (Maldon 1974–1983)
- In office 28 February 1974 – 16 March 1992
- Preceded by: Brian Harrison
- Succeeded by: John Whittingdale

Personal details
- Born: 22 June 1932 (age 94)
- Party: Conservative
- Spouses: Roberta Wakeham (m. 1965; her death 1984); Alison Ward (m. 1985)
- Children: 3

John Wakeham, Baron Wakeham, PC DL (born 22 June 1932) is a British businessman and Conservative Party politician. He was chancellor of Brunel University between 1998 and 2012, and since then has been its chancellor emeritus.

Wakeham was a director of Enron from 1994 until its bankruptcy in 2001.

== Early life and education ==
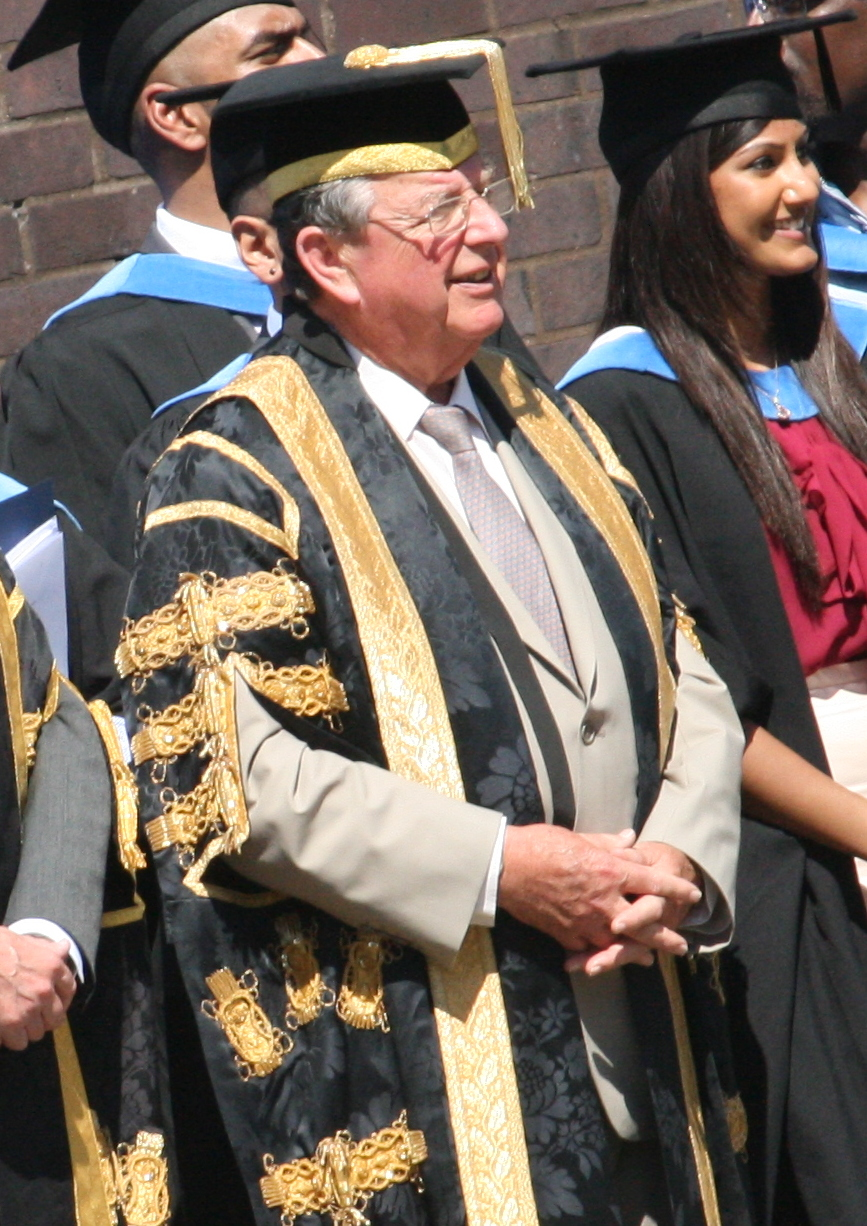
Wakeham as Chancellor of Brunel University

Wakeham was educated at two independent schools in Surrey: Aldro School in Shackleford, and Charterhouse near Godalming. He became a successful accountant and later a businessman.

== Political career ==
Wakeham stood unsuccessfully in Coventry East in 1966 and in Putney in 1970 before his election to the House of Commons at the February 1974 general election as the Member of Parliament (MP) for Maldon in Essex. He became a minister following Margaret Thatcher's victory in 1979.

During the late 1980s he served as Leader of the House of Commons, in which capacity he was responsible for the televising of Parliament, and as Energy Secretary (1989–92), where he drew up plans for the privatisation of electricity supply. Following a recommendation by John Major, he was created a life peer on 29 April 1992 taking the title Baron Wakeham, of Maldon in the County of Essex, serving as the Leader of the House of Lords until 1994.

Wakeham became chairman of the Press Complaints Commission in 1995, retiring in 2001. In 1997 he was appointed a Deputy lieutenant of Hampshire. Tony Blair appointed him in 1999 to head a Royal commission on reform of the House of Lords – the resulting Wakeham Report suggested a mainly-appointed Lords be maintained, with a small elected component.

== Personal life ==
His first wife, Roberta, was killed in the Brighton hotel bombing in October 1984 and he was trapped in rubble for seven hours, suffering serious crush injuries to his legs. The couple had two children. Wakeham married his secretary, Alison Ward MBE, in 1985 and they have a son of their own. Before being Wakeham's secretary, Ward had been Margaret Thatcher's secretary.

== Arms ==
Coat of arms of John Wakeham
Coronet A Coronet of a Baron. Crest A Greyhound statant Or, crowned with a Mural Crown chequy Azure and Argent, and supporting by the dexter foreleg a Cross Raguly Argent, nailed of three Or. Escutcheon Per fess embattled Azure and Argent, a Pale counterchanged, in the azure a Lion's Head guardant Or, langued Gules, and in the argent, a Bugle Horn Azure, garnished and stringed Or. Supporters Dexter: a Sea-Lion Azure, Mane and Head in trian aspect Argent, langued Gules, crowned with a Crown Tridenty Gold; Sinister: a Sea-Horse Azure, Head and Neck Argent, and crowned also with a Crown Tridenty Gold, the whole upon a Compartment consisting of three Bars wavy Azure, Argent and Azure, in front thereof a Grassy Mount growing therefrom three Double Roses Argent, upon Gules, barbed and seeded stalked and leaved proper. Motto Vigilo (I watch)

Parliament of the United Kingdom
Preceded by Brian Harrison	Member of Parliament for Maldon; 1974–1983	Constituency abolished
New constituency	Member of Parliament for South Colchester and Maldon; 1983–1992	Succeeded by John Whittingdale
Political offices
Preceded by Michael Jopling	Chief Whip of the Conservative Party; 1983–1987	Succeeded by David Waddington
Preceded by Michael Jopling	Parliamentary Secretary to the Treasury; 1983–1987	Succeeded by David Waddington
Preceded by John Biffen	Lord Privy Seal; 1987–1988	Succeeded by The Lord Belstead
Preceded by John Biffen	Leader of the House of Commons; 1987–1989	Succeeded by Geoffrey Howe
Preceded by The Viscount Whitelaw	Lord President of the Council; 1988–1989	Succeeded by Geoffrey Howe
Preceded by Cecil Parkinson	Secretary of State for Energy; 1989–1992	Energy merged into Department of Trade and Industry
Preceded by The Lord Waddington	Leader of the House of Lords; 1992–1994	Succeeded by Viscount Cranborne
Preceded by The Lord Waddington	Lord Privy Seal; 1992–1994	Succeeded by Viscount Cranborne
Party political offices
Preceded by The Lord Waddington	Leader of the Conservative Party in the House of Lords; 1992–1994	Succeeded by Viscount Cranborne
Media offices
Preceded by Oliver McGregor	Chairman of the Press Complaints Commission; 1995–2002	Succeeded by Robert Pinker
Orders of precedence in the United Kingdom
Preceded by The Lord Wilson of Tillyorn	Gentlemen; Baron Wakeham	Followed by The Lord Owen
