= Department of Social Security (United Kingdom) =

Welfare and pensions agency in Britain

Department overview
- Formed: 1988
- Preceding Department: Department of Health and Social Security
- Dissolved: 2001
- Superseding Department: Department for Work and Pensions
- Jurisdiction: United Kingdom
- Headquarters: Leeds, United Kingdom
- Minister responsible: Various incumbents, Secretary of State for Social Security
- Child agencies: Employment Service; Benefits Agency; Contributions Agency; Child Support Agency; Information Technology Services Agency

The Department of Social Security (DSS) was a governmental agency in the United Kingdom from 1988 to 2001.

== History ==
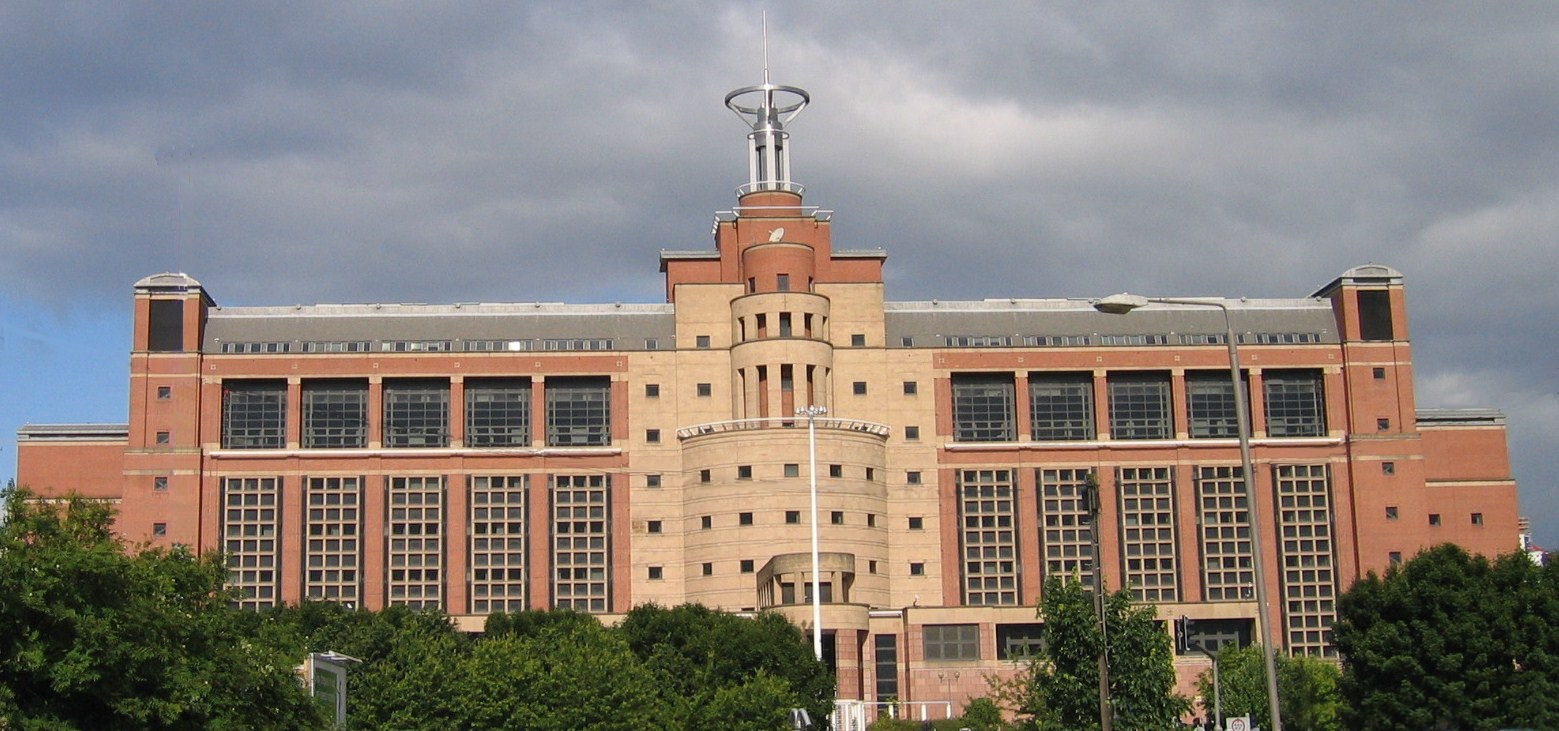
The DSS headquarters in Quarry Hill, Leeds.

After the Fowler report, the Department of Health and Social Security separated during 1988 to form two departments, one of which was the DSS. During 2001, the department was largely replaced by the Department for Work and Pensions, with the other responsibilities of the department assumed by the Treasury and the Ministry for Defence.

Beginning in 1989, the Department of Social Security was subdivided into six executive agencies - firstly into the Resettlement agency, in 1990 ITSA (Information Technology Services Agency), the Benefits Agency and Contributions Agency in 1991, the Child Support Agency in 1993 and the War Pensions Agency in 1994.

As part of the UK government's spending review (March 1998), a paper New Ambitions for our Country: A New Contract for Welfare (1998) announced plans to increase efficiency ("streamline") in the administration of benefits from policy of social welfare, plans subsequently adopted as the "single gateway to benefits". The Welfare Reform and Pensions Act 1999 brought reforms to the DSS guided by the principle of "work for those that can and security for those that cannot".

== Secretaries of state ==
Secretaries of State for Social Security (1988–2001)
Secretary of State	Term of office		Political party	Cabinet
John Moore	25 July 1988	22 July 1989	Conservative	Thatcher III
Tony Newton	23 July 1989	9 April 1992	Conservative	Thatcher III
Tony Newton	23 July 1989	9 April 1992	Conservative	Major I
Peter Lilley	10 April 1992	1 May 1997	Conservative	Major II
Harriet Harman	1 May 1997	27 July 1998	Labour	Blair I
Alistair Darling	27 July 1998	8 June 2001	Labour	Blair I
