= Peter Lilley =

British politician (born 1943)

The Right Honourable The Lord Lilley PC
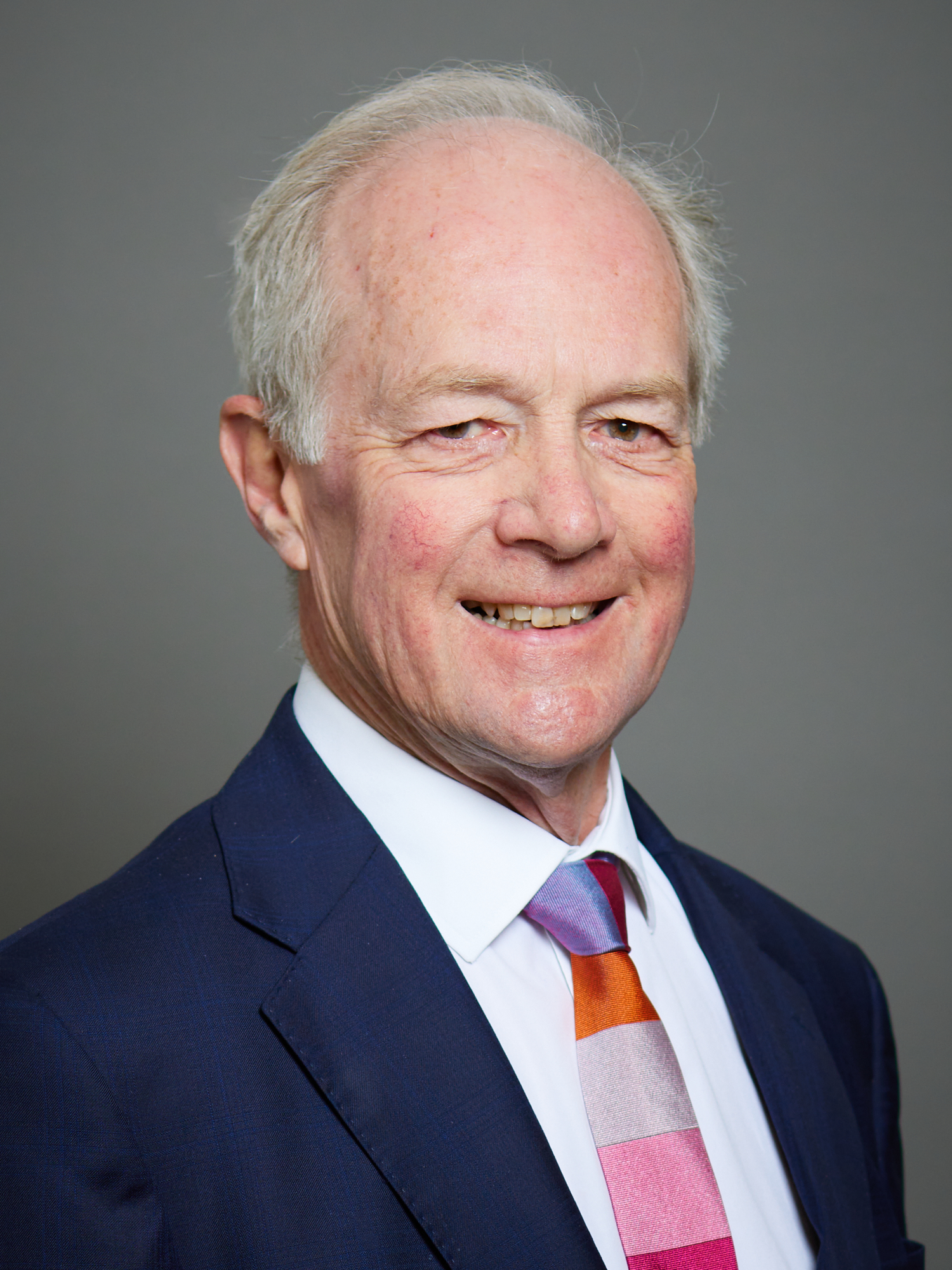
- Official portrait, 2022

Deputy Leader of the Conservative Party
- In office 2 June 1998 – 15 June 1999
- Leader: William Hague
- Preceded by: Michael Heseltine (Note: As Deputy Leader of the Opposition. Office vacant between 19 June 1997 and 2 June 1998.)
- Succeeded by: Michael Ancram (Note: Office vacant between 15 June 1999 and 18 September 2001.)

Secretary of State for Social Security
- In office 11 April 1992 – 2 May 1997
- Prime Minister: John Major
- Preceded by: Tony Newton
- Succeeded by: Harriet Harman

Secretary of State for Trade and Industry President of the Board of Trade
- In office 14 July 1990 – 11 April 1992
- Prime Minister: Margaret Thatcher; John Major
- Preceded by: Nicholas Ridley
- Succeeded by: Michael Heseltine
Shadow cabinet posts
Shadow Chancellor of the Exchequer
In office 19 June 1997 – 2 June 1998
| Leader | William Hague |
| Preceded by | Kenneth Clarke |
| Succeeded by | Francis Maude |
Shadow Secretary of State for Social Security
In office 2 May 1997 – 19 June 1997
| Leader | John Major |
| Preceded by | Harriet Harman |
| Succeeded by | Iain Duncan Smith |
Junior ministerial offices
Financial Secretary to the Treasury
In office 24 July 1989 – 14 July 1990
| Prime Minister | Margaret Thatcher |
| Preceded by | Norman Lamont |
| Succeeded by | Francis Maude |
Economic Secretary to the Treasury
In office 11 June 1987 – 24 July 1989
| Prime Minister | Margaret Thatcher |
| Preceded by | Ian Stewart |
| Succeeded by | Richard Ryder |
Parliamentary offices
Member of the House of Lords
Lord Temporal
Life peerage 18 June 2018
Member of Parliament for Hitchin and Harpenden
In office 1 May 1997 – 3 May 2017
| Preceded by | Constituency established |
| Succeeded by | Bim Afolami |
Member of Parliament for St Albans
In office 9 June 1983 – 1 May 1997
| Preceded by | Victor Goodhew |
| Succeeded by | Kerry Pollard |

Personal details
- Born: 23 August 1943 (age 83) Hayes, Kent, England
- Party: Conservative
- Spouse: Gail Ansell
- Education: Clare College, Cambridge (BA)

Peter Bruce Lilley, Baron Lilley, PC (born 23 August 1943) is a British politician and life peer who served as a cabinet minister in the governments of Margaret Thatcher and John Major. A member of the Conservative Party, he was Member of Parliament (MP) for Hitchin and Harpenden from 1997 to 2017 and, prior to boundary changes, St Albans from 1983.

Born in Kent, Lilley studied economics at Clare College, Cambridge. He served as Trade and Industry Secretary from July 1990 to April 1992. As Social Security Secretary from April 1992 to May 1997, he introduced Incapacity Benefit.

On 26 April 2017, he announced his retirement as an MP. He has been a long-term critic of the European Union and backed Brexit in the 2016 United Kingdom European Union membership referendum. He was supportive of the Eurosceptic pressure group Leave Means Leave. In May 2018, he was nominated for a peerage in the House of Lords.

== Early life ==
Lilley, whose father was a personnel officer for the BBC, was born at Hayes in Kent. He was educated at Dulwich College and Clare College, Cambridge, where he studied natural sciences before switching to economics. His Cambridge contemporaries included Kenneth Clarke, Michael Howard and Norman Lamont, a group later known as the Cambridge Mafia.

Before he entered Parliament he was an energy analyst at the City of London stockbroker W. Greenwell & Co. He was the chairman of the Conservative think tank the Bow Group from 1973 to 1975.

In October 1974 he stood as a candidate in the safe Labour seat of Tottenham and was defeated by the defending MP Norman Atkinson. He later said "I fought Tottenham, and Tottenham fought back."

== Parliamentary career ==
Following his election in 1983 as MP for St Albans, a generally safe Conservative seat, he served as Parliamentary Private Secretary to Nigel Lawson, then as Economic Secretary to the Treasury and Financial Secretary to the Treasury before joining the Cabinet as Secretary of State for Trade and Industry to replace Nicholas Ridley in mid-1990 after the latter was forced to resign over an anti-German remark.

Initially regarded as a right wing Thatcher loyalist, he privately told her her career was finished after she failed to win outright in the first round ballot of a leadership challenge, and subsequently urged her ultimate successor John Major to stand for election to succeed her. Following the 1992 general election he became Secretary of State for Social Security.

=== Social Security Secretary ===
In 1992, John Major made Lilley the secretary of state at the Department of Social Security at a time when the number of claimants of sickness benefits was growing rapidly. Shortly after his appointment, Lilley entertained the Conservative Party's annual conference by outlining his plan to "close down the something for nothing society", delivered in the form of a pastiche of the Lord High Executioner's "little list" song from The Mikado by Gilbert and Sullivan:

I've got a little list / Of benefit offenders who I'll soon be rooting out / And who never would be missed / They never would be missed. /
There's those who make up bogus claims / In half a dozen names / And councillors who draw the dole / To run left-wing campaigns / They never would be missed / They never would be missed. /
There's young ladies who get pregnant just to jump the housing queue / And dads who won't support the kids / of ladies they have ... kissed / And I haven't even mentioned all those sponging socialists / I've got them on my list / And they'll none of them be missed / They'll none of them be missed.

The speech was well received by party members and tabloid newspapers but some commentators "saw his performance as symbolic of a party out of touch with some of society's most vulnerable people". Spitting Image depicted him as a commandant at a Nazi concentration camp and commentator Mark Lawson of The Independent said that if Lilley stayed as Secretary of State for Social Security, it would be "equivalent to Mary Whitehouse becoming madam of a brothel".

In 1995, Lilley introduced Incapacity Benefit in the hope of checking the rise in sickness benefit claims. Unlike its predecessor, Invalidity Benefit, this new welfare payment came with a medical test that gauged claimants' ability to work. Nevertheless, the number of claimants and the cost to the taxpayer continued to rise.

Lilley was among the front bench Conservative ministers who threatened to join the Maastricht Rebels in voting against his government over the signing of the Maastricht Treaty. When asked why Lilley and two of his colleagues had not been sacked from their front bench positions, Major replied "We don't want another three more of the bastards out there"

=== Conference song ===
Lilley reprised his lampooning of some people drawing benefits from the National Insurance scheme – the overall number of which had grown rapidly on his watch – by singing to the Conservative Party's annual conference after it had lost the general election in 1997. He changed the words of "Land of Hope and Glory" to create a song "Land of Chattering Classes", in condemnation of the purported abandonment of British values and history by Tony Blair's New Labour. Lilley joked that a Labour version of Land and Hope and Glory had been "leaked" to him. He said, "They call it 'Land of Pseudo Tories' and it goes like this:

"Land of chattering classes, no more pageantry / Darlings, raise your glasses, to brave modernity / Who needs Nelson or Churchill? The past is so passé / Britain's now about Britpop and the River Café / God, this place is so frumpy, let's be more like LA!"

After cheers from the conference, he continued: "Not to be outdone, [Chancellor] Gordon Brown has tried to trump his neighbour [Mr Blair] with a new version of Rule Britannia":"

"Cool Britannia, where saving costs you more / Unless, like Geoffrey Robinson, your Trust's offshore!"

=== In opposition ===
He contested the 1997 Conservative Party leadership election, placing fourth in a field of five, ahead of Michael Howard. In opposition, he held the post of Shadow Chancellor of the Exchequer from 1997 to 1998 and was Deputy Leader of the Conservative Party from 1998 to 1999. In June 1999, Conservative Party leader William Hague sacked Lilley as part of a Shadow Cabinet reshuffle. The cause was Lilley's Rab Butler Memorial Lecture, in which he suggested the party distance itself from Thatcher's free market ideology.

Lilley is known for being an advocate of marijuana legalisation. In 2001, Lilley provoked some controversy in his party and Britain more widely by calling for cannabis to be legalised in a Social Market Foundation pamphlet.

Lilley produced a report for the Bow Group in 2005 that was highly critical of Government plans to introduce national identity cards.

When David Cameron was elected leader of the Conservatives in December 2005, Lilley was appointed Chairman of the Globalisation and Global Poverty policy group as part of Cameron's extensive 18-month policy review.

=== Climate change ===
In November 2012, it was reported that Lilley had been selected by the Conservative Party to join the House of Commons Select Committee on Climate Change. Lilley was at that time vice chairman and senior independent non-executive director of Tethys Petroleum and had received options to buy over $400,000 of shares at a price above their then market value. He resigned from the board in 2014 without exercising those options. He was seen by some as being unsuitable for the position because of this role and a perceived conflict of interest. He was one of only five MPs to oppose the Climate Change Act 2008. Further scrutiny came from the highlighting by Private Eye that Lilley had previously lobbied then climate change minister Ed Miliband with letters requesting the 'cost of global warming'.

=== Queen's Speech amendment ===
On 19 May 2016, Lilley, backed by other Eurosceptic Tory MPs as well as the other parties proposed a rebel amendment to the Queen's Speech, over fears that the US-EU pact would lead to the privatisation of the NHS by paving the way for American health providers in the UK. Lilley said that the Investor state dispute settlement provision in TTIP would grant American multinationals the right to sue the British government over any regulations which affected their profits, and questioned why the British government had not tried to exclude the NHS from TTIP.

The UK government ultimately agreed to amend the Queen's Speech to commit to explicitly protecting the NHS from the terms of the future trade deal.

Lilley had earlier committed to supporting withdrawal from the EU during the referendum campaign.

=== Common Sense Group ===
Following an interim report on the connections between colonialism and properties now in the care of the National Trust, including links with historic slavery, Lilley was among the signatories of a letter to The Telegraph in November 2020 from the "Common Sense Group" of Conservative Parliamentarians. The letter accused the National Trust of being "coloured by cultural Marxist dogma, colloquially known as the 'woke agenda'".

== Personal life ==
He married Gail Ansell, a dress designer turned artist, on 24 May 1979. The couple have no children. Lilley has a holiday home in France.

Lilley was created a life peer on 18 June 2018 taking the title of Baron Lilley, of Offa in the County of Hertfordshire.

== Notes ==
Parliament of the United Kingdom
| Preceded by Victor Goodhew | Member of Parliament for St Albans; 1983–1997 | Succeeded by Kerry Pollard |
| New constituency | Member of Parliament for Hitchin and Harpenden; 1997–2017 | Succeeded by Bim Afolami |
Political offices
| Preceded by Ian Stewart | Economic Secretary to the Treasury; 1987–1989 | Succeeded by Richard Ryder |
| Preceded by Norman Lamont | Financial Secretary to the Treasury; 1989–1990 | Succeeded by Francis Maude |
| Preceded by Nicholas Ridley | Secretary of State for Trade and Industry; 1990–1992 | Succeeded by Michael Heseltine |
| Preceded by Nicholas Ridley | President of the Board of Trade; 1990–1992 | Succeeded by Michael Heseltine |
| Preceded by Tony Newton | Secretary of State for Social Security; 1992–1997 | Succeeded by Harriet Harman |
| Preceded by Harriet Harman | Shadow Secretary of State for Social Security; 1997 | Succeeded by Iain Duncan Smith |
| Preceded by Kenneth Clarke | Shadow Chancellor of the Exchequer; 1997–1998 | Succeeded by Francis Maude |
Party political offices
| Vacant Title last held by The Viscount Whitelaw | Deputy Leader of the Conservative Party; 1998–1999 | Vacant Title next held by Michael Ancram |
Orders of precedence in the United Kingdom
| Preceded by The Lord Pickles | Gentlemen; Baron Lilley | Followed by The Lord McCrea of Magherafelt and Cookstown |
