= Tony Newton, Baron Newton of Braintree =

British politician (1937–2012)

The Right Honourable The Lord Newton of Braintree OBE PC DL
- Newton in 2012

Leader of the House of Commons Lord President of the Council
- In office 11 April 1992 – 2 May 1997
- Prime Minister: John Major
- Preceded by: John MacGregor
- Succeeded by: Ann Taylor

Secretary of State for Social Security
- In office 23 July 1989 – 11 April 1992
- Prime Minister: Margaret Thatcher; John Major
- Preceded by: John Moore
- Succeeded by: Peter Lilley
Junior ministerial offices
Chancellor of the Duchy of Lancaster
In office 25 July 1988 – 24 July 1989
Prime Minister	Margaret Thatcher
Preceded by	Kenneth Clarke
Succeeded by	Kenneth Baker
Minister of State for Health
In office 10 September 1986 – 25 July 1988
Prime Minister	Margaret Thatcher
Preceded by	Kenneth Clarke
Succeeded by	David Mellor
Minister of State for Social Security and the Disabled
In office 11 September 1984 – 10 September 1986
Prime Minister	Margaret Thatcher
Preceded by	Rhodes Boyson
Succeeded by	John Major
Parliamentary Under-Secretary of State for Health and Social Security
In office 5 March 1982 – 11 September 1984
Prime Minister	Margaret Thatcher
Preceded by	Lynda Chalker
Succeeded by	Ray Whitney
Lord Commissioner of the Treasury
In office 1 October 1981 – 5 March 1982
Prime Minister	Margaret Thatcher
Preceded by	John Wakeham
Succeeded by	Alastair Goodlad
Assistant Government Whip
In office 7 May 1979 – 1 October 1981
Prime Minister	Margaret Thatcher

Member of the House of Lords
- Lord Temporal
- Life peerage 31 October 1997 – 25 March 2012

Member of Parliament for Braintree
- In office 28 February 1974 – 8 April 1997
- Preceded by: Constituency established
- Succeeded by: Alan Hurst

Personal details
- Born: Antony Harold Newton; 29 August 1937 Harwich, Essex, England
- Died: 25 March 2012 (aged 74) Colchester, Essex, England
- Party: Conservative
- Spouse(s): Janet Huxley (m. 1962; div. 1986) Patricia Gilthorpe (m. 1986)
- Children: 2
- Relatives: Emma Gilthorpe (stepdaughter)
- Education: Trinity College, Oxford

Antony Harold Newton, Baron Newton of Braintree (29 August 1937 – 25 March 2012) was a British Conservative politician and former Cabinet member. He was the member of Parliament for Braintree from 1974 to 1997, and was later a member of the House of Lords.

== Early life ==
Newton was born in Harwich, Essex. He was educated at Friends School Saffron Walden and Trinity College, Oxford, where he was President of Oxford University Conservative Association and the Union. He unsuccessfully fought Sheffield Brightside in the 1970 General Election. In the 1972 Birthday Honours, Newton was appointed to the Order of the British Empire as an Officer (OBE).

== Member of Parliament ==
Newton was first elected for the new constituency of Braintree in February 1974 with a majority of 2,001, and successfully retained the seat in the October 1974 general election with a reduced majority of 1,090. The Conservative victory at the 1979 general election boosted his majority dramatically to 12,518, and it increased at every subsequent election to a high of 17,494 at the 1992 general election before his defeat in the Labour landslide at the 1997 general election by 1,451 votes.

=== In government ===
Newton was appointed a government whip when the Conservatives came to power in 1979. In 1982 he moved to a junior ministerial position at the Department of Health and Social Security, where he remained until 1988, becoming Minister for Social Security and Disabled People in 1984, and Minister for Health in 1986.

In the 1988 New Year Honours, Newton was sworn of the Privy Council. He became Chancellor of the Duchy of Lancaster and a minister at the DTI for a year, before being promoted to Secretary of State for Social Security from 1989 to 1992, and then taking up the positions of Lord President of the Council and Leader of the House of Commons until 1997. From 1992 to 1995, he answered to Prime Minister's Questions when John Major was not present. His discretion about Major's four-year affair with Edwina Currie is credited with enabling Major to become prime minister.

=== Peerage ===
In the 1997 Prime Minister's Resignation Honours, after Newton lost his seat, he was raised to the peerage as Baron Newton of Braintree, of Coggeshall in the County of Essex on 31 October 1997.

He attempted to be selected for the 1999 European Parliament Election, but was unsuccessful.

In 1998 he was appointed a professional standards director of the Institute of Directors, a position he held until 2004.

Newton chaired the Hansard Society Commission on Parliamentary Scrutiny which ran from 1999 to 2001. The Commission concluded that Parliament was being left behind by changes in the constitution, government and society and set out reforms for improving its function.

He became a chairman of the Further Education Funding Council for East Region, serving between 1998 and 2001, the privy councillors' committee on the Anti-Terrorism, Crime and Security Act 2001 between 2002 and 2004, the Tax Law Rewrite Steering Committee between 2007 and 2010), the North East Essex Mental Health NHS Trust between 1997 and 2001, the Royal Brompton and Harefield NHS Trust between 2001 and 2009, East Anglia's Children's Hospices between 1998 and 2002 and Help the Hospices between 2002 and 2010, the Council on Tribunals (1998–2007), and its successor the Administrative Justice and Tribunals Council (2007–2009); the Standing Conference on Drug Abuse (1997–2001). He became a deputy lieutenant of Essex in 2002

== Personal life ==
Newton was married to Janet Huxley from 25 August 1962 until they divorced in 1986. Their younger daughter, Jessica de Mounteney (née Newton) is the current First Parliamentary Counsel.

He married Patricia Gilthorpe (née Thomson) on 26 September 1986 after the death of her first husband. Through this marriage, he was the stepfather of British businesswoman Emma Gilthorpe.

Newton was a heavy smoker from an early age. He died at Colchester Hospital of chronic obstructive pulmonary disease on 25 March 2012. He was survived by his two daughters from his first marriage.

Parliament of the United Kingdom
New constituency	Member of Parliament for Braintree; 1974–1997	Succeeded by Alan Hurst
Political offices
Preceded by Rhodes Boyson	Minister of State for Social Security (Minister for the Disabled); 1984–1986	Succeeded by John Major
Preceded by Kenneth Clarke	Chancellor of the Duchy of Lancaster; 1988–1989	Succeeded by Kenneth Baker
Preceded by John Moore	Secretary of State for Social Security; 1989–1992	Succeeded by Peter Lilley
Preceded by John MacGregor	Lord President of the Council; 1992–1997	Succeeded by Ann Taylor
Preceded by John MacGregor	Leader of the House of Commons; 1992–1997	Succeeded by Ann Taylor
