= Leventhorpe =

Leventhorpe may refer to:

- Collett Leventhorpe (1815–1889), US brigadier-general
- John Leventhorpe (c.1370–1435), royal attorney
- Leventhorpe baronets
- The Leventhorpe School
