= John Barley =

John Barley may refer to:

- John E. Barley (born 1945), American politician
- John Barley (MP) for Hertfordshire
