= William Greville =

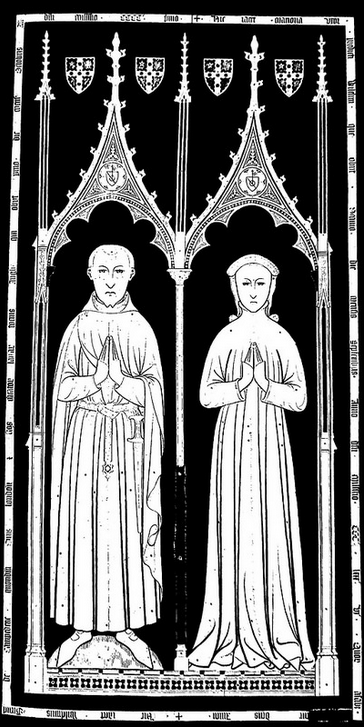
ledger stone of William Greville (d.1401), Chipping Campden Church, Gloucestershire

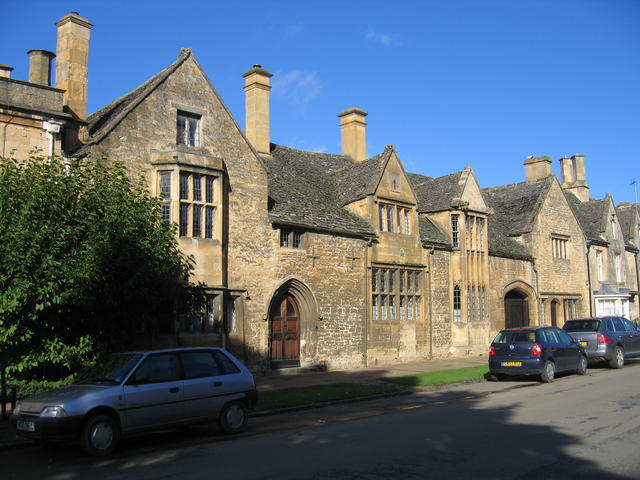
Greville House, in the town of Chipping Campden, residence of William Greville and one of the oldest surviving buildings in that town. Situated nearly opposite the Woolstaplers' Hall

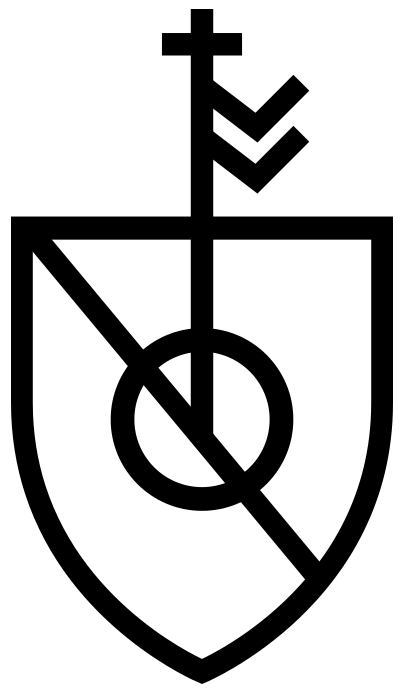
Merchant's mark of William Greville, as displayed on his ledger stone in Chipping Campden Church

Arms of Greville: Sable, on a cross engrailed or five pellets a bordure engrailed of the second. They are reminiscent of four bales of wool

William Greville (died 1 October 1401) (alias Grevel, Graville, Grevill, etc.), of Chipping Campden in Gloucestershire and a Citizen of the City of London, was a prominent wool-merchant and is the ancestor of the present Greville Earls of Warwick. The Latin inscription on his ledger stone in Chipping Campden Church, which he rebuilt at his own expense, describes him as flos mercatorum lanar(iorum) tocius (totius) Angli(a)e, "the flower of the wool-merchants of all England". This language is reminiscent of that used to describe certain prominent knights such as Edward, the Black Prince (d.1376) who was described by Froissart (d. circa 1405) as la fleur de toutte chevalerie dou monde ("the flower of all chivalry of the world") and was likely intended to suggest a degree of equivalence between mercantile and martial activities". He was amongst the richest and most influential wool merchants of his era and was the leading purchaser of wool from the Cotswold Hills.

== Origins ==
He was the son of William I Grevel (d.post 1397) of Chipping Campden, the son and heir of John Grevel (d.pre-1359) by his wife a certain Margaret. The Greville family is believed to be of Norman or Flemish origin and had settled in Chipping Campden by 1276. Leland (d.1552) stated: "Sum hold opinion that the Grevilles cam originally in at the Conquest", but although the name appears Norman in style, surviving records do not mention the family before the 13th century. The name is similar to that of Grenville of Bideford in Devon and of Stowe, Kilkhampton in Cornwall, later Earls of Bath, which is known to have had common ancestry with the Norman nobleman Richard de Grenville (died after 1142), one of the Twelve Knights of Glamorgan.

== Career ==
He was a Citizen of the City of London, as is stated on his ledger stone. He was a member of the Holy Trinity Guild in Coventry, whose other members included several members of Parliament for Bristol and the prominent merchant and royal financier Richard Whittington.

== Marriage and progeny ==
He married twice:

- Firstly to a certain Marion, possibly a daughter of Sir John Thornborough, by whom he had progeny six sons and two daughters, including:
  - Ludovic Greville, eldest son, of Drayton in Oxfordshire.
  - John Greville (died 1444), of Sezincote, Gloucestershire, seven times a member of parliament for Gloucestershire.
  - Alice Greville, wife of Edmund Ludlow (d.1409) of Ludlowes manor in Campden.
  - Mary Greville, wife of John Gifford of Harpre.
- Secondly to Joan Thornbury (d.1449), sister and heiress of Sir Philip Thornbury (d.1457), of Little Munden and Bygrave, Hertfordshire, thrice MP for Hertfordshire. Without surviving progeny. She survived him and re-married to Sir Edward Benstede (1353/5-1432), of Bennington, Hertfordshire, 5 times MP for Hertfordshire.

== Landholdings ==
Greville invested much of his trading profits into land and buildings. His fine town house in Chipping Campden, situated nearly opposite the Woolstaplers' Hall, survives as one of the oldest buildings in that town. He purchased more than 14 houses in the town, as well as several nearby manors including:

- Lasborough;
- Meon;
- Milcote, Warwickshire. In 1398 he purchased from Sir Walter Beauchamp the manor of Milcote in Warwickshire and settled it on himself and his second wife Joan Thornbury (d.1449) in tail-male with successive remainders to his sons by his first wife, John, Lewis and William. Here his descendant Ludovic Greville (d.1589) in 1567 obtained royal licence to crenellate his grand new mansion house called "Mount Greville".
- Charlton Kings, Gloucestershire, which he purchased in 1386/7 from Sir John de Ros, son of James de Ros of Gednay, Lincolnshire.

== Death and burial ==
He signed his will on 2 April 1401 and desired to be buried in the "Church of the Blessed Mary of Campden" and bequeathed 100 marks to "the new work to be carried on there". He founded a chantry there and ordered that four chaplains should sing mass daily for ten years for his soul and for those of his ancestors.

=== Monumental brass ===
His very large ledger stone (8 ft 9" * 4 ft 4") with monumental brasses survives in Campden Church, in a position of great prominence, on the floor of the chancel in front of the communion rails. The brasses represent Greville and his wife, under a double canopy crocketed and cusped, both with hands folded in prayer, the wife being on her husband's left hand. His own figure measures 5 ft 4" * 1 ft 4".

==== Description of male effigy ====
(Per Davis, 1899): The hair of William Grevel is short and removed from the temples like that of the reeve described by Chaucer in his Canterbury Tales. At this period the young men were clean shaven, their elders wore a moustache and beard. Chaucer describes "A marchant was there with a forked beard", and this fashion was duly followed by William Grevel. He wears a tight-fitting tunic reaching to the ankles; from the waist it is fastened by buttons, of which three are visible above the girdle and eleven beneath it. The sleeves of this tunic are close-fitting, and from beneath them emerge the tighter sleeves of an under-dress with seven buttons showing on each wrist. The tunic is confined at the waist by a girdle made of leather profusely adorned, and passing through an oval buckle, the end is passed under the girdle hanging down in front, and terminated by a metal pendant, on which is engraved a rosette. On his left side is the anelace, or basilard, which is suspended from the girdle by a thong. The anelace is broad in the blade, sharpened on both sides and tapered from hilt to point. The scabbard is ornamented with little pateras at the top and middle. Over all is a mantle, fastened by three large buttons on the right shoulder, and, gathered over the left arm, hangs gracefully. Round his neck he wears a hood of which the buttons are not shown. The shoes are pointed and fastened across the instep by a plain buckle. The background of the feet is plain.

==== Description of female effigy ====
(Per Davis, 1899): Marion Grevel wears the nebulée head dress, which consists of three rolls of frills worn only on the top of the head and shoulders. Round her neck is a frill. The kirtle and cote-hardie are buttoned from the neck to the feet, and more than four score buttons are shown. The author of the Romance of Sir Degrevant, in describing the dress of an earl's daughter, says: "to tell her botennes was toore" (i.e., dure, hard, to count her buttons would give much trouble). She wears neither mantle nor girdle, and closely buttoned mittens are seen on her wrists. The ends of the shoes are visible.

==== Heraldry ====
In each pediment is Greville's merchant's mark, being a cross standing on a globe, and two streamers attached to the shaft. On either side of the ledger stone and from the middle rise pinnacles. Between the finials and pinnacles are four heraldic shields, all displaying the arms of Greville: Sable, on a cross engrailed or five pellets a bordure engrailed of the second a mullet of the second in the dexter quarter for difference. These arms are today borne by the Greville Earls of Warwick, but undifferenced by a mullet. It is very unusual to find both a merchant's mark and a coat of arms on the same monument, as the social classes of merchant and gentry were distinct. The two outer pinnacles are continued down till their bases from the extremity of the diapered band at the bottom upon which the figures stand. The centre pinnacle has a foliated capital and is continued till its base rests on the diapered band.

==== Inscription ====
The edge of the ledger stone is inscribed in Latin as follows:

Hic jacet Wilelmus Grevel de Campdene quond(a)m civis Londinii & flos m(er)cator(um) lanar(iorum) tocius Angli(a)e qui obiit p(ri)mo die mense Octobris an(n)o Domi(ni) mill(ensi)mo CCC p(ri)mo. Hic jacet Mariona uxor predicti Wilelmi qu(a)e obiit decimo die mensis Septembris anno D(omi)ni mill(ensi)mo CCC^{o} LXXX^{o} VI^{o} Quor(um) a(n)i(m)ab(us) (propicie)tur Deus amen (which may be translated as: "Here lies William Grevel of Campden, at some time a citizen of London and the flower of the wool-merchants of all England, who died on the first day in the month of October in the year of our Lord the thousandth four hundredth and first. Here lies Marion, wife of the aforesaid William, who died on the tenth day of the month of September in the year of our Lord the thousandth three hundredth eightieth and sixth. On the souls of whom may God look with favour, amen".

== Descendants ==
His descendant was Fulke Greville, 1st Baron Brooke (1554–1628) of Beauchamp's Court, Warwickshire, 5th Baron Willoughby de Broke and de jure 13th Baron Latimer, the famous Elizabethan poet and dramatist, who obtained a grant of Warwick Castle and its dependencies and was the ancestor of the Greville Earls of Warwick, which title is extant today.

== Sources ==
- Davis, Cecil T., Monumental Brasses of Gloucestershire, Gloucestershire Notes & Queries, London, 1899, pp. 22–5
- Edmondson, Joseph, An Historical and Genealogical Account of the Noble Family of Greville, London, 1766
- Gough, Vol.II, Plate IV, p. 10, engraving of brass.
- Bigland, Ralph, Collections for Gloucesshire, Vol.I, p. 283, engraving of brass.
- Boutells Series, Weekly Register, No.7, p. 105, engraving of brass.
- Boutells Heraldry, Plate XXXVII, illustration of coat of arms.
- Debretts. Peerage & Baronetage 2003, Greville family past and present.
