= List of shipwrecks in April 1854 =

The list of shipwrecks in April 1854 includes ships sunk, foundered, wrecked, grounded, or otherwise lost during April 1854.

== 1 April ==
List of shipwrecks: 1 April 1854
| Ship | State | Description |
|---|---|---|
| Abundance | United Kingdom | The ship was driven ashore at Ness Point, Suffolk. She was refloated. |
| Clyde, and Gothenburg | United Kingdom | The steamship Clyde was run into and sunk in the River Thames by Gothenburg (United Kingdom) on the occasion of the latter vessel's launching. Gothenburg was severely damaged at the stern. |
| Courier | United States | The ship was wrecked in the Falkland Islands. Her crew survived. She was on a voyage from San Francisco, California to Rio de Janeiro, Brazil. |
| Duke of Sussex | United Kingdom | The ship ran aground on the Whitby Rock. She floated off and sank off Whitby, Yorkshire. Her crew survived. |
| Fuchsia | United Kingdom | The ship was wrecked off Shapinsay, Orkney Islands. Her crew were rescued. She was on a voyage from Newcastle upon Tyne, Northumberland to Kirkwall, Orkney Islands. |
| Industry | United Kingdom | The sloop sprang a leak and sank in the North Sea 12 nautical miles (22 km) off st. Abbs Head, Berwickshire. Her crew were rescued. She was on a voyage from Sunderland, County Durham to South Alloa, Clackmannanshire. |
| Quiberonnais | France | The ship was in collision with Jeune Amand (France) and sank in the Bay of Biscay off the mouth of the Gironde. Her crew were rescued by Jeune Amand. |
| Visitor | United Kingdom | The brigantine was driven ashore 4 nautical miles (7.4 km) west of the Dungeness Lighthouse, Kent. She was on a voyage from Sunderland, County Durham to Plymouth, Devon. She was refloated and resumed her voyage. |

== 2 April ==
List of shipwrecks: 2 April 1854
| Ship | State | Description |
|---|---|---|
| Caiman | French Navy | The Elan-class corvette ran aground and was wrecked off Zeyla, Egypt. Her crew were rescued by HMS Bellerophon and HMS Elphinstone (both Royal Navy). |
| Columbien | United Kingdom | The ship was wrecked between Point Lonsdale and Barwon Heads, Victoria with the loss of four of her crew. |
| Eagle | (United Kingdom of Great Britain and Ireland) British North America | The ship was abandoned in the Atlantic Ocean. She was on a voyage from Halifax, Nova Scotia to Liverpool, Lancashire. |
| Eliza | Belgium | The ship was wrecked at St. Jean d'Acre, Ottoman Syria. |

== 3 April ==
List of shipwrecks: 3 April 1854
| Ship | State | Description |
|---|---|---|
| Charles Watson | United Kingdom | The ship was lost in the Caratasca Lagoon, British Honduras. |

== 4 April ==
List of shipwrecks: 4 April 1854
| Ship | State | Description |
|---|---|---|
| Ivanhoe | United Kingdom | The steamship was driven ashore on Goeree, Zeeland, Netherlands. She was on a voyage from Leith, Lothian to Rotterdam, South Holland, Netherlands. She was refloated and taken in to Rotterdam. |
| Spirit of the Times | United Kingdom | The ship ran aground off Pernambuco, Brazil. She was on a voyage from Pernambuco to Paraíba, Brazil. She was refloated and put back to Pernambuco in a leaky condition. |

== 5 April ==
List of shipwrecks: 5 April 1854
| Ship | State | Description |
|---|---|---|
| Phoenix | United States | The schooner sank in Mobile Bay. |
| Raisbeck | United Kingdom | The ship ran aground and was damaged at Memel, Prussia. She was on a voyage from Sunderland, County Durham to Memel. |

== 6 April ==
List of shipwrecks: 6 April 1854
| Ship | State | Description |
|---|---|---|
| Anne Logan | United Kingdom | The ship caught fire in the English Channel and put in to Shoreham-by-Sea, Sussex. She was on a voyage from London to Saint Vincent, Virgin Islands. |
| Felix | United Kingdom | The whaler was wrecked on the coast of Greenland with the loss of two of her crew. Survivors were rescued on 12 April by the whaler Dolphin (Bremen). |

== 7 April ==
List of shipwrecks: 7 April 1854
| Ship | State | Description |
|---|---|---|
| Alliance | United Kingdom | The ship was damaged by fire at Charleston, South Carolina, United States. |
| Cowslip | United Kingdom | The ship was driven ashore and wrecked at Memel, Prussia. She was on a voyage from Swinemünde to Memel. |
| Exchange | United Kingdom | The schooner was run down and sunk in the Patapsco River by the steamship Hugh Jenkins (United States). Exchange was on a voyage from Nassau, Bahamas to Baltimore, Maryland, United States. |
| Friendship | United Kingdom | The ship was driven ashore on Scharhörn. She was on a voyage from an English port to Hamburg. She was refloated and taken in to Cuxhaven. |
| Mary Ann Cook | United Kingdom | The ship was driven ashore 4 nautical miles (7.4 km) from Memel. She was on a voyage from Swinemünde to Memel. |

== 8 April ==
List of shipwrecks: 8 April 1854
| Ship | State | Description |
|---|---|---|
| Calcutta | United Kingdom | The ship was driven ashore near Barrington, New Jersey, United States. She was on a voyage from Boston, Massachusetts to Liverpool, Lancashire. She was later refloated and taken in to Saint John, New Brunswick, British North America, where she arrived on 15 April. |
| City of Manchester | United Kingdom | The steamship ran aground off Reedy Island, Delaware, United States. She was on a voyage from Liverpool to Philadelphia, Pennsylvania. She was refloated and completed her voyage. |
| Gazelle | United States | The steamboat suffered a boiler explosion and sank in the Willamette River at Canemah, Oregon Territory. At least 24 people were killed. She was subsequently salvaged, rebuilt, and re-entered service as Sarah Hoyt. |
| Saxony | United States | The ship was driven ashore in the Jupiter Inlet. She was on a voyage from Boston, Massachusetts to Matanzas, Cuba and Liverpool. |
| William Connal | United Kingdom | The ship was driven ashore near "Hurushpoor" with the loss of four of her crew. She was on a voyage from London to Calcutta, India. |

== 9 April ==
List of shipwrecks: 9 April 1854
| Ship | State | Description |
|---|---|---|
| Catharina Henrietta | Prussia | The ship ran aground at Memel and was damaged. She was on a voyage from St. Ubes, Portugal to Memel. |

== 10 April ==
List of shipwrecks: 10 April 1854
| Ship | State | Description |
|---|---|---|
| Arabia | United Kingdom | The barque was driven ashore and wrecked at the mouth of the São Francisco River. She was on a voyage from Bahia, Brazil to Liverpool, Lancashire. |
| Celebrity | United Kingdom | The ship ran aground and was damaged at Exmouth, Devon. She was on a voyage from Newport, Monmouthshire to Aberdeen. |
| Exchange | United Kingdom | The schooner was run into and sunk at Baltimore, Maryland, United States by the steamship Hugh Jenkins (United States). Her crew were rescued. She was on a voyage from Nassau, Bahamas to Baltimore. |
| Harmina | Netherlands | The ship ran aground on the Nehrung, in the Baltic Sea off Pillau, Prussia. Her crew were rescued. She was on a voyage from London, United Kingdom to Königsberg, Prussia. |

== 11 April ==
List of shipwrecks: 11 April 1854
| Ship | State | Description |
|---|---|---|
| Dumfries | United Kingdom | The ship was wrecked in the Pescadores. Her crew were rescued. She was on a voyage from Shanghai, China to London. |

== 12 April ==
List of shipwrecks: 12 April 1854
| Ship | State | Description |
|---|---|---|
| Ace of Trumps | United Kingdom | The ship was driven ashore and capsized at Nillage Point, Devon. She was on a voyage from Guernsey, Channel Islands to Cardiff, Glamorgan. She was refloated on 20 May with assistance from the schooner Susan (United Kingdom) and taken in to Watermouth, Devon. |
| Calcutta | United Kingdom | The ship was driven ashore on Cape Sable Island, Nova Scotia, British North America. She was on a voyage from Boston, Massachusetts, United States to London. |
| Defender | United Kingdom | The barque ran aground at South Shields, County Durham. She was on a voyage from South Shields to Portsmouth, New Hampshire, United States. She was refloated and put back to South Shields. |
| Dreadnought | United Kingdom | The tug ran aground at Liverpool, Lancashire. |

== 13 April ==
List of shipwrecks: 13 April 1854
| Ship | State | Description |
|---|---|---|
| HMS Alban | Royal Navy | The ship ran aground of Dragør, Denmark. She was refloated the next day. |
| Governor Briggs | United Kingdom | The ship was sighted in the Atlantic Ocean whilst on a voyage from the Clyde to Baltimore, Maryland, United States. No further trace, presumed foundered with the loss of all hands. |
| SMS Radetzky | Austrian Navy | The frigate ran aground on being launched at Northam, Hampshire, United Kingdom. |
| Richard Alsop | United Kingdom | The ship was driven ashore in Chesapeake Bay. She was on a voyage from Liverpool, Lancashire to Alexandria, Virginia, United States. |

== 15 April ==
List of shipwrecks: 15 April 1854
| Ship | State | Description |
|---|---|---|
| Alert | United Kingdom | The ship ran aground whilst on a voyage from Smyrna, Ottoman Empire to Falmouth, Cornwall. She was refloated and resumed her voyage. |
| Arion | (United Kingdom of Great Britain and Ireland) Cape Colony | The ship was wrecked at Port Beaufort. Her crew were rescued. She was on a voyage from Cape Town to Port Beaufort. |
| Andromache | Imperial Russian Navy | Crimean War: The corvette was sunk at Odesa by HMS Furious (Royal Navy). |
| Harriet | United Kingdom | The ship ran aground off Andros, Greece and was abandoned. She was on a voyage from Newcastle upon Tyne, Northumberland to Valencia, Spain and Constantinople, Ottoman Empire. She was later refloated and taken in to Piraeus, Greece. |
| Manhattan | United States | The schooner was driven ashore and wrecked at Beach Haven, New Jersey with the loss of eight of her nine crew. |
| Powhattan | United States | The passenger ship ran aground off Beach Haven. She broke up the next day with the loss of all on board, estimated as between 200 and 365 people. |

== 16 April ==
List of shipwrecks: 16 April 1854
| Ship | State | Description |
|---|---|---|
| Innellan | United Kingdom | The barque was driven ashore and wrecked at Port Fairy, Victoria. |
| Shackamaxon | United States | The ship was driven ashore 10 nautical miles (19 km) south of Barnegat, New Jersey. |

== 17 April ==
List of shipwrecks: 17 April 1854
| Ship | State | Description |
|---|---|---|
| Alida | Kingdom of Hanover | The ship ran aground off Spiekeroog and was wrecked. Her crew were rescued. She was on a voyage from Bremerhaven to Leer. |
| Argo | United Kingdom | The ship capsized in the Atlantic Ocean. Her crew were rescued on 19 April by Mohongo (United Kingdom). Argo was on a voyage from Baltimore, Maryland to Liverpool, Lancashire. |
| Brenda | United Kingdom | The smack struck a sunken rock in Rathlin Sound and was consequently abandoned. She was on a voyage from Londonderry to Donegal. |

== 18 April ==
List of shipwrecks: 18 April 1854
| Ship | State | Description |
|---|---|---|
| Bellona | United Kingdom | The barque was abandoned in the Atlantic Ocean. Her crew were rescued by Cleopatra (United Kingdom). Bellona was on a voyage from Cardiff, Glamorgan to Quebec City, Province of Canada, British North America. |
| Hopewell | United Kingdom | The collier, a barque, ran aground on the Haisborough Sands, in the North Sea off the coast of Norfolk with the loss of all hands. She was refloated with the assistance of the steamship Beacon, the lifeboat Prince Albert and the yawl Musquito (all United Kingdom and taken in to Lowestoft, Suffolk. |
| Lucy | United Kingdom | The ship which had run aground at Jurby, Isle of Man on in March, was towed from Ramsey to Peel, Isle of Man by Ben-my-Chree ( (United Kingdom of Great Britain and Ireland) Isle of Man) and beached there. |

== 19 April ==
List of shipwrecks: 19 April 1854
| Ship | State | Description |
|---|---|---|
| Amelia | Portugal | The schooner was wrecked on the Devil's Tongue, off Gibraltar. |
| Hannah | United Kingdom | The ship was abandoned in the Atlantic Ocean. All on board were rescued by SS Arabia (United Kingdom). |
| James Moran | United Kingdom | The barque was abandoned in the Atlantic Ocean. Her crew were rescued by Davenport and/or Delia (United Kingdom). James Moran was on a voyage from London to Quebec City, Province of Canada, British North America. |
| London | United Kingdom | The ship foundered in the Atlantic Ocean. Her crew were rescued. She was on a voyage from Cardiff, Glamorgan to Quebec City. |
| Solide | France | The ship was discovered abandoned in the Bristol Channel, having been in collision with another vessel. She was towed in to Milford Haven, Pembrokeshire, United Kingdom by HMRC Adder ( Board of Customs). Solide was on a voyage from a French port to Swansea, Glamorgan, United Kingdom. |

== 20 April ==
List of shipwrecks: 20 April 1854
| Ship | State | Description |
|---|---|---|
| Britannia | United Kingdom | The barque was abandoned in the Atlantic Ocean. Her crew were rescued by the full-rigged ship Premier (United Kingdom). Britannia was on a voyage from Cádiz, Spain to Quebec City, Province of Canada, British North America. |
| Commerce | United Kingdom | The barque was abandoned in the Atlantic Ocean. Her crew were rescued by Wallfleet (United Kingdom). Commerce was on a voyage from Hull, Yorkshire to Quebec City. |
| Elbira | (United Kingdom of Great Britain and Ireland) Cape Colony | The ship was abandoned off the African coast. Her crew were rescued. She was on a voyage from Akyab, Burma to an English port. |
| Rambler | United Kingdom | The ship was driven ashore between Brighton and Shoreham-by-Sea, Sussex. She was on a voyage from Cork to London. |

== 21 April ==
List of shipwrecks: 21 April 1854
| Ship | State | Description |
|---|---|---|
| Boucalaise Campagne | France | The ship ran aground on the Cross Sand, in the North Sea off the coast of Norfolk, United Kingdom. She was on a voyage from Saint-Servan, Ille-et-Vilaine to Hartlepool, County Durham, United Kingdom. She was refloated and taken in to Great Yarmouth, Norfolk in a leaky condition. |
| Choice | United Kingdom | The schooner was driven ashore north of Hartlepool, County Durham. She was refloated and towed in to Hartlepool. |
| John Cooper | United Kingdom | The ship was destroyed by fire off the Cape of Good Hope, Cape Colony. Her crew were rescued by the schooner Hoppet (Sweden). John Cooper was on a voyage from Cochin, India to London. |
| Rose | United Kingdom | The ship ran aground at Neath, Glamorgan. She was on a voyage from Neath to Padstow, Cornwall. She was refloated and resumed her voyage. |
| Sir William Gomm | United Kingdom | The ship departed from Moulmein, Burma for London. No further trace, presumed foundered with the loss of all hands. |

== 22 April ==
List of shipwrecks: 22 April 1854
| Ship | State | Description |
|---|---|---|
| Audia | Russia | Crimean War, Bombardment of Odessa: The steamship was sunk at Odesa by cannon fire from French Navy and Royal Navy vessels. She was later refloated. |
| Dneipr | Russia | Crimean War, Bombardment of Odessa: The steamship was sunk at Odesa by cannon fire from French Navy and Royal Navy vessels. |
| Fanchon | Sweden | The ship was driven ashore and wrecked on Gotska Sandön. |
| Golden Fleece | United States | The medium clipper was driven ashore at Fort Point, California. She was on a voyage from San Francisco to Manila, Spanish East Indies. She broke up on 23 October. |
| Lulea | Russia | Crimean War, Bombardment of Odessa: The steamship was sunk at Odesa by cannon fire from French Navy and Royal Navy vessels. |
| Nicholas I | Russia | Crimean War, Bombardment of Odessa: The ship was sunk at Odesa by cannon fire from French Navy and Royal Navy vessels. |
| Weland | United Kingdom | The sloop was discovered derelice in the North Sea off the coast of Lincolnshire. She was towed in to Grimsby by the pilot boat No. 9 (United Kingdom). |

== 23 April ==
List of shipwrecks: 23 April 1854
| Ship | State | Description |
|---|---|---|
| Anenome | United Kingdom | The brig ran aground on the Goodwin Sands, Kent. She was on a voyage from South Shields, County Durham to Philadelphia, Pennsylvania, United States. She was refloated but drove ashore at Walmer, Kent and was wrecked. Her crew were rescued. |
| Ann and Sarah | United Kingdom | The brig was wrecked on the Whiting Sand, in the North Sea off the coast of Suffolk. Her four crew were rescued by the pilot cutter John and Mary (United Kingdom). Ann and Sarah was on a voyage from South Shields to London. |
| Bear | United Kingdom | The sloop driven ashore and wrecked at Middleton, HartlepoolMiddleton, County Durham. She was on a voyage from the River Spey to Great Yarmouth, Norfolk. |
| Emma | United Kingdom | The ship departed from South Shields for Dartmouth, Devon and Constantinople, Ottoman Empire. Presumed foundered with the loss of all hands, wreckage from the ship was sighted on 27 April 8 nautical miles (15 km) off the Knock Lightship ( Trinity House). |
| Juno | Hamburg | The ship was driven ashore in the Dardanelles. Her crew were rescued. She was on a voyage from Cartagena, Spain to Constantinople, Ottoman Empire. |
| Lucy | (United Kingdom of Great Britain and Ireland) Isle of Man | The ship sank 3 cables (560 m) off Peel. |
| Ocean | United Kingdom | The ship was beached in Studland Bay, She was on a voyage from Jersey, Channel Islands to London. |
| Robert | United Kingdom | The schooner was wrecked north of Hartlepool, County Durham. She was on a voyage from Aberdeen to Hartlepool. |

== 24 April ==
List of shipwrecks: 24 April 1854
| Ship | State | Description |
|---|---|---|
| Albertina | Sweden | The ship was wrecked on the Haisborough Sands, in the North Sea off the coast of Norfolk, United Kingdom, with the loss of six of her thirteen crew. She was on a voyage from Gothenburg, Sweden, to Bordeaux, Gironde, France. |
| Black Hawk | United Kingdom | The full-rigged ship was abandoned in the Atlantic Ocean. Of the 838 people on board, 140 had been taken off on 19 April by the barque Caroline (United Kingdom), 270 passengers had been taken off on 20 April by the barque Dirigio (United States), which also took some of her crew. The full-rigged ship Currituck (United States and an unidentified barque took more off between 21 and 23 April, with Currituck rescuing the remainder on 24 April. |
| Cheshire Lass | United Kingdom | The ship ran aground on The Platters, off the coast of Anglesey. She was on a voyage from London to Chester, Cheshire. She was refloated. |
| Ercolano | Kingdom of the Two Sicilies | The steamship sank after a collision with Sicilia ( Kingdom of the Two Sicilies) in the Gulf of Genoa. The passengers included Thomas Plumer Halsey MP, who was drowned along with his wife, youngest son, and two servants. Sir Robert Peel, MP, another passenger, survived by swimming ashore. |
| Mary Shepphard | United Kingdom | The ship was destroyed by fire 7 nautical miles (13 km) north west of "St. Bernartuno Island". All on board took to boats and survived. She was on a voyage from London to Shanghai, China. |

== 25 April ==
List of shipwrecks: 25 April 1854
| Ship | State | Description |
|---|---|---|
| Pére Grenet | France | The brig was in collision with Gazeteer (United Kingdom) in the Irish Sea with the loss of three of her crew. She was on a voyage from Santander, Spain to Liverpool, Lancashire, United Kingdom. She was towed in to Liverpool in a sinking condition. |

== 26 April ==
List of shipwrecks: 26 April 1854
| Ship | State | Description |
|---|---|---|
| Emile et Angela | France | The schooner was in collision with the schooner Bertholly (United Kingdom) and sank in the North Sea 6 nautical miles (11 km) south of Flamborough Head, Yorkshire, United Kingdom with the loss of two of her crew. She was on a voyage from Middlesbrough, Yorkshire to Brest, Finistère. |
| Riso | Sweden | The brig ran aground on the Kentish Knock. She was on a voyage from Stockholm to Lisbon, Portugal. She subsequently floated off in a waterlogged condition. |

== 27 April ==
List of shipwrecks: 27 April 1854
| Ship | State | Description |
|---|---|---|
| Aerdt van Nes | Netherlands | The full-rigged ship was wrecked on Warin's Reef, off Raine Island, New South Wales. |
| Ann and Jane | United Kingdom | The ship was lost between Loch Ryan and Ballantrae, Ayrshire. Her crew were rescued. |
| Ariadne | Norway | The schooner was driven ashore at Thurso, Caithness, United Kingdom. All eleven people on board were rescued by a fishing coble. |
| Charlotte | Netherlands | The ship was driven ashore at Maassluis, South Holland. Her crew were rescued. She was on a voyage from Liverpool, Lancashire, United Kingdom to Rotterdam, South Holland. |
| Ericsson | United States | The paddle steamer was sunk by a tornado at Jersey City, New Jersey. All on board were rescued by boats from ships in port, including some from RMS Asia (United Kingdom). Ericsson was refloated on 11 May. |
| Heart of Oak | United Kingdom | The ship was driven ashore at Southport, Lancashire. She was on a voyage from Amlwch, Anglesey to Preston, Lancashire. |
| Italia | Kingdom of Sardinia | The brig was destroyed by fire at the Ilhéu de Rosto de Cão, Azores. She was on a voyage from Rio de Janeiro, Brazil to Southampton, Hampshire, United Kingdom. |
| Mary | United Kingdom | The ship ran aground in the Zebra Channel. She was on a voyage from Ardrossan, Ayrshire to Liverpool, Lancashire. She was refloated and beached at Birkenhead, Cheshire. |
| Noord | Netherlands | The ship was wrecked on the Banjaard Sand, in the North Sea off the Dutch coast. She was on a voyage from Batavia, Netherlands East Indies to Rotterdam. |
| Orion | United Kingdom | The ship was wrecked on a reef off Barbados. She was on a voyage from Newport, Monmouthshire to Jamaica. |
| Sarah Mary | United Kingdom | The full-rigged ship was sunk by ice in the Atlantic Ocean. Her crew were rescued by Albion (United Kingdom), Ottawa (United Kingdom of Great Britain and Ireland) British North America) and other vessels. Sarah Mary was on a voyage from the Clyde to Quebec City, Province of Canada, British North America. |

== 28 April ==
List of shipwrecks: 28 April 1854
| Ship | State | Description |
|---|---|---|
| Adele | France | The ship was wrecked on the west coast of Guernsey, Channel Islands with the loss of two of her six crew. She was on a voyage from Alicante, Spain to Rouen, Seine-Inférieure. |
| Anna | Kingdom of Hanover | The ship was in collision with another vessel and sank in the English Channel off Dover, Kent. Her crew survived. She was on a voyage from Catania, Sicily to Leer. |
| Bengt | Denmark | The schooner was in collision with another vessel and was abandoned in the North Sea off Texel, North Holland, Netherlands. She was on a voyage from Gothenburg, Sweden to Honfleur, Manche, France. She was subsequently taken in to Scarborough, Yorkshire, United Kingdom in a waterlogged conditions. She arrived on 4 May. |
| Comet | United Kingdom | The sloop spang a leak and was beached near Filey, Yorkshire where she was wrecked. Her crew were rescued by the Filey Lifeboat. |
| Favourite | Bremen | The barque collided with the barque Hesper (United States) and sank in the English Channel off Start Point, Devon, United Kingdom with the loss of 201 lives. Six crew got on board Hesper. Favourite was on a voyage from Bremen to Baltimore, Maryland, United States. |
| Good Intent | United Kingdom | The sloop foundered in the North Sea off Cromer, Norfolk. Her crew were rescued by the smack Active (United Kingdom). Good Intent was on a voyage from Newcastle upon Tyne, Northumberland to London. |
| Kaffir | United Kingdom | The barque was in collision with another vessel in the English Channel 8 nautical miles (15 km) off North Foreland, Kent. The other vessel foundered with the loss of all hands. Kaffir also foundered. Her crew were rescued by Princess Royal (United Kingdom). Kaffir was on a voyage from Sunderland, County Durham to Cartagena, Spain. |
| Railway King | United Kingdom | The ship was driven ashore at "Trimum", Denmark with the loss of her four crew. |
| Sacramento | Flag unknown | The ship was wrecked at Port Phillip, Victoria. |
| Snowdrop | United Kingdom | The barque ran aground on Pickles Reef. She was on a voyage from Matanzas, Cuba to Trieste. She was refloated on 30 April and subsequently put in to Key West, Florida, United States. |

== 29 April ==
List of shipwrecks: 29 April 1854
| Ship | State | Description |
|---|---|---|
| Edward Robinson | United Kingdom | The barque was wrecked at Cape Negro, Beylik of Tunis. Her crew were rescued. She was on a voyage from Odesa to an English port. |
| James David | United Kingdom | The smack was in collision with another vessel and sank off Ailsa Craig with the loss of both crew. |
| Neptunus | (Russian Empire) Grand Duchy of Finland | The brig was holed by ice 4 nautical miles (7.4 km) off Bolderāja, Russia. Her crew were rescued. She was on a voyage from Liverpool, Lancashire, United Kingdom to Bolderāja. Neptunus was taken in to Bolderāja on 5 May in a waterlogged condition. |

== 30 April ==
List of shipwrecks: 30 April 1854
| Ship | State | Description |
|---|---|---|
| Capella | Hamburg | The ship was destroyed by fire. Her crew were rescued by Twee Anthonys (Flag unknown). She was on a voyage from Cochin, India to Hamburg. |
| G. W. Garmany | United States | The ship was driven ashore at Currituck, North Carolina. She was on a voyage from Baltimore, Maryland to Liverpool, Lancashire, United Kingdom. |
| Harkaway | United Kingdom | The troopship struck a sunken wreck off Berry Head, Devon and was damaged. She was on a voyage from Woolwich, Kent to Gallipoli, Ottoman Empire. She put in to Plymouth, Devon for repairs. |
| Lady Harvey | United Kingdom | The ship was driven ashore at Point Lonsdale, Victoria. She was on a voyage from the Clyde to Melbourne, Victoria. She was refloated but found to be severely leaky and was beached in Shortland's Bay, where she sank. |
| Mahaica | United Kingdom | The ship was wrecked on the Wreck Reefs about 200 miles off the Queensland coast. She was on a voyage from Melbourne to Calcutta, India. |

== Unknown date ==
List of shipwrecks: Unknown date in April 1854
| Ship | State | Description |
|---|---|---|
| Albertina | Sweden | The brig was wrecked on the Haisborough Sands, in the North Sea off the coast of Norfolk, United Kingdom with the loss of six of the thirteen people on board. Survivors were rescued by the sloop Liberty ( (United Kingdom of Great Britain and Ireland) Jersey). |
| Argo | United States | The ship was abandoned in the Atlantic Ocean before 25 April. She was on a voyage from Baltimore, Maryland to Liverpool, Lancashire, United Kingdom. |
| Broom | United Kingdom | The barque was abandoned in the Atlantic Ocean. Her 27 crew were rescued by Devon (United Kingdom). Broom was on a voyage from Liverpool to Halifax, Nova Scotia, British North America. |
| Colbert | France | The full-rigged ship was in collision with the full-rigged ship Scotland (United Kingdom) and sank in the Atlantic Ocean with the loss of one of her twenty crew. Survivors were rescued by Scotland. Colbert was on a voyage from Calcutta, India to Havre de Grâce, Seine-Inférieure. |
| Emma Watts | United Kingdom | The brig was abandoned in the Atlantic Ocean. Her crew were rescued by Franziska Raake (Flag unknown). |
| Glasgow | United Kingdom | The steamship ran aground near Renfrew. She was on a voyage from Glasgow, Renfrewshire to New York, United States. She was refloated the next day and taken in to Greenock, Renfrewshire in a leaky condition. |
| Irene | United Kingdom | The ship was destroyed by fire in the Atlantic Ocean. She was on a voyage from London to Melbourne, Victoria. |
| Jantina | Flag unknown | The koff was abandoned in Benskarssund before 7 April. |
| Lena | United Kingdom | The ship was abandoned in the Atlantic Ocean between 7 and 19 April. Her thirteen crew were rescued by Hannah (United Kingdom). Lena was on a voyage from Liverpool to Quebec City, Province of Canada, British North America. |
| Mary Elizabeth | United Kingdom | The ship was lost in the Veere Channel. Her crew were rescued. she was on a voyage from Liverpool to Rotterdam, South Holland, Netherlands. |
| Midas | United Kingdom | The ship was abandoned in the Atlantic Ocean. Her crew were rescued by Beatrice United Kingdom). Midas was on a voyage from Callao, Peru to Cork. |
| Pomaquod | United States | The ship was abandoned in the Atlantic Ocean before 25 April. |
| Russell Sturgess | United Kingdom | The ship was abandoned in the Atlantic Ocean. Her crew were rescued by Rainbow (United Kingdom). Russell Sturgess was on a voyage from Liverpool to Boston, Massachusetts, United States. |
| Sterling | United States | The ship foundered in the Atlantic Ocean. Her crew were rescued by Abeona (United Kingdom). Sterling was on a voyage from Newport, Monmouthshire, United Kingdom to Savannah, Georgia. |
| Underwriter | United States | The ship was driven ashore at Manasquan, New Jersey before 19 April. All on board were rescued. She was on a voyage from Liverpool to New York. Underwriter was refloated on 25 April and towed in to New York. |
| HMS Victory | Royal Navy | The tender sprang a leak and sank at Portsmouth, Hampshire. All on board were rescued. |
| Walter Claxton | United States | The barque was driven ashore and wrecked at San Francisco, California. |
| Y | France | The ship was wrecked on the Buyadere Reef, in the Bissagos Islands, Portuguese Guinea before 19 April. Her crew were rescued. She was on a voyage from Cardiff, Glamorgan, United Kingdom to Sierra Leone. |
| Yorkshire Lass | United Kingdom | The barque foundered in the Atlantic Ocean. Some of her crew were rescued by Eagle (United Kingdom). Yorkshire Lass was on a voyage from Newport, Monmouthshire to Quebec City. |
