= Thomas Trevor, 22nd Baron Dacre =

British landowner and politician

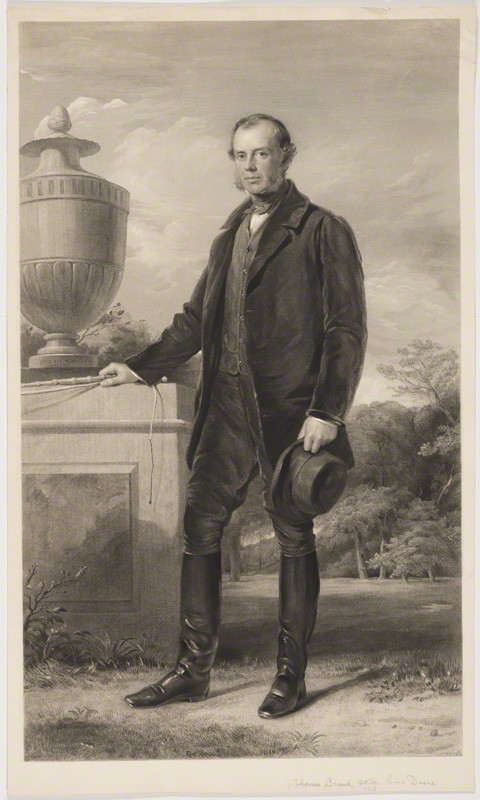
Thomas Crosbie William Trevor, 22nd Baron Dacre

Thomas Crosbie William Trevor, 22nd Baron Dacre (5 December 1808 – 26 February 1890) was a British landowner and politician.

== Background ==
Born Thomas Brand, Dacre was the eldest son of General Henry Trevor, 21st Baron Dacre, and Pyne, daughter of the Very Reverend Maurice Crosbie, Dean of Limerick. Henry Brand, 1st Viscount Hampden, Speaker of the House of Commons, was his younger brother. In 1824 he assumed by Royal licence the surname of Trevor in lieu of his patronymic. Educated at Christ Church, Oxford, he was a member of Boodle's, White's and Brooks' clubs.

== Political career ==
Dacre was returned to Parliament as one of three representatives for Hertfordshire in 1847, a seat he held until 1852. The following year he succeeded his father in the barony and entered the House of Lords. Between 1865 and 1869 he served as Lord Lieutenant of Essex.

== Estates ==
According to John Bateman, who derived his information from statistics published in 1873, Lord Dacre, of The Hoo, Kimpton, Welwyn, had around 13,000 acres comprising: 6,658 acres in Hertfordshire (worth 9,527 guineas per annum), 3,600 acres in Essex (worth 3,550 guineas per annum), 2,081 acres in Cambridge (worth 2,323 guineas per annum) and 978 acres in Suffolk (worth 1,223 guineas per annum).

== Family ==
Lord Dacre married the Hon. Susan Sophia, daughter of Charles Cavendish, 1st Baron Chesham, in 1837. They had no children. He died at The Hoo, Hertfordshire, in February 1890, aged 81, and was succeeded in the barony by his younger brother, Lord Hampden. Lady Dacre died in August 1896, aged 79.

Parliament of the United Kingdom
Preceded by Hon. Granville Ryder; Thomas Plumer Halsey; Abel Smith	Member of Parliament for Hertfordshire; 1847–1852; With: Thomas Plumer Halsey; Sir Henry Meux, Bt	Succeeded by Sir Edward Bulwer-Lytton, Bt; Thomas Plumer Halsey; Sir Henry Meux, Bt
Honorary titles
Preceded by The Viscount Maynard	Lord Lieutenant of Essex; 1865–1869	Succeeded by Sir Thomas Western, Bt
Peerage of England
Preceded by Henry Otway Trevor	Baron Dacre; 1st creation 1853–1890	Succeeded by Henry Bouverie William Brand
