= Thomas Lee (MP for Hertfordshire, 1386) =

English politician

Thomas Lee (died before 26 June 1391) was an English politician. He sat as MP for Hertfordshire in 1386.

He was probably the younger son of Sir John Lee and the brother of Sir Walter Lee. By June 1381, he married Joan.
