= Nicolson Calvert (1764–1841) =

English politician

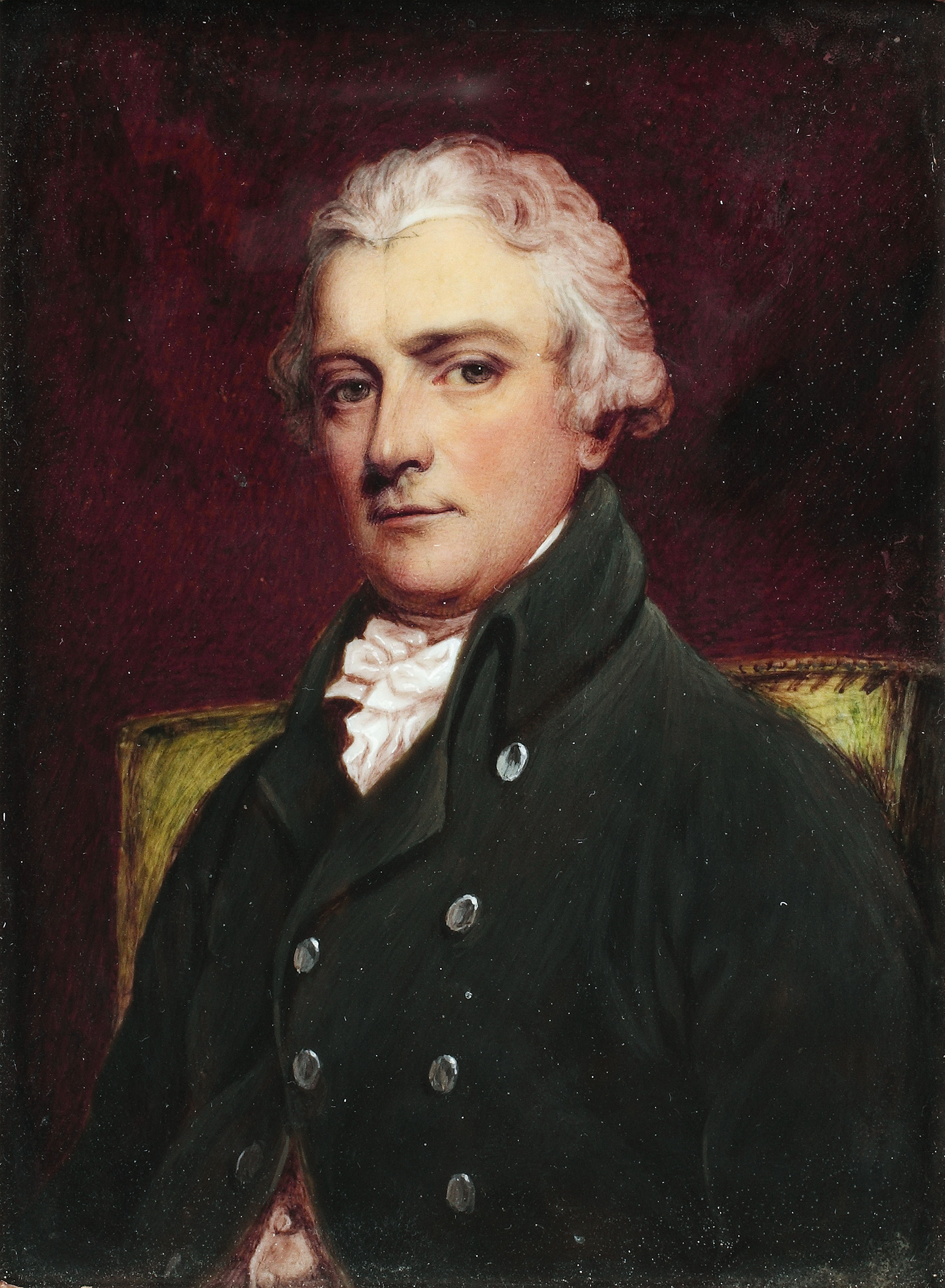
Nicholson Calvert (1764-1841)

Nicolson Calvert (15 May 1764 – 13 April 1841) was an English Whig politician.

== Life ==
The son of Felix Calvert, a brewer from Southwark and Hunsdon, he was educated at Harrow School and at Trinity Hall, Cambridge. In 1789 he married Frances Pery, daughter and co-heir of the 1st Viscount Pery, a powerful politician from Limerick in Ireland. They had six sons and two daughters. Their son, Felix (d. 1862), fought at the Battle of Waterloo while their second daughter Isabella (1793–1862) married Sir James Stronge, Bt. They lived at Hunsdon House in Hertfordshire, which he inherited from his uncle (also named Nicolson Calvert). His granddaughter Flora Louisa Calvert married Lt Col. Alfred Tippinge, and his great granddaughter Helena was the wife of Arthur Irwin Dasent.

== Career ==
He was a Member of Parliament (MP) for the borough of Hertford from 1802 to 1826, and for the county of Hertfordshire from 1826 to 1834. He commanded the Eastern Battalion, Hertfordshire Local Militia, when it was raised at Hertford in 1808.

Parliament of the United Kingdom
Preceded by John Calvert; Nathaniel Dimsdale	Member of Parliament for Hertford; 1802–1826; With: Edward Spencer Cowper 1802–17; Viscount Cranborne 1817–23; Thomas Byron from 1823	Succeeded by Thomas Byron; Thomas Slingsby Duncombe
Preceded by Hon. William Lamb; Sir John Sebright, Bt	Member of Parliament for Hertfordshire; 1826–1835; With: Sir John Sebright, Bt to 1835; Viscount Grimston from 1832	Succeeded by Viscount Grimston; Rowland Alston; Abel Smith
