= John Brocket (died 1558) =

English politician

Sir John Brocket (c. 1513–1558) was an English Member of Parliament.

He was the eldest son of John Brocket of Wheathampstead, Hertfordshire and succeeded his grandfather in 1532.

He may have been the junior Knight of the Shire (MP) for Hertfordshire in 1542. He was knighted in 1547 and acquired Brocket Hall in the early 1550s. He was re-elected MP for Hertfordshire in 1553 and 1555. He married Margaret, the daughter and heiress of William Bensted of Bennington, Hertfordshire and had 10 sons and 3 daughters.

He died in 1558 and left Brocket Hall to his son, John, to be possessed after the death of his wife.
