= Henry Cocke =

16th-century English politician

Sir Henry Cocke (1538 – 24 March 1610), of Broxbourne, Hertfordshire, was an English politician.

He was the eldest son of John Cock, the Master of Requests (1550–1552). The younger Cocke was educated at St. John’s College, Cambridge (Easter 1553), and at the Inner Temple (1559).

Cocke was a justice of the peace for Hertfordshire from 1569 and was appointed High Sheriff of Hertfordshire for 1574–75. From 1597 to 1610, he served as Cofferer of the Household, a senior position in the English Royal Household. As Cofferer, Cocke was paid £5,000 for the expenses of Prince Henry in the year 1607–1608.

He was elected a member (MP) of the Parliament of England for Downton in 1571, St. Albans in 1572, and Hertfordshire in 1584, 1586, and 1593. Cocke served as a deputy lieutenant for the county from 1575 and was knighted in 1577.

He married Ursula, the daughter and coheiress of James Bury of Hampton Poyle, Oxfordshire. By her, Cocke had a son (who predeceased him) and two daughters.
