= John Brocket (died 1598) =

English politician

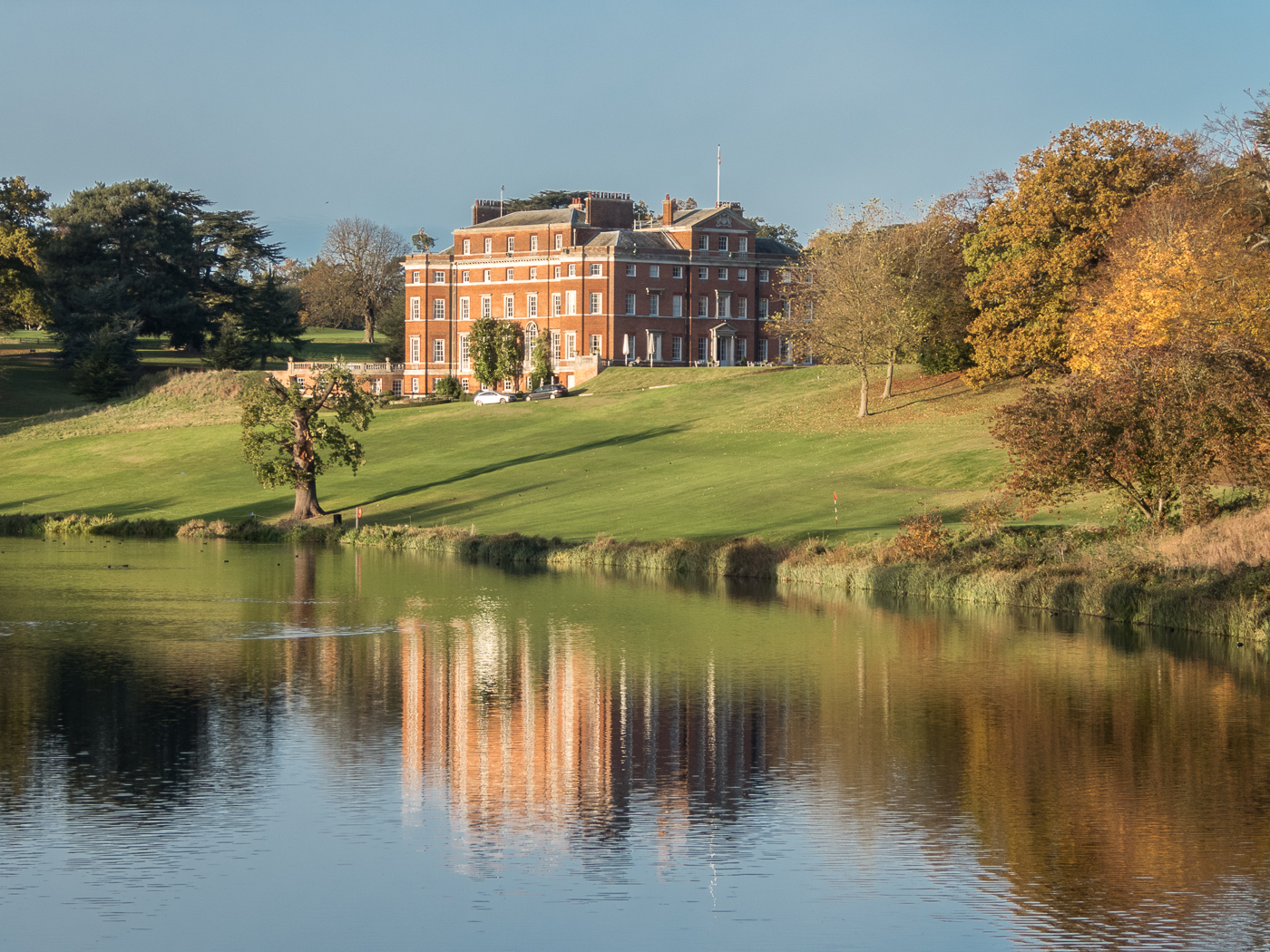
Brocket Hall, Hatfield, Hertfordshire, seat of Sir John Brocket

Sir John Brocket (c. 1540 – 2 October 1598) of Brocket Hall in Hertfordshire was an English politician. He was High Sheriff of Essex and Member of Parliament for Hertfordshire.

== Biography ==
John Brocket was the son of Sir John Brocket (1513–1558) and educated at Trinity College, Cambridge.

He succeeded his father in 1558 and was appointed High Sheriff of Essex and Hertfordshire for 1566–67. He was elected the secondary Member of Parliament for Hertfordshire in 1572. He was knighted in 1577.

The 1578 edition of Calvin's Lectures or Daily Sermons upon the Prophet Jonas, translated into English by Nathaniel Baxter contained a long dedication to him.

== Family ==
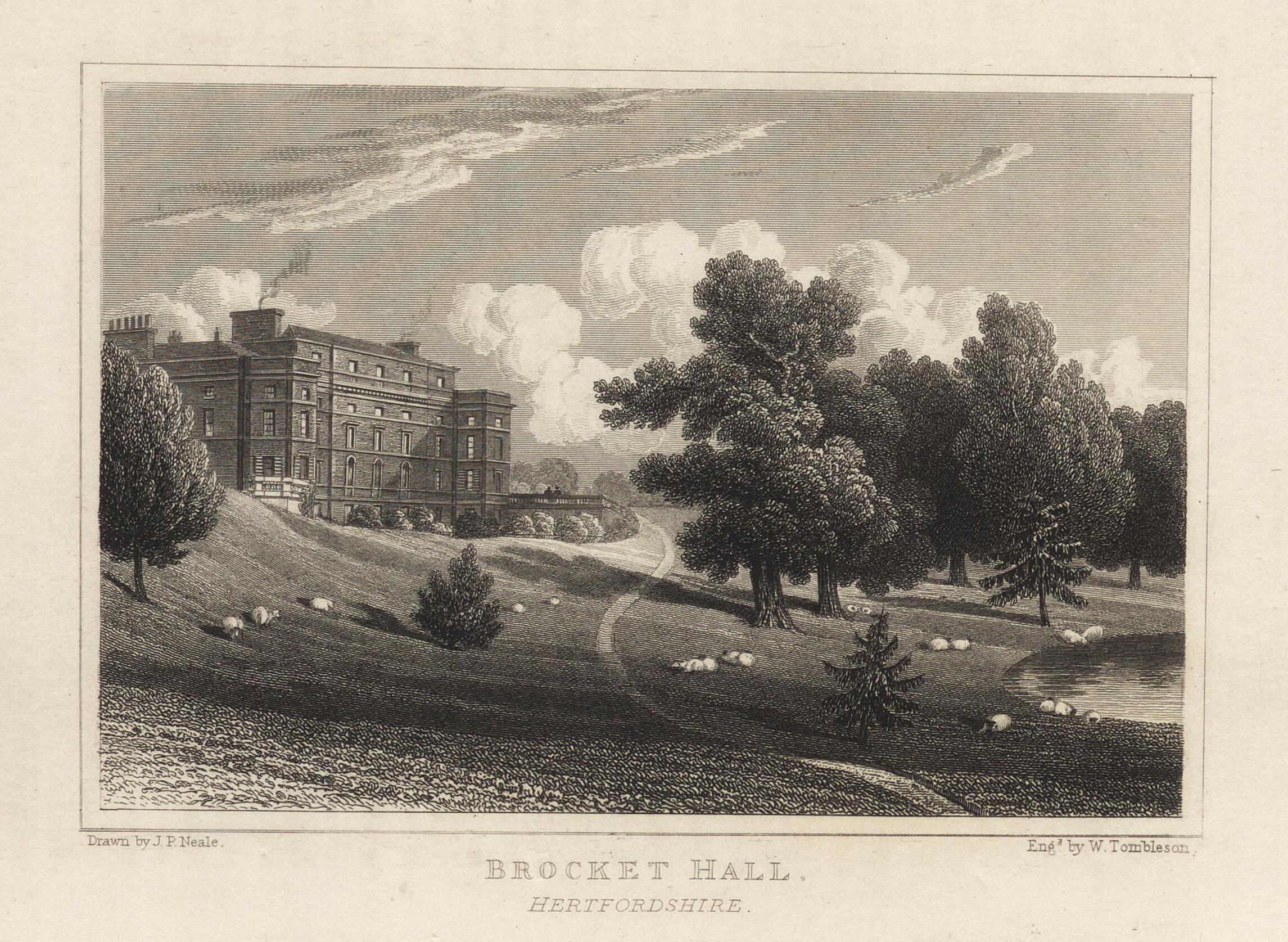
Engraving of Brocket Hall, Hatfield, Hertfordshire

Sir John married twice: firstly Helen, the daughter of Sir Robert Lytton of Knebworth, with whom he had 5 daughters and secondly Elizabeth, the daughter and coheiress of Roger Moore, and widow of Gabriel Fowler, with whom he had another daughter.

His daughter Frances Brockett married Dudley North, 3rd Baron North in 1599. North was the great-grandfather of Dudley North, the son-in-law of Elihu Yale, benefactor of Yale College.

He was father-in-law to Sir John Cutts MP).
