= John Leventhorpe =

Member of the Parliament of England

John Leventhorpe (c. 1370 – 1435), of Sawbridgeworth, Hertfordshire and Ugley, Essex, was an English politician and one of the executors of both Henry IV's and Henry V's wills.

== Life ==
Leventhorpe was born in Yorkshire in 1370. He was the son and heir of Robert Leventhorpe of Leventhorpe Hall and Swillington, Yorks. Leventhorpe's mother was named Isabel. By November 1392, he had married Katherine Riley (died 1437), with whom he fathered four sons.

He died in November 1435, after making his will on 29 January 1435, and was buried in Sawbridgeworth. His son Robert, who predeceased him, became member for Hertfordshire in 1425. His son and heir John also became member for Hertfordshire in 1467. On the floor of the south chapel of Great St Mary's church in Sawbridgeworth are brass figures, said to be of John Leventhorpe and his wife, with the arms of France and England quartered but with no inscription.

== Career ==
Leventhorpe was a Member of Parliament for Hertfordshire in May 1413, March 1416 and 1422.

Leventhorpe was a servant of the house of Lancaster and a member of Henry earl of Derby's household, and Henry appointed Leventhorpe as his attorney. He was granted the manor of Ugley in Essex, and in 1399 he became constable of Odiham castle and keeper of the royal manor there. In October 1401, he became guardian in England of Henry's son, Thomas of Lancaster. By March 1404, he had taken possession of a number of houses belonging to the duchy in Sawbridgeworth, including purchasing the manor of Shingle Hall from William Wyot in August 1400, and, by 1416, he owned the manor of Thorley. He also held the manors of Chaureth and Hassobury in Farnham. In 1413 (until 1429), he became an executor of Henry IV's will. Before his death, Henry exempted him from holding office in local government or serving as a shire knight.

Henry V confirmed all of the grants and appointments awarded to Leventhorpe by his father, and Leventhorpe was also an executor of his will (sharing the distinction of being executor of both kings' wills with Thomas Langley, bishop of Durham). He also acted, in partnership with son John, as surveyor of the property entrusted to their care.

The Leventhorpe Academy in Sawbridgeworth is named after the Leventhorpe family.

== See also ==
- Leventhorpe baronets
