= Brocket Hall =

Country house in Hertfordshire, England

Coordinates: 51.801°N 0.246°W

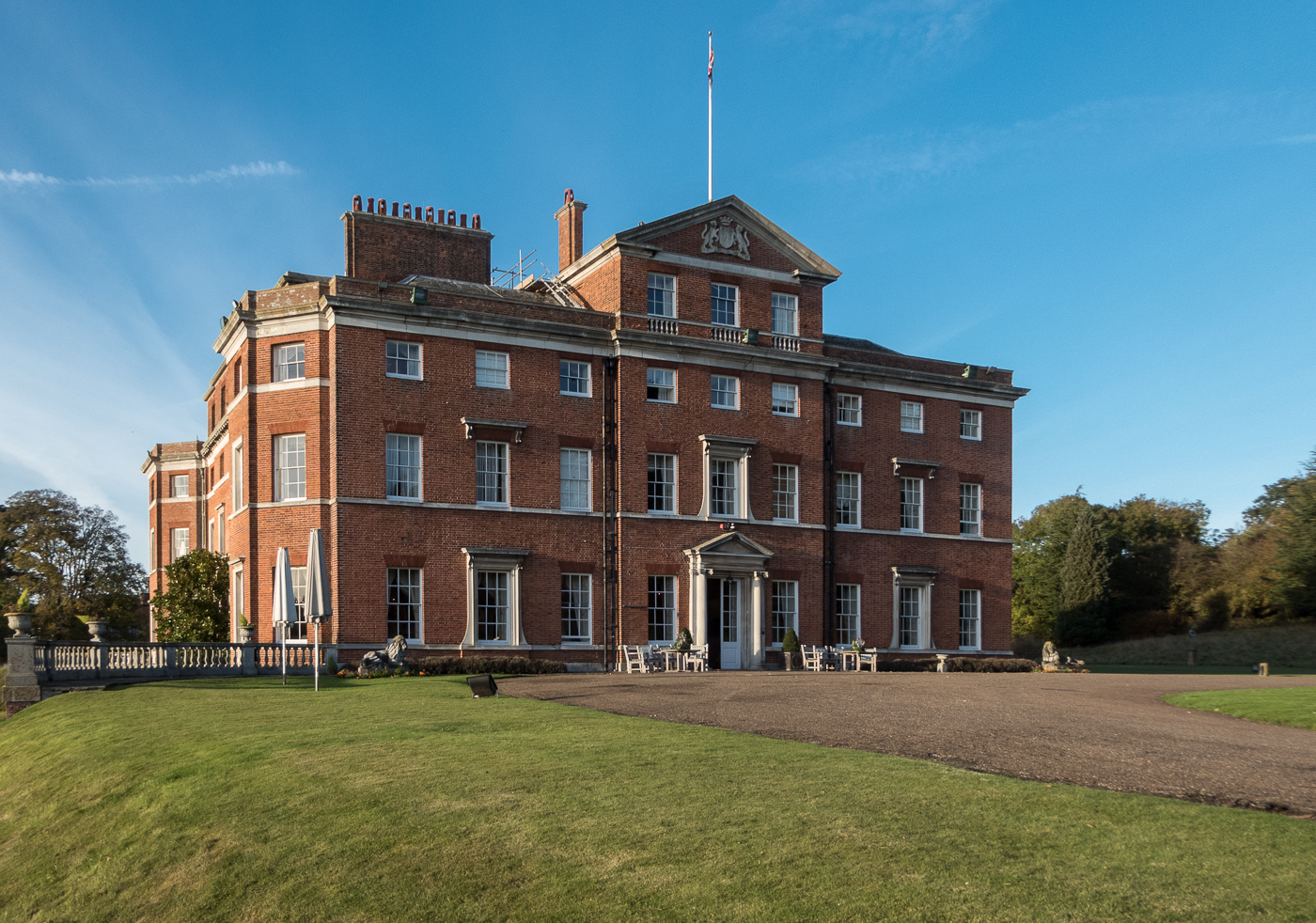
Brocket Hall, main (north) façade

Brocket Hall is a neo-classical country house set in a large park at the western side of the urban area of Welwyn Garden City in Hertfordshire, England. The estate includes two golf courses and seven smaller listed buildings, apart from the main house. The freehold of the estate is held by the 3rd Baron Brocket. The house is Grade I listed.

== History ==
On the parkland site were two predecessors: the first of these was built in 1239 as Watership or Durantshide Manor, and was early held variously of Hatfield Manor and the Bishop of Ely. (Note: The expression "held of" is frequently seen in local histories of all parishes of England and much of Western Europe and means held on a lease, which could be forfeited through for example attainder or non-payment of the agreed rent.) A second predecessor was built about 1430: whereas in 1413 John Mortimer had held Waterships, it is known that in 1477 Thomas Brockett held both manors. The house was acquired by John Brocket in the early 1550s, and passed to his son Sir John Brocket (captain of the personal guard of Queen Elizabeth) on his death in 1558.

The building and park owe much of their appearance today to Sir Matthew Lamb, 1st Baronet, who purchased the estate in 1746 and commissioned Brocket Hall to the designs of the architect Sir James Paine in around 1760.

Sir Matthew Lamb's son was Peniston Lamb, 1st Viscount Melbourne, and he was often visited at Brocket Hall by the Prince Regent, who had a liaison with Lady Melbourne.

The next owner was William Lamb, 2nd Viscount Melbourne, who was Queen Victoria's first Prime Minister (1835–41). She often visited during this period. His wife, Lady Caroline Lamb, infamously had an affair with Lord Byron, causing Lord Melbourne much embarrassment. For one of his birthdays she held a state banquet in the Saloon, at which she had herself served from a large silver tureen, naked.

On Lamb's death, the house passed to his sister Emily, whose second husband was another Prime Minister, Lord Palmerston. Palmerston died at Brocket Hall in 1865, the last UK prime minister to die in office.

On Emily's death, the hall then passed to Emily's grandson by her first marriage, Francis Cowper, 7th Earl Cowper, though it was his younger brother, Henry (d.1887), who lived at Brocket Hall.

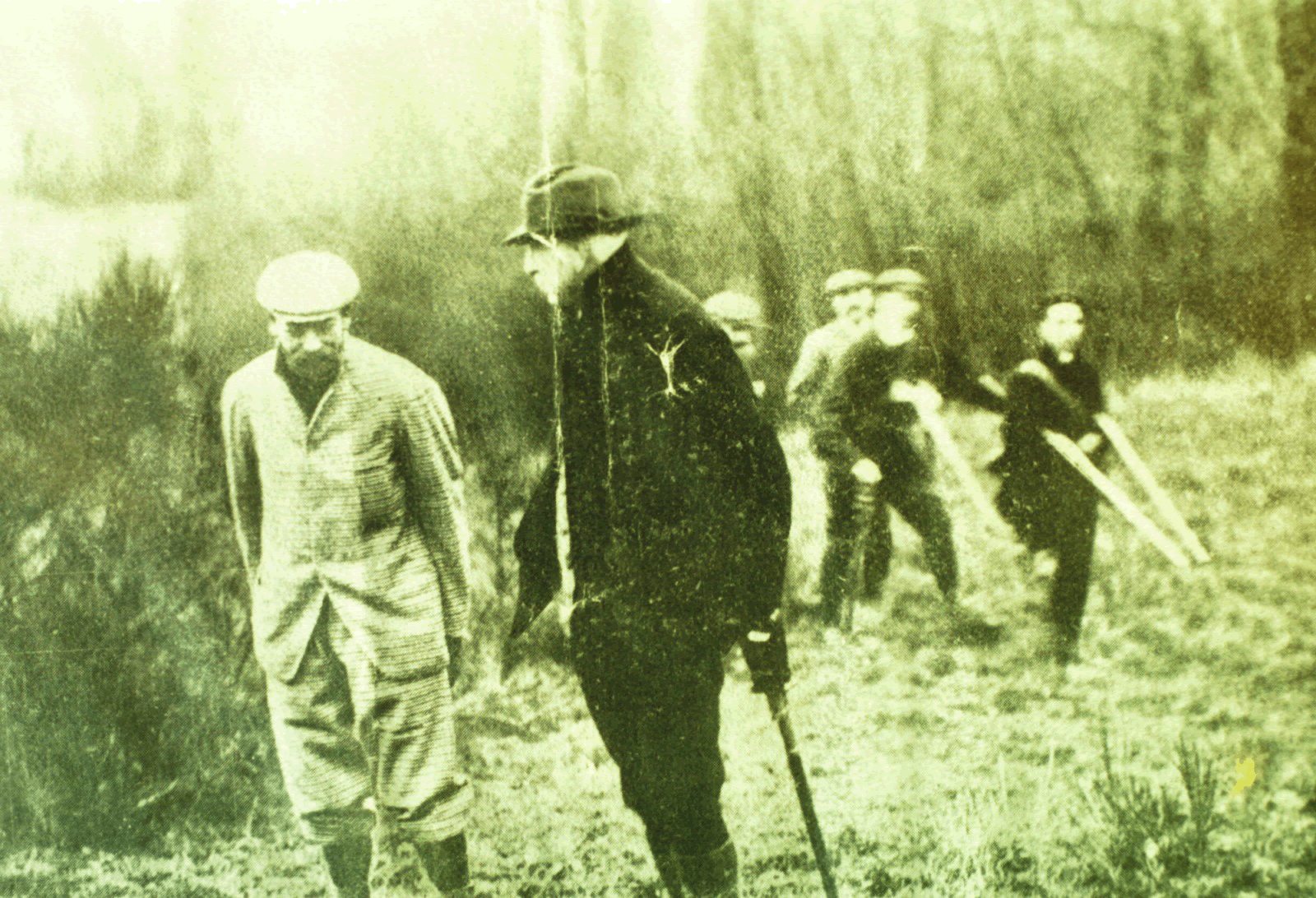
Lord Mount Stephen and King George V at a shoot hosted by Mount Stephen at Brocket Hall

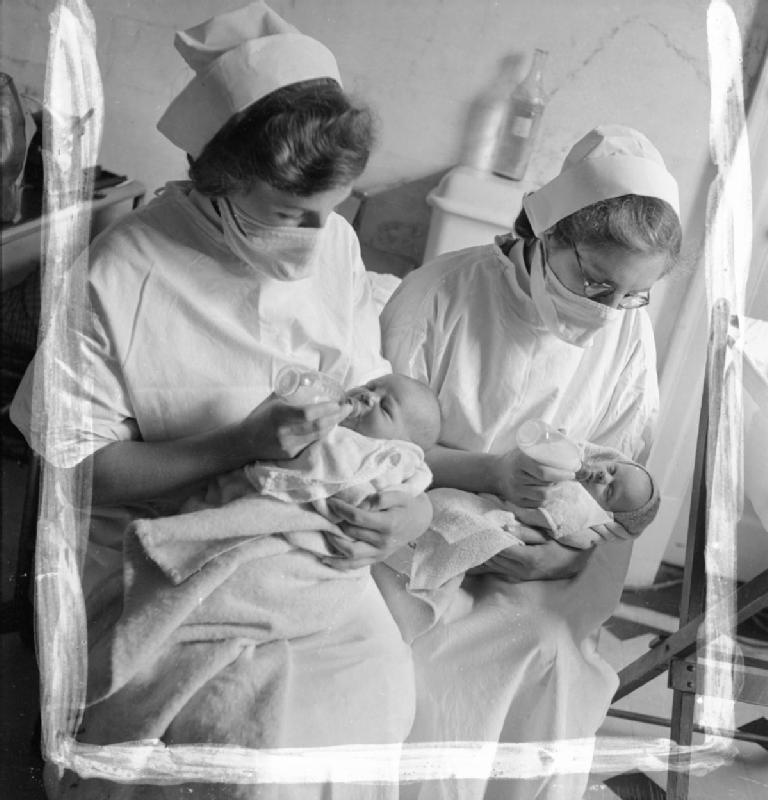
Brocket Hall as a maternity home in 1942

In 1893, George Stephen, 1st Baron Mount Stephen, President of the Bank of Montreal and the first Canadian to be elevated to the Peerage of the United Kingdom, leased Brocket Hall from the 7th Earl for the remainder of his lifetime. Over the next three years, guests included the Queen's children: The Prince and Princess of Wales, The Duke and Duchess of Connaught and the Princess Mary, Duchess of Teck. In 1897, one year after his first wife died in 1896, Lord Mount Stephen married Georgina Mary (known as Gian) Tufnell, a Lady-in-Waiting to Princess Mary Adelaide, Duchess of Teck, who encouraged the match. Gian was a lifelong friend and confidante of the Duchess's daughter, Mary of Teck, the wife of King George V, and the Mount Stephenses regularly entertained the royal couple. Gian preferred life at Brocket Hall to the social life that surrounded their London residence at Carlton House Terrace. Lady Mount Stephen was a close friend of Georgina Gascoyne-Cecil, Marchioness of Salisbury, who lived on the neighbouring estate, Hatfield House.

After the death of the 7th Earl Cowper (1905), the underlying future reversion was left to his niece, but she died only a year after him (1906) and the estate passed to her husband, Admiral Lord Walter Kerr, who lived at Melbourne Hall. When the life tenant Lord Mount Stephen died in 1921, Kerr put the estate up for sale, and in 1923 it was purchased by Sir Charles Nall-Cain, who co-ran the brewing company Walker Cain Ltd; he was created Baron Brocket in 1933. His son, Ronald Nall-Cain, 2nd Baron Brocket, was a Nazi sympathiser; he was interned during the Second World War, and his property was sequestrated and put to use as a maternity hospital.

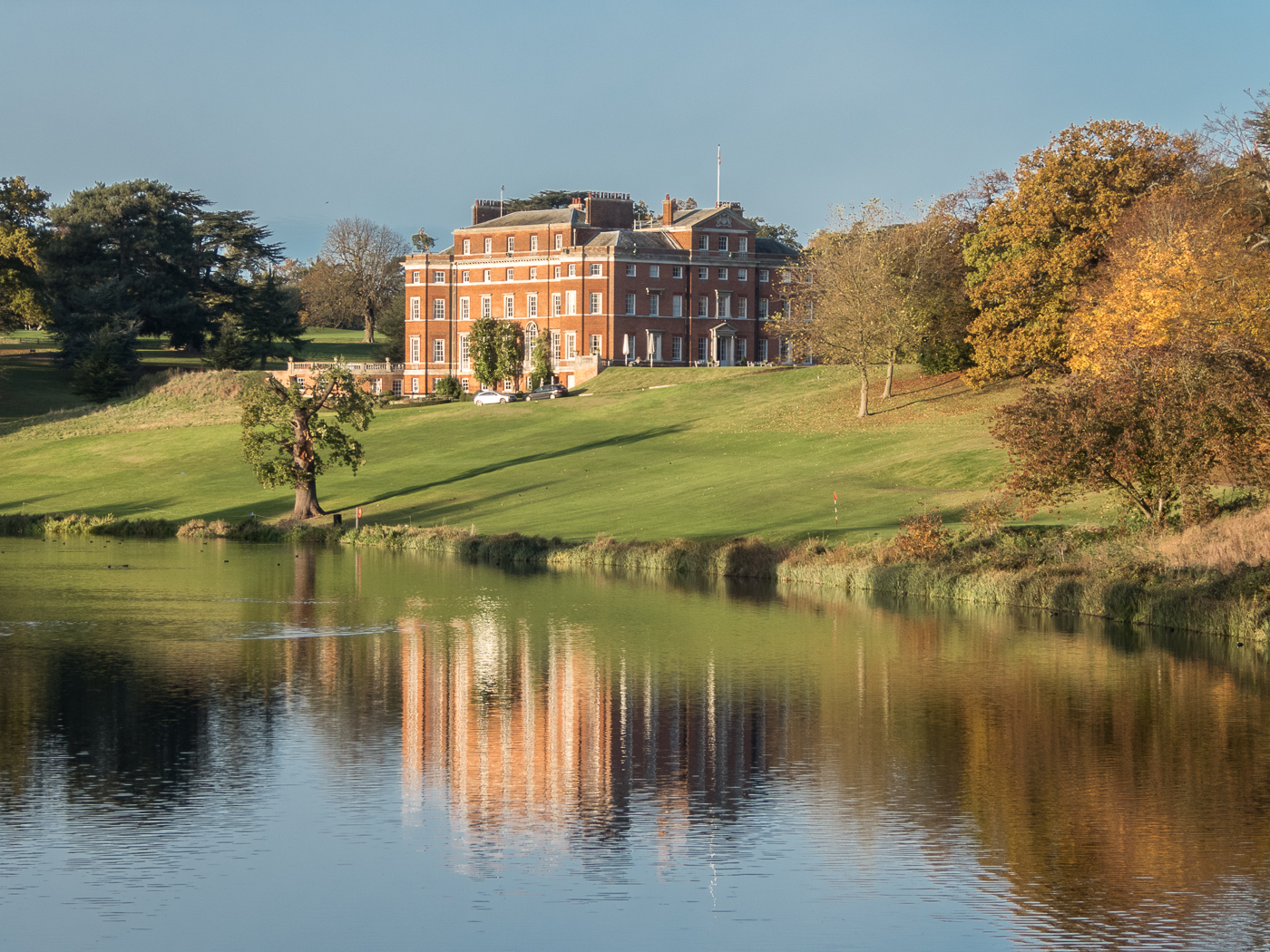
The Broadwater and Brocket Hall

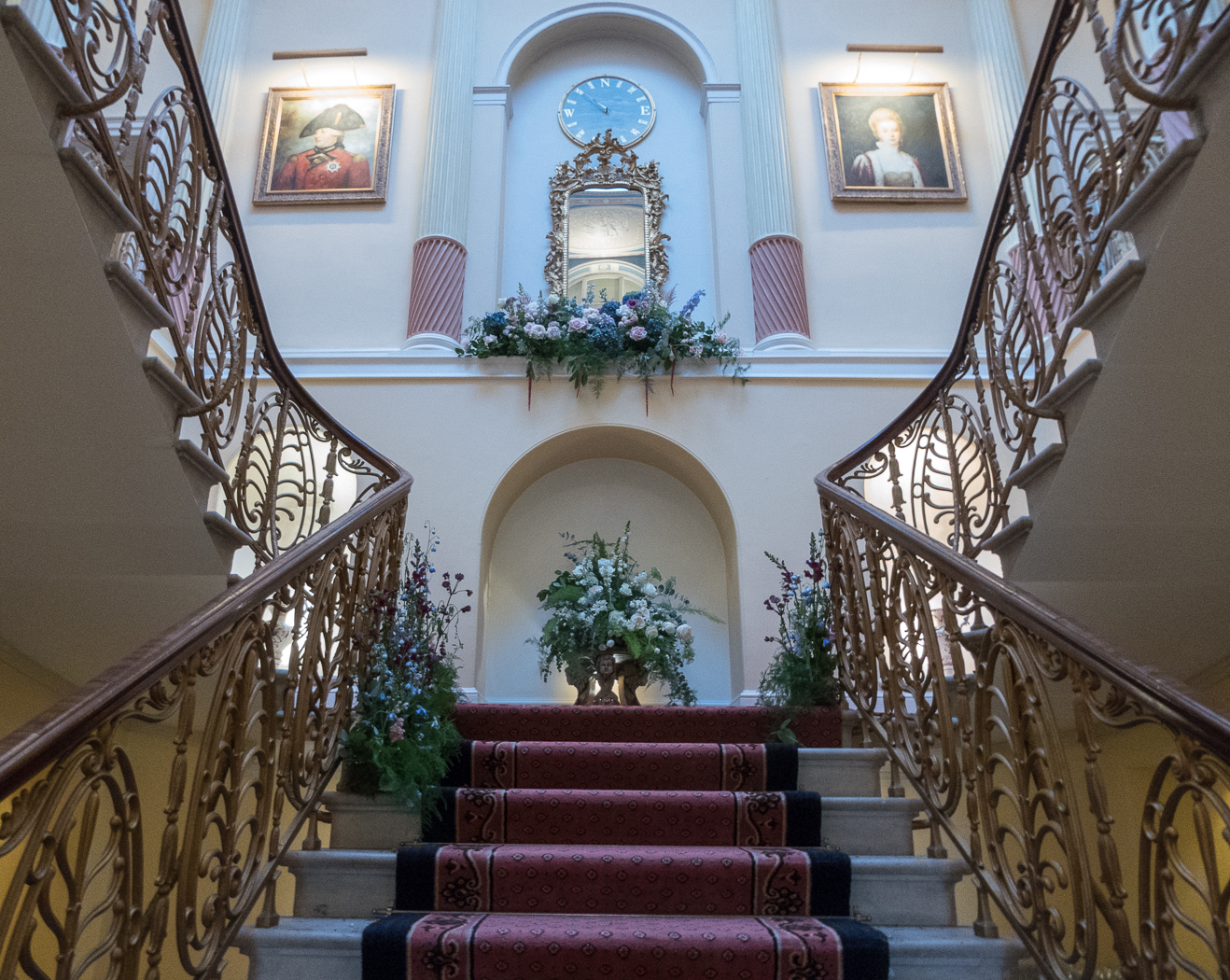
Inside Brocket Hall

In 1996 Charles Nall-Cain, 3rd Baron Brocket (often styled as Charlie Brocket) was convicted of insurance fraud.

== Location ==
The estate almost touches the A1(M) motorway near Welwyn Garden City which is on the opposite side of the motorway; administratively and historically it lies at the extreme northern end of Hatfield.

== Park and lake ==
In the 1770s the park was landscaped making use of the River Lea which is dammed to form a "broadwater" or lake. Next to the weir is a neoclassical bridge, often described as Palladian, which carries an approach drive across the river: it is faced in Portland stone and was designed by Paine.

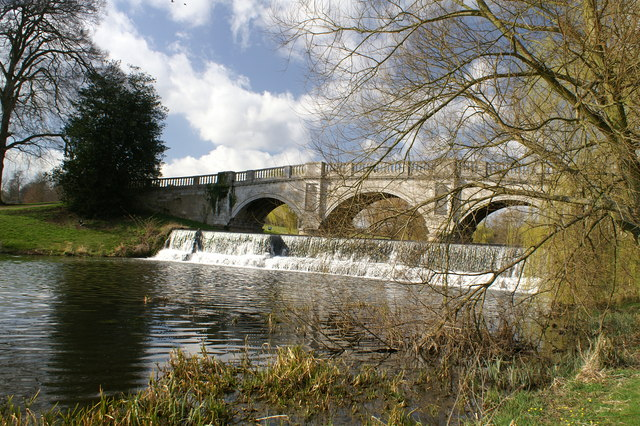
The Palladian bridge at Brocket Hall

The park is listed as Grade II in the Register of Historic Parks and Gardens. The parkland is since the mid-1990s largely overlain by golf courses and is bounded by substantial woodland belts.

Paine also built the Temple with an Adam-style plaster ceiling, elliptical porch that has niches either side of a Victorian period half glazed door and a pediment above its eastern entrance, typical of the finest garden temples of the era.

Among other buildings on the estate is Brocket Lea, an early 17th-century house on the south side of the river Lea.

== In popular culture ==
Brocket Hall has been used as a filming location for film and television productions, and for music videos, including: Night of the Demon (1957), Murder with Mirrors, Johnny English Reborn, The Queen, Willow, and Pride and Prejudice featuring Colin Firth. It also was featured in the Inspector Morse episode, "Who Killed Harry Field?" (1991); in the Agatha Christie's Poirot episode "The Labours of Hercules" (2013); in an episode of EastEnders screened on 1 January 2017; in Holby City and in the TV series Victoria.

The hall was used in the Shakin' Stevens video "You Drive Me Crazy" in 1980 and in 1983, for Mike Oldfield's "Moonlight Shadow". The British pop group Steps used it as the location for their 2001 music video for "It's the Way You Make Me Feel".
