= Sir John Sebright, 7th Baronet =

English politician and agricultural innovator

Sir John Saunders Sebright, 7th Baronet, DL (23 May 1767 – 15 April 1846), of Besford, Worcestershire, and Beechwood Park, Hertfordshire, was an English politician and agricultural innovator.

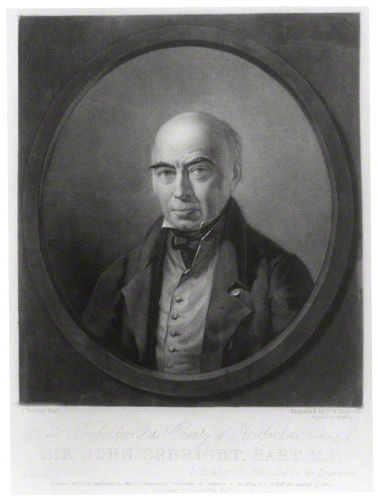
Sir John Sebright, 7th Baronet, 1834 engraving by Samuel William Reynolds.

== Life ==
Born on 23 May 1767 in Sackville Street, St. James's, he was the eldest son of Sir John Sebright, 6th Baronet, by Sarah, daughter of Edward Knight, of Wolverley, Worcestershire. His father died in March 1794.

The seventh baronet served for a short time in the Foot Guards and was attached to the staff of Lord Amherst. He was elected M.P. for Hertfordshire on 11 May 1807, and continued to represent the county till the end of the first reformed parliament. He was appointed High Sheriff of Hertfordshire for 1797–98. He commanded the Western Battalion, Hertfordshire Local Militia, when it was raised at St Albans in 1808.

== Parliamentarian ==
Sebright disclaimed connection with a party, but generally acted with the more advanced Whigs. He was a strong advocate of economy in administration, of the abolition of sinecures and unnecessary offices, and of the reduction of indirect taxation. He was in principle a free-trader.

On 5 April 1821 he seconded Lord Cranborne's motion for an inquiry into the game laws, and supported subsequent bills for their amendment. In 1826 he attributed the increase of crime chiefly to their influence. In 1824, and again in 1828, he spoke in favour of the repeal of the usury laws, and he 'detested monopolies of all kinds.'

As a practical agriculturist, owning land in three counties, Sebright gave his opinion (17 December 1830) against any allotments larger than kitchen-gardens, but was willing to try an experiment on a larger scale.

When, on 1 March 1831, Lord John Russell moved for leave to bring in the first Reform Bill, Sebright, as an independent member, seconded the motion; and supported this and the succeeding reform bills. On 17 December 1832 he was returned for Hertfordshire, at the head of the poll, to the first reformed parliament, but retired at its close.

== Death and legacy ==
He died on 15 April 1846 at Turnham Green and was buried at Flamstead. A portrait of him was engraved by S. Reynolds from a painting by Boileau. He built and endowed a school at Cheverell's Green, and a row of almshouses for sixteen paupers in the parish of Flamstead, Hertfordshire, where some of the family property lay. The Sebright bantam, which he created, is named after him and remains a popular breed of chicken to this day.

== Works ==
In 1809 he published a letter to Sir Joseph Banks on The Art of Improving the Breeds of Domestic Animals. Sebright was also author of Observations on Hawking, describing the mode of breaking and managing several kinds of hawks used in falconry, 1826; and of Observations upon the Instinct of Animals, 1836. Charles Darwin commented on Sebright's practical skill as a breeder in The Variation of Animals and Plants Under Domestication.

== Family ==
He married, on 6 August 1793, Harriet, heiress of Richard Crofts of West Harling, Norfolk. She died in August 1826, having borne nine children:

- Sir Thomas Gage Saunders Sebright, 8th Baronet (1802–1864). He married Lady Sarah Anne Hoffmann (12 September 1809 - 14 February 1846), daughter of Frederick Hoffman, Esq., Capt R.N. (author of "A Sailor of King George: The Journals of Captain Frederick Hoffman, RN, 1793-1814"). Lady Sarah Anne is buried in the English Cemetery, Florence.
- Frederica Anne Sebright
- Emily Sebright (d. 1822), married Frederick Franks in 1822
- Caroline Sebright
- Frances Elizabeth Sebright
- Sophia Sebright (d. 1829), unmarried
- Mary Anne Sebright
- Octavia Elinor Sebright
- Gertrude Sebright (11 Aug 1807 – 1820)

== See also ==
- Sebright (chicken)

== Notes ==
Attribution

This article incorporates text from a publication now in the public domain: "Sebright, John Saunders". Dictionary of National Biography. London: Smith, Elder & Co. 1885–1900.

Parliament of the United Kingdom
Preceded by William Plumer; William Baker	Member of Parliament for Hertfordshire; 1807–1835; With: Hon. Thomas Brand 1807–1819; Hon. William Lamb 1819–1826; Nicolson Calvert 1826–1835; Viscount Grimston 1832–1835	Succeeded by Viscount Grimston; Abel Smith; Rowland Alston
Honorary titles
Preceded by John Sowerby	High Sheriff of Hertfordshire; 1797–1798	Succeeded by Felix Calvert
Baronetage of England
Preceded by John Sebright	Baronet (of Besford); 1794–1846	Succeeded by Thomas Sebright
