= Rowland Alston (1782–1865) =

English politician (1782–1865)

- Born: 7 June 1782
- Died: 21 November 1865 (aged 83)
- Occupation: Politician
- Known for: Member of Parliament for Hertfordshire

Rowland Alston (7 June 1782 – 21 November 1865) was an English Whig politician.

He was a Member of Parliament (MP) for Hertfordshire from 1835 to 1841. He lived at Pishiobury, Sawbridgeworth, Hertfordshire.

Parliament of the United Kingdom
Preceded by Viscount Grimston; Nicolson Calvert; Sir John Sebright, Bt	Member of Parliament for Hertfordshire; 1835–1841; With: Abel Smith; Viscount Grimston	Succeeded by Viscount Grimston; Abel Smith; Granville Ryder
