= James Grimston, 2nd Earl of Verulam =

British peer and politician (1809–1895)

James Walter Grimston, 2nd Earl of Verulam (20 February 1809 – 27 July 1895), known as Viscount Grimston from 1815 to 1845, was a British peer and Conservative politician. He was the eldest son of James Walter Grimston, 1st Earl of Verulam, and Lady Charlotte Jenkinson. He succeeded his father as 2nd Earl of Verulam in November 1845.

In 1860, The Times noted that Grimston was one of only three to hold peerages in all three Kingdoms of England, Scotland and Ireland.

== Family ==
Lord Verulam married Elizabeth Joanna Weyland, daughter of Richard Weyland, in 1844. They had six children:

- Lady Harriot Elizabeth Grimston (c.1845 – 15 August 1888), married Maj.-Gen. Francis Harwood Poore on 6 March 1885
- Lady Jane Grimston (12 December 1848 – 2 November 1920), married Sir Alfred Jodrell, 4th Baronet on 25 February 1897
- James Walter Grimston, 3rd Earl of Verulam (1852–1924)
- Cmdr. William Grimston (7 January 1855 – 10 May 1900)
- Lady Maud Grimston (c.1857 – 3 September 1929), married Maj. Paulyn Rawdon-Hastings, son of the 1st Baron Donington and the 10th Countess of Loudoun, and had issue
- Canon Robert Grimston (18 April 1860 – 8 July 1928), married Gertrude Villiers and had issue, including the Conservative politician Robert Grimston, 1st Baron Grimston of Westbury.

Lord Verulam died in July 1895, aged 86, and was succeeded in his titles by his eldest son James.

== Politics and business ==
Verulam was elected to the House of Commons for St Albans in 1830, a seat he held until 1831, and then represented Newport, Cornwall from 1831 to 1832 and Hertfordshire from 1832 to 1845. The latter year Verulam succeeded his father in the earldom and entered the House of Lords. He later served in the first two administrations of the Earl of Derby as a Lord-in-waiting (government whip in the House of Lords) in 1852 and from 1858 to 1859. Between 1845 and 1892 he also held the honorary post of Lord Lieutenant of Hertfordshire, in succession to his father.

During a period of unrest in 1830 he raised the Cashio Troop of Hertfordshire Yeomanry Cavalry at the family seat of Gorhambury House and commanded it with the rank of captain. In 1832 it became a troop of the South Hertfordshire Yeomanry Cavalry, of which he became second-in-command with the rank of major. He was promoted to lieutenant-colonel in 1847 when he and the commanding officer, James Gascoyne-Cecil, 2nd Marquess of Salisbury, exchanged positions. He retained the command until 1864

== Cricket and other sport ==
Verulam played as a right-handed batsman. He was mainly associated with Marylebone Cricket Club (MCC), making 21 appearances from 1830 to 1849. In contemporary scorecards to 1845, he was given as Lord Grimston. He was also a supporter of the boxing arts and in the early 1850s, he and his brother Robert frequented middleweight champion Nat Langham's Rum Pum-Pas club, a dining and boxing establishment in Westminster popular with the aristocracy.

Several members of his family were cricketers: three of his brothers Edward, Robert and Francis all played, as did his nephews Walter Grimston and Lord Hyde.

== Folklore Society ==
Verulam was the first President of the Folklore Society, serving in the role between 1878 and 1879. It has been suggested that Verulam - like the second and third Presidents of the Society, Frederick Lygon, 6th Earl Beauchamp and George Byng, 3rd Earl of Strafford - was not a folklore scholar but lent his patronage to the Society through the efforts of W. J. Thoms, Director of the Society but known to Verulam as deputy librarian of the House of Lords.

== Notes ==
Parliament of the United Kingdom
Preceded by Christopher Smith; John Easthope	Member of Parliament for St Albans; 1830–1831; With: Charles Tennant	Succeeded by Sir Francis Vincent; Richard Godson
Preceded by Jonathan Raine; Sir Henry Hardinge	Member of Parliament for Newport, Cornwall; 1831–1832; With: Sir Henry Hardinge	Constituency abolished
Preceded by Sir John Sebright; Nicolson Calvert	Member of Parliament for Hertfordshire; 1832–1845; With: Sir John Sebright 1832–35; Nicolson Calvert 1832–35; Abel Smith 1835–45; Rowland Alston 1835–41; Granville Ryder 1841–45	Succeeded by Abel Smith; Granville Ryder; Thomas Plumer Halsey
Political offices
Preceded by ?	Lord-in-waiting; 1852	Succeeded by The Lord Camoys
Honorary titles
Preceded by The Earl of Verulam	Lord Lieutenant of Hertfordshire; 1846–1892	Succeeded by The Earl of Clarendon
Peerage of the United Kingdom
Preceded by James Grimston	Earl of Verulam; 1845–1895	Succeeded by James Grimston
