= Abel Smith (politician, born 1829) =

English landowner and politician

Smith in 1895.

Arms of Smith: Or, a chevron cotised sable between three demi-griffins couped of the last the two in chief respecting each other

Abel Smith JP (30 December 1829 – 30 May 1898) was an English landowner of the Smith banking family and Conservative politician.

Smith was the son of Abel Smith and his wife Frances Anne Calvert. His father was MP for various constituencies, and his mother was the daughter of General Sir Harry Calvert.

Smith was elected member of parliament (MP) for Hertfordshire in 1854 but lost the seat in 1857. His father died in 1859 and he inherited the 11,000-acre (45 km^{2}) estate of Woodhall Park, Hertfordshire, and various other properties. He was re-elected for Hertfordshire in 1859 and lost the seat again in 1865.

In 1866 he was elected for Hertfordshire again, holding the seat until the constituency was abolished in 1885. In 1885 he was elected MP for Hertford, and held the seat until his death. Smith was also lord of the manor of Rennesley and justice of the peace.

Smith married Lady Susan Emma Pelham, daughter of Henry Pelham, 3rd Earl of Chichester, on 7 April 1853. Their son Abel Henry Smith was subsequently MP for Hertford.

Parliament of the United Kingdom
Preceded by Thomas Plumer Halsey; Sir Henry Meux; Sir Edward Bulwer-Lytton	Member of Parliament for Hertfordshire; 1854–1857; With: Sir Henry Meux; Sir Edward Bulwer-Lytton	Succeeded by Christopher William Puller; Sir Henry Meux; Sir Edward Bulwer-Lytton
Preceded by Christopher William Puller; Sir Henry Meux; Sir Edward Bulwer-Lytton	Member of Parliament for Hertfordshire; 1859–1865; With: Christopher William Puller 1859–1864; Henry Surtees 1864–1865; Sir Edward Bulwer-Lytton 1859–1865	Succeeded by Henry Surtees; Henry Cowper; Sir Edward Bulwer-Lytton
Preceded by Henry Surtees; Henry Cowper; Sir Edward Bulwer-Lytton	Member of Parliament for Hertfordshire; 1866–1885; With: Henry Surtees 1866–1868; Henry Brand 1868–1874; Frederick Halsey 1874–1885; Henry Cowper 1866–1885	Constituency abolished
Preceded by Arthur Balfour	Member of Parliament for Hertford; 1885–1898	Succeeded by Evelyn Cecil
