= John Cock (MP) =

English politician

John Cock (by 1506 – 6 September 1557), of London and Broxbourne, Hertfordshire, was an English politician.

He was the son of William Cock of Broxbourne and studied law at the Inner Temple.

He was attorney-general to the Duchy of Cornwall from 1532 to his death. He sat on the bench for Hertfordshire as a justice of the peace from 1540, probably to his death. He was attorney to Queen Catherine Parr in 1543 and was High Sheriff of Essex and Hertfordshire for 1548–49. He was Master of Requests for 1550–1553 and a Privy Councillor in March 1552.

He was elected a member (MP) of the Parliament of England for Hertfordshire in 1545, 1547, March 1533, April 1554, November 1554 and 1555 and for Calne in 1547.

He married Anne, the daughter of Thomas Goodere of Hadley, Hertfordshire and had 3 sons and 2 daughters. He was succeeded by his son Henry.
