= John Barley (MP) =

English politician (died 1446)

John Barley (died 12 February 1446) was an English politician. He sat as MP for Hertfordshire in 1420, 1423 and 1429.

== Family ==
He was the son and heir of John Barley (died 1420) by his wife Joan (died 1419), the sister and co-heiress of Sir Walter Lee. By 1419, he was married to Katherine Walden (1400–1466), the sister and co-heiress of John Walden (died 1419) and they had at least one son, Henry Barley.

== Political career ==
He also served as justice of the peace of Hertfordshire from 7 July 1423 till December 1443 and 9 June 1445 till his death; Sheriff of Essex and Hertfordshire from 6 November 1424 till 15 January 1426; commissioner to raise royal loans in Hertfordshire and Essex in March 1430 and March 1431; commissioner to assess grants and taxes in Hertfordshire in April 1431, January 1436; commissioner of inquiry concerning concealments and escapes in May 1436; commissioner to collect part of a tax in February 1441; and escheator of Essex and Hertfordshire from 26 November 1431 till 5 November 1432.
