= Sir John Spencer, 4th Baronet =

English politician

Sir John Spencer, 4th Baronet (c. 1650 – 16 November 1712) was an English Whig politician, lawyer and peer. He sat as MP for Hertfordshire from 1705 till 1708.

He was the second surviving son of Sir Brockett Spencer, 1st Baronet and Susanna, the daughter of Sir Nicholas Carew. He was educated at Magdalen Hall, Oxford and matriculated on 12 July 1667, at the age of 17. He entered the Inner Temple in 1668 and was called to the bar in 1675. He succeeded his nephew, Sir John Spencer, 3rd Baronet as Baronet in August 1699.
