= Granville Ryder (1799–1879) =

British Tory politician

The Honourable Granville Dudley Ryder JP (26 November 1799 – 24 November 1879), was a British Tory politician.

Ryder was the second son of Dudley Ryder, 1st Earl of Harrowby, and his wife, the former Lady Susanna Leveson-Gower, daughter of Granville Leveson-Gower, 1st Marquess of Stafford. A graduate of Trinity College, Cambridge, he served in the Royal Navy and achieved the rank of Lieutenant. He later sat as Member of Parliament for Tiverton from 1830 to 1832 and for Hertfordshire from 1841 to 1847. He also served as a Justice of the Peace for Hertfordshire.

Ryder married his first cousin, Lady Georgiana Augusta, daughter of Henry Somerset, 6th Duke of Beaufort, in 1825. They had seven daughters and six sons. Their eldest son, Dudley Henry Ryder, was an ancestor of the 20th-century sailor and politician Robert Ryder. Their second son, Granville Ryder, was a politician. A younger son, Henry Stuart Ryder, was a junior officer in the Rifle Brigade and was killed at the Battle of the Great Redan in 1855.

Lady Georgiana Ryder died in March 1865. Ryder survived her by fourteen years and died in November 1879, at age 79.

== Family ==
The Hon. Granville Dudley Ryder married Lady Georgiana Augusta Somerset, daughter of Henry Somerset, 6th Duke of Beaufort, on 30 May 1825 and had 13 children.

- Georgiana Susan Ryder, b. 10 June 1826, d. 27 June 1826
- Susan Georgiana Ryder, b. 7 July 1827, d. 31 January 1901, married Colonel Philip James of Tarrant, Dorset, son of Lt Col William James and Caroline Gordon (daughter of John Wallop, Viscount Lymington) on 3 August 1844, they had three children.
- Dudley Henry Ryder, b. 7 February 1830, d. 8 September 1911, married Georgiana Emily Calcroft, daughter of John Hales Calcraft on 1 December 1857, they had nine children.
- Charlotte Mary Ryder, b. 8 October 1831
- Granville Ryder, b. 22 September 1833, d. 3 August 1901, married Sybilla Sophia Grant, daughter of Sir Robert Grant on 19 March 1864, died without issue.
- Henry Stuart Ryder, b. 10 February 1835, d. 8 September 1855, died in action and unmarried.
- Francis Edward Ryder, b. 24 October 1836
- Georgiana Henrietta Frederica Ryder, b. 24 August 1838 (twin)
- Augusta Louisa Ryder, b. 24 August 1838 (twin)
- Isabella Sophia Ann Ryder, b. 19 June 1841, married 1868 William Moore, son of Mr. Justice Richard Moore, d.1884
- A daughter, b. 3 September 1843, d. 1 November 1843
- A son, b. 13 September 1844

== Ancestry ==
Ancestors of Granville Ryder (1799–1879)

16. Richard Ryder
8. Sir Dudley Ryder
17. Elizabeth Marshall
4. Nathaniel Ryder, 1st Baron Harrowby
18. Nathaniel Newnham, Esq. of Streatham
9. Anne Newnham
19. Honoria Kett
2. Dudley Ryder, 1st Earl of Harrowby
20. Rev. Samuel Terrick
10. Richard Terrick, Bishop of London
21. Ann Gibson
5. Elizabeth Terrick
22. Sir William Stainforth
11. Tabitha Stainforth
23. Frances Prickett
1. Hon. Granville Dudley Ryder
24. John Leveson-Gower, 1st Baron Gower
12. John Leveson-Gower, 1st Earl Gower
25. Lady Catherine Manners
6. Granville Leveson-Gower, 1st Marquess of Stafford
26. Evelyn Pierrepont, 1st Duke of Kingston-upon-Hull
13. Lady Evelyn Pierrepont
27. Lady Mary Feilding
3. Lady Susanna Leveson-Gower
28. James Stewart, 5th Earl of Galloway
14. Alexander Stewart, 6th Earl of Galloway
29. Lady Catherine Montgomerie
7. Lady Susannah Stewart
30. John Cochrane, 4th Earl of Dundonald
15. Lady Catherine Cochrane
31. Lady Anne Murray

== See also ==
- O'Byrne, William Richard (1849). "Ryder, Granville Dudley" . A Naval Biographical Dictionary . John Murray – via Wikisource.

Parliament of the United Kingdom
Preceded by Hon. Richard Ryder; Viscount Sandon	Member of Parliament for Tiverton; 1830–1832; With: Viscount Sandon 1830–1831; Spencer Perceval 1831–1832	Succeeded by John Heathcoat; James Kennedy
Preceded by Viscount Grimston; Abel Smith; Rowland Alston	Member of Parliament for Hertfordshire; 1841–1847; With: Viscount Grimston 1841–1846; Abel Smith 1841–1847; Thomas Plumer Halsey 1846–1847	Succeeded by Thomas Plumer Halsey; Sir Henry Meux, Bt; Hon. Thomas Brand
