= Sir Henry Meux, 2nd Baronet =

Sir Henry Meux, Bt

Member of Parliament for Hertfordshire
- In office 1847–1859 Serving with Thomas Plumer Halsey, Hon. Thomas Brand, Sir Edward Bulwer-Lytton, Abel Smith, Christopher William Puller
- Preceded by: Thomas Plumer Halsey; Abel Smith; Hon. Granville Ryder
- Succeeded by: Christopher William Puller; Abel Smith; Sir Edward Bulwer-Lytton

Personal details
- Born: Henry Meux; 28 December 1817
- Died: 1 January 1883 (aged 65)
- Spouse: Lady Louisa Caroline Brudenell-Bruce (m. 1856)
- Children: Sir Henry Bruce Meux, 3rd Baronet
- Parent: Sir Henry Meux, 1st Baronet
- Education: Eton College
- Alma mater: Christ Church, Oxford

Sir Henry Meux, 2nd Baronet (pronounced "Mews") (28 December 1817 – 1 January 1883), was head of Meux and Co., a London brewery, and a Member of Parliament (MP).

== Early life ==
He was educated at Eton College and Christ Church, Oxford. On the death of his father on 7 April 1841, he succeeded to the baronetcy and took over the running of Meux's brewery off the Tottenham Court Road (later the Horse Shoe Brewery), which was at the time one of the largest producers of porter in London.

== Career ==
He served as High Sheriff of Hertfordshire in 1845. He was then Conservative MP for Hertfordshire from 1847 to 1859.

By 1855 Meux began showing signs of mental decline and from 1858 he was bedbound with general paresis of the insane, now known to have been caused by tertiary syphilis. He refused to stand down at the March 1857 election and, despite his condition, the Conservatives decided to nominate him rather than risk a contest. He was returned unopposed and the party secured a pair for him for the entire session. On 3 July 1857 he amended his will to leave his entire estate to his wife. His disinherited sisters contested this change and in June 1858 the Commissioners in Lunacy considered whether he had been of sound mind at the time. Evidence of his occasional work and social activity later in 1857 caused the will to be upheld.

After his insanity, his business affairs were handled by trustees. In 1870 they bought an estate at East Overton, Wiltshire (now part of West Overton parish), and they later paid for the rebuilding of the parish church. From 1877 he was the owner of Dauntsey Park House, near Malmesbury in Wiltshire. His son Henry Bruce Meux took over the running of the brewery in 1878.

== Personal life ==
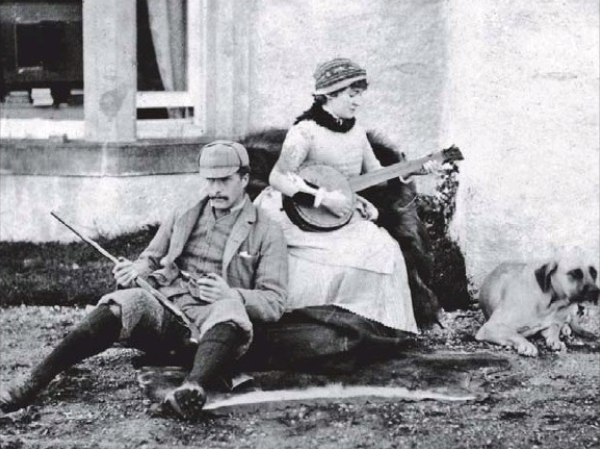
His son, Sir Henry Bruce Meux, 3rd Baronet and his wife Lady Valerie

He married Lady Louisa Caroline Brudenell-Bruce on 19 January 1856, the eldest daughter of Ernest Brudenell-Bruce, 3rd Marquess of Ailesbury and his wife, the former Hon. Louisa Elizabeth Horsley-Beresford (daughter of John Horsley-Beresford, 2nd Baron Decies). Together, they were the parents of:

- Sir Henry Bruce Meux, 3rd Baronet (1856–1900), who married socialite Valerie Langdon in 1878.

Sir Henry died on 1 January 1883. His widow, Lady Louisa, died in December 1894.

Parliament of the United Kingdom
| Preceded by Thomas Plumer Halsey; Abel Smith; Hon. Granville Ryder | Member of Parliament for Hertfordshire; 1847–1859; With: Thomas Plumer Halsey 1847–1854; Hon. Thomas Brand 1847–1852; Sir Edward Bulwer-Lytton 1852–1859; Abel Smith 1854–1857; Christopher William Puller1857–1859 | Succeeded by Christopher William Puller; Abel Smith; Sir Edward Bulwer-Lytton |
Honorary titles
| Preceded by Frederick Cass | High Sheriff of Hertfordshire; 1845 | Succeeded by Felix Calvert |
Baronetage of the United Kingdom
| Preceded by Henry Meux | Baronet (of Theobalds Park); 1831–1883 | Succeeded by Henry Bruce Meux |
