= Walter Lee (English politician) =

Sir Walter Lee (1348 or 1353 – 1395) was an English politician. He sat as MP for Hertfordshire in January 1377, 1379, January 1380, November 1380, 1381, 1385, 1386, February 1388, September 1388, January 1390, November 1390 and Essex in 1391, 1393, and 1394.

He also served as constable and keeper of Colchester Castle from 23 March 1388 until his death in 1395, keeper of Tendring Hundred from 10 February 1393 until his death in 1395 and as Sheriff of Hertfordshire and Essex from 15 November 1389 till 7 November 1390.

He was the son and heir of Sir John Lee and Joan. He was probably the brother of Thomas Lee (MP for Hertfordshire, 1386). By July 1373, he married Margaret and had no children. He was knighted by July 1370.
