= Leventhorpe baronets =

Extinct baronetcy in the Baronetage of England

The Leventhorpe Baronetcy, of Shingey (or Shingle) Hall in the County of Hertford, was a title in the Baronetage of England. It was created on 30 May 1622 for John Leventhorpe. He was the son of Sir Edward Leventhorpe and Mary Parker, daughter of Henry Parker, 11th Baron Morley. The title became extinct on the death of the fifth Baronet in 1680. Shingle Hall was purchased in 1400 by an earlier John Leventhorpe.

== Leventhorpe baronets, of Shingey Hall (1622) ==
- Sir John Leventhorpe, 1st Baronet (c. 1560–1625)
- Sir Thomas Leventhorpe, 2nd Baronet (1592–1636)
- Sir John Leventhorpe, 3rd Baronet (1629–1649)
- Sir Thomas Leventhorpe, 4th Baronet (1635–1679)
- Sir Charles Leventhorpe, 5th Baronet (1594–1680)
