= Abel Smith (1788–1859) =

British politician (1788–1859)

Arms of Smith: Or, a chevron cotised sable between three demi-griffins couped of the last the two in chief respecting each other

Abel Smith (17 July 1788 – 23 February 1859) was a longtime British Member of Parliament.

== Biography ==
He was the eighth child but eldest son of Samuel Smith, also a Member of Parliament, and Elizabeth Frances (née Turnor).

He was nephew of Robert Smith, 1st Baron Carrington. The family had grown wealthy through banking in Nottingham.

Abel Smith entered Parliament in 1810 as member for Malmesbury, and subsequently also represented Wendover and Midhurst, both pocket boroughs controlled by his uncle Lord Carrington, sitting in the Commons for 20 of the last 22 years before the Great Reform Act. He and his father were Wendover's last MPs, as they sat together as its members for the last two years before the borough's abolition.

Three years after the Reform Act, he was elected for Hertfordshire, and served another twelve years as its MP. He was High Sheriff of Hertfordshire in 1849.

Smith married Frances Anne Calvert, the daughter of General Sir Harry Calvert. Their son Abel Smith also became MP for Hertfordshire.

== Notes ==
Parliament of the United Kingdom
| Preceded by Philip Gell; Sir George Bowyer | Member of Parliament for Malmesbury; 1810–1812; With: Philip Gell | Succeeded by William Hicks-Beach; Sir Charles Saxton |
| Preceded by Francis Horner; George Smith | Member of Parliament for Wendover; 1812–1818; With: George Smith | Succeeded by Robert Smith; George Smith |
| Preceded by John Smith; Samuel Smith | Member of Parliament for Midhurst; 1820–1830; With: John Smith | Succeeded by John Abel Smith; George Smith |
| Preceded by Samuel Smith; George Smith | Member of Parliament for Wendover; 1830–1832; With: Samuel Smith | Constituency abolished |
| Preceded by Viscount Grimston; Nicolson Calvert; Sir John Sebright | Member of Parliament for Hertfordshire; 1835–1847; With: Rowland Alston; Viscount Grimston 1835–1846; Granville Ryder 1841–1847; Thomas Plumer Halsey 1846–1847 | Succeeded by Sir Henry Meux; Thomas Brand; Thomas Plumer Halsey |
Honorary titles
| Preceded by William Parker | High Sheriff of Hertfordshire; 1849 | Succeeded by Fulke Greville-Nugent |
