= SS Ercolano =

History

Italy
- Name: Ercolano
- Stricken: 24 April 1854
- Homeport: Port of Naples
- Fate: Sunk 1854

The steamer SS Ercolano was a passenger steamship which plied the waters of the Mediterranean in the 1850s.

The vessel was operated by the Neapolitan Line, operating from Naples to destinations such as Genoa, Marseille and Malta.

== Sinking ==
Approximate location of sinking

On April 24, 1854, the ship left Genoa at 2:00 PM on April 24, 1854, bound for Marseilles with eighty passengers. The steamship sank after a collision with Sicilia in the Gulf of Genoa, somewhere between Nice and Antibes. The passengers included two British politicians: Thomas Plumer Halsey MP, who was drowned along with his wife, youngest son, and two servants; and Sir Robert Peel MP, who survived by swimming ashore. In all, about thirty-six passengers and twelve crew members were lost. Two survivors were later plucked from the wreckage near Nice.

The Sicilia was a newly built steam yacht, on a transfer voyage from the shipyard to Italy when it struck the Ercolano. Its maiden voyage to the United States was cancelled and the vessel was sold to Messageries Impériales. On 9 September 1854, the Sicilia sank in the Tyrrhenian Sea.

The Household Narrative of Current Events of May 1854 reported:

A dreadful Shipwreck has taken place on the coast between Antibes and Nice. The vessel was the Ercolano, a Genoese steamer. On the night of the 24th of April, Mr. Sansom, a passenger, who had been supping with Sir Robert Peel, went upon deck to smoke a cigar; it was a dark night, and the ship rolled heavily: to his great surprise, he saw no man on deck but the man at the helm. Lights appeared in the distance, and he pointed them out to the steersman; who gave no reply. In a few minutes, the ship was struck on the larboard side, by a screw steamer, which proved to be the Sicilia. The masts of the Ercolano gave way; it was evident she would soon sink; all was horror and confusion on board. Mr. Sansom, seeing two sailors lowering a boat, jumped in and was saved. Sir Robert Peel ran to the bow, stripped, plunged into the sea, and swam until he was picked up.

— The Household Narrative of Current Events

A survivor of the sinking stated that the captains of neither vessel were on deck at the time of the collision and that the event was due to their negligence.
