= Edward Benstede =

English politician

Sir Edward Benstede (either 18 October 1353 or 25 January 1355 – 8 October 1432) was an English politician. He sat as MP for Hertfordshire in April 1384, January 1397, September 1397, 1399, and 1402.

He was knighted by March 1382.

== Political career ==
He also served as assessor of a tax in Hertfordshire in May 1379; collector of an aid on the marriage of Princess Blanche in December 1401; collector of a tax in MArch 1404; and collector of a royal loan in January 1420; sheriff of Essex and Hertfordshire from 5 November 1379 till 18 October 1380, 3 November 1398 till 24 November 1400, and 22 November 1405 till 5 November 1406; justice of the peace for Hertfordshire from 14 December 1381 till November 1391, and 16 May 1401 till March 1406.

He also served as commissioner to suppress the rebels of 1381 in Hertfordshire in March and December 1382; commissioner of array in April 1385, March 1392, and March 1419; commissioner of kiddles in June 1398; commissioner to prevent the spread of treasonous rumours in May 1402; commissioner of oyer and terminer in Essex in October 1410 concerning withdrawal of labour services on the Waltham abbey estates, in Hertfordshire in March, and September 1417 concerning withdrawal of labour services on the St. Albans abbey estates; commissioner to arrest Lollards in January 1414; commissioner of inquiry in Derbyshire, Hertfordshire, Lincolnshire, Northumberland, Nottinghamshire, and Yorkshire in February, and May 1414 concerning estates of the Darcy family; and commissioner to raise a royal loan in Hertfordshire in November 1419.

== Family ==
He was the second son and heir of Sir John Benstede (died 1358) by his wife Petronilla (died 1378). He was the great-grandson of the prominent judge Sir John Benstede (died 1323). By February 1384, he was married to Alice and they would have four sons (one predeceased him) and three daughters. By June 1402, he was married to Joan (died 19 August 1449), the daughter of Sir John Thornbury, and the widow of William Greville (died 1401).
