= Thomas Plumer Halsey =

Thomas Plumer Halsey MP (26 January 1815 – 24 April 1854) was a member of parliament for Hertfordshire from 1846 to 1854.

== Early life ==
He was the son of Joseph Thompson Whately (1774–1818), who, on his marriage in 1804 to Sarah Halsey (d. 1864), the only child of Thomas Halsey, MP, assumed that surname by act of parliament. Among his siblings were Emma Halsey (wife of William Tyrwhitt-Drake) and Jane Halsey (wife of George Tyrwhitt-Drake). From his mother's second marriage to the Rev. John Fitz Moore, he had an elder half-sister, Georgiana Theodosia Halsey, who married Col. Leopold Grimston Paget (youngest son of Berkeley Paget, MP, and a grandson of Henry Paget, 1st Earl of Uxbridge).

His paternal grandfather was Rev. Joseph Whately, of Nonsuch Park, Rector of Widford, and Prebendary of Bristol Cathedral.

== Career ==
Halsey was elected member of parliament for Hertfordshire unopposed in January 1846 following the elevation of the previous incumbent, James Grimston to the House of Lords.

Halsey owned and estate called The Hall in Hertfordshire.

== Personal life ==
On 23 January 1839, he married Frederica Johnston, the only child of Gen. Frederick Johnston, at Marylebone. Together, they were the parents of:

- Frederick Halsey (1839–1927), who married Mary Julia Wells in 1865.
- Ethelbert Arthur Sackville Halsey (d. 1854), who died as an infant.

On 24 April 1854, Halsey, his wife and his infant son, Ethelbert, were drowned in the shipwreck of the steamer SS Ercolano in the Gulf of Genoa, along with 13 other English passengers. Fellow passenger Sir Robert Peel survived by swimming. Their older son, Frederick survived as he was a pupil at Eton at the time. He went on to become the first of the Halsey Baronets.

Parliament of the United Kingdom
Preceded by Viscount Grimston; Abel Smith, snr Granville Ryder	Member of Parliament for Hertfordshire; 1846–1854; With: Abel Smith, snr to 1847; Granville Ryder to 1847; Sir Henry Meux, Bt. from 1847; Thomas Trevor, 22nd Baron Dacre 1847–1852; Sir Edward Bulwer-Lytton from 1852	Succeeded by Abel Smith, jnr Sir Henry Meux, Bt. Sir Edward Bulwer-Lytton

== See also ==
- Government of the United Kingdom
- Politics of the United Kingdom
