= Leventhorpe School =

Location
- Cambridge Road; Sawbridgeworth, Hertfordshire, CM21 9BY; England; 51.8207°N 0.1491°E

Information
- Type: Academy
- Motto: "Excellence, Commitment, Respect" "A business and enterprise academy"
- Established: 1965
- Department for Education URN: 137156 Tables
- Ofsted: Reports
- Headteacher: Malcolm White
- Gender: Mixed
- Age: 11 to 19
- Enrolment: 1,202 pupils
- Houses: Rivers, Fawbert, Barnard, Lawrence, Newsom, Cutforth, Wilkins, Moore
- Website: www.leventhorpe.net

Leventhorpe School is a mixed, 11-19 secondary school and sixth form in the town of Sawbridgeworth, Hertfordshire. The school became an academy in August 2011, and is part of the Rivers Multi-Academy Trust.

As of 2025, the school's last inspection was in 2024 when it was judged good.

In 2017, the school's Progress 8 score at GCSE was -0.08, in line with the England average, and the Attainment 8 score was 53 points, above the England and Hertfordshire averages. In 2018, GCSE results "exceed[ed] national targets".

The average grade at A level in 2018 was C, just below the England and Hertfordshire averages of C+. Absence and persistent absence were better than the England average for 2016/17.

== Notable former pupils ==
- Dodie Clark, YouTuber and musician
- Andrew Osagie, athlete
- Jack Porter, footballer
