= Hertfordshire (UK Parliament constituency) =

Parliamentary constituency in the United Kingdom, 1832–1885

- Former county constituency for the House of Commons
- County: Hertfordshire

1290–1885
- Seats: 1290–1832: Two; 1832–1885: Three
- Replaced by: Hertford; St Albans; Hitchin; Watford

Hertfordshire was a county constituency covering the county of Hertfordshire in England. It returned two Knights of the Shire to the House of Commons of England until 1707, then to the House of Commons of Great Britain until 1800, and to the House of Commons of the Parliament of the United Kingdom from 1801 until 1832. The Reform Act 1832 gave the county a third seat with effect from the 1832 general election.

Elections were held using the bloc vote system, when contested. However, even after the 1832 reforms, contested elections were the exception: of the 17 elections from 1832 to 1880, 9 were uncontested, including the 1880 general election. In such cases all the nominated candidates were returned without a vote.

== History ==
The constituency consisted of the historic county of Hertfordshire. (Although Hertfordshire for some of its existence contained two boroughs, Hertford and St Albans, each of which elected two MPs in its own right, these were not excluded from the county constituency, and owning property within the borough could confer a vote at the county election.)

As in other county constituencies the franchise between 1430 and 1832 was defined by the Forty Shilling Freeholder Act, which gave the right to vote to every man who possessed freehold property within the county valued at £2 or more per year for the purposes of land tax; it was not necessary for the freeholder to occupy his land, nor even in later years to be resident in the county at all.

Except during the period of the Commonwealth, Hertfordshire had two MPs elected by the bloc vote method, under which each voter had two votes. In the nominated Barebones Parliament, two members represented Hertfordshire. In the First and Second Parliaments of Oliver Cromwell's Protectorate, however, there was a general redistribution of seats and Hertfordshire elected five members, while each of the boroughs had their representation reduced to a single MP. The traditional arrangements were restored from 1659.

=== General character of the constituency before the Reform Act ===
At the time of the Great Reform Act in 1832, Hertfordshire had a population of approximately 143,000, and was entirely agricultural in character, although there was a limited urban vote: at the election of 1805, when 2628 votes were cast, four towns (St Albans, Bishops Stortford, Ware and Hitchin) provided more than 100 votes each though none provided more than 160.

Elections were held at a single polling place, Hertford, and voters from the rest of the county had to travel to the county town to exercise their franchise; but in a physically small county like Hertfordshire, with good roads, this was less prohibitively expensive than in some others. (It was normal for voters to expect the candidates for whom they voted to meet their expenses in travelling to the poll, making the cost of a contested election substantial in many counties. Even in Hertfordshire, it was reported that accommodation and entertainment for the voters at the county meeting in September 1774 cost the candidates £4,000; and that was merely a meeting to discuss the candidates and see if consensus could be reached without the need for a contest – the cost of the poll the following month, that in the end could not be averted, was on top of this.)

Contested elections were relatively frequent (there were contests at 13 of the 28 general elections between 1701 and 1831), and were often vigorously fought – the voters valued their independence, and at least from the middle of the 18th century no landed interests had much influence over them, although fifty years earlier the local gentry reckoned to return one of the two MPs without opposition.

=== The by-election of 1805 ===
Peter Jupp includes in his collection of documents relating to elections round the turn of the 19th century a contemporary account of the Hertfordshire by-election, written by one of the candidates, William Baker, which gives a vivid picture of electioneering in the county at this period. The election was a straight fight between Baker and Hon. Thomas Brand to fill the vacancy left by the death of Hon. Peniston Lamb; Baker had been the county's MP until three years previously, and was backed by Pitt and his government, while Brand had particular support among the religious dissenters.

Baker's campaign took the form of a personal canvass of the voters, by visiting every town and village of any size in the county, if possible on market day: Hertford on the 26th; Ware on the 28th; then Watton; Stevenage; Hitchin and Baldock on the same day; and so through the whole of Hertfordshire in two weeks, over snow-bound roads with even the high road between St Albans and Berkhamsted barely passable in places. He travelled mostly on horseback, his carriage "attending me as it could at intervals by the great roads, and meeting me at the places where I was to sleep". In most of the county he had already pledges of solid support (he records that at Stevenage he had "nothing to do but go round... and thank the voters for their promises already made in my favour to their Rector"), and where possible in each place he was met by the local magnates who joined him in his canvassing to demonstrate their support.

The informality of the election itself seems strange today. After the candidates had made their final speeches at Hertford, the Sheriff took a show of hands and could have ended the proceedings there and then, had the candidates been content; but, Brand demanding the poll that was his right meant everybody proceeded to the hustings. Voting thus began around one in the afternoon. The poll was continued on the second day, the arrangement being that voting would be from eight o'clock until three, but ended as soon as Brand admitted defeat, some half-an-hour before the agreed deadline. By this time Baker had 1,556 votes and Brand only 1,076, and plainly he felt he had too few supporters unpolled to have any hope of making up the deficit.

The election ended in typically rumbustious fashion. Baker having been declared the victor, his supporters celebrated by chairing their candidate round the town, but

"Wilshere's coachman... had the insolence to drive his master's carriage full speed through the crowd at the time of chairing, to the risk of the lives of hundreds. Providentially, however, no person was materially injured. Brand made an apology to me afterwards by letter for the outrage, and Wilshere, though not at my desire, has since turned the servant away..."
- Letter of William Baker to his son, 22 February 1805, in Hertfordshire County Records Office, quoted by Jupp, op cit

=== After the Reform Act ===
In 1832, the Great Reform Act increased the county's representation from two to three MPs (a change that had not been in the original Reform Bill of 1830 but was adopted the following year), as well as making minor boundary changes. (One parish, Coleshill, was transferred to Buckinghamshire.) The extension of the franchise to tenants-at-will, copyholders and leaseholders increased the electorate a little, but the 4,245 electors registered in 1832 was not much higher than the 4,000 qualified voters who have been estimated for 1754. However, the electorate grew by almost half over the next thirty years, and the extension of the franchise in 1868 increased the electorate still further, to more than 9,000.

=== Abolition ===
The borough of St Albans was disenfranchised for corruption in 1852 and the borough of Hertford was reduced to single-member representation by the 1867 Reform Act. Under the Redistribution of Seats Act 1885, the borough of Hertford ceased to exist, and the county of Hertfordshire was divided into four new single-member constituencies: the Mid or St Albans division of Hertfordshire, the Eastern or Hertford division, the Northern or Hitchin division and the Western or Watford division.

== Members of Parliament ==
=== MPs 1290–1640 ===
Parliament	First member	Second member
1294	Roger Bryan	
1296	Roger Bryan	
1306	Ranulph de Monte Canisto	
1312, 1337, 1349	Sir Phillip de Peletot	
1377 (Jan)	Sir Walter Lee	
1379	Sir Walter Lee	
1380 (Jan)	Sir Walter Lee	
1380 (Nov)	Sir Walter Lee	
1381	Sir Walter Lee	
1384	Sir Edward Benstede	
1385	Sir Walter Lee	
1386	Sir Walter Lee	Thomas Lee
1388 (February)	Sir Walter Lee	Sir Robert Turk
1388 (September)	Sir Walter Lee	Sir Robert Turk
1390 (January)	Sir Walter Lee	Sir John Thornbury
1390 (November)	Sir Walter Lee	John Ruggewyn
1391	John Norbury	Sir John Thornbury
1393	Sir Robert Turk	John Ruggewyn
1394	Richard de la Pantry	John Ruggewyn
1395	Sir Thomas Morewell	John Ruggewyn
1397 (January)	Sir Edward Benstede	John Ruggewyn
1397 (September)	Sir Edward Benstede	John Ruggewyn
1399	Sir Edward Benstede	John Ludwick
1401	Sir Thomas de la Barre	Robert Newport
1402	Sir Edward Benstede	Sir Robert Corbet
1404 (January)	Sir John Poultney	Sir Robert Corbet
1404 (October)	Sir John Poultney	William Parker
1406	Sir John Poultney	John Goldington
1407	William Parker	Sir Thomas de la Barre
1410		
1411	Sir Thomas de la Barre	Robert Newport
1413 (February)		
1413 (May)	John Hotoft	John Leventhorpe
1414 (April)	John Hotoft	William Flete{
1414 (November)	John Hotoft	William Flete
1415		
1416 (March)	John Hotoft	John Leventhorpe
1416 (October)		
1417	Sir Philip Thornbury	John Hotoft
1419	John Fray	John Hotoft
1420	John Fray	John Barley
1421 (May)	Robert Louthe	William Rokesburgh
1421 (December)	Sir Philip Thornbury	John Kirby
1422	John Leventhorpe	John Hotoft
1427	Sir John Tyrell	
1435	Thomas Broket	
1439	Sir John Cressy	
1447	John Troutbeck	
1449	Sir Robert Wingfield	
October 1450	Sir William Oldhall	
March 1453	John Say	Bartholemew Halley
April 1453	John Say	Bartholemew Halley
February 1454	John Say	Bartholemew Halley
1463	Sir John Say	
1467	Sir John Say	
1472	Sir John Say	
January 1478	Sir John Say	John Sturgeon
1491	Sir William Say	
1495	Sir William Say	
1510–1523	No names known	
1529	Henry Barley	Philip Butler
1536		
1539	Sir Henry Parker	Sir Philip Butler
1542	Sir Ralph Sadler	Edward Brocket or John Brocket, snr
1545	Sir Richard Lee	John Cock
1547	Sir Anthony Denny, died and repl. October 1549 by Sir Henry Parker, died and repl. January 1552 by John Cock	Sir Ralph Rowlett
1553 (Mar)	Sir Ralph Sadler	John Cock
1553 (Oct)	Sir John Butler	Sir John Brocket, snr
1554 (Apr)	John Cock	Francis Southwell
1554 (Nov)	John Cock	Edward Brocket
1555	Sir John Brocket, snr	John Cock
1558	John Foster	John Purvey
1559 (Jan)	Sir Thomas Parry	Sir Ralph Sadler
1562–3	Sir Ralph Sadler	Henry Capell
1571	Sir Ralph Sadler	Sir George Carey
1572 (Apr)	Sir Ralph Sadler	Sir John Brocket, jnr
1584 (Nov)	Sir Ralph Sadler	Sir Henry Cocke
1586 (Oct)	Sir Ralph Sadler	Sir Henry Cocke
1588 (Oct)	Robert Cecil	Sir Philip Butler
1593	Sir Robert Cecil	Sir Henry Cocke
1597 (Sep)	Sir Robert Cecil	Rowland Lytton
1601 (Oct)	Sir Robert Cecil	Sir Henry Cary
1604	Sir Henry Cary	Rowland Lytton
1614	Sir Henry Carey	Ralph Coningsby
1621	Sir Henry Cary	Sir Charles Morrison, 1st Baronet
1624	Sir Charles Morrison, 1st Baronet	Sir William Lytton
1625	John Boteler	Sir John Boteler
1626	John Boteler	Sir Thomas Dacres
1628	Sir William Lytton	Sir Thomas Dacres
1629–1640	No Parliament summoned	

=== MPs 1640–1653 ===
Year	First member	First party	Second member	Second party
April 1640	Arthur Capel	Royalist	Sir William Lytton	
November 1640	Arthur Capel	Royalist	Sir William Lytton	Parliamentarian
August 1641	Sir Thomas Dacres	Parliamentarian	Sir William Lytton	Parliamentarian
December 1648	Dacres and Lytton excluded in Pride's Purge – both seats vacant			
1653	Henry Lawrence		William Reeve	

=== MPs 1654–1658 ===
First Protectorate Parliament: representation increased to 5 members
Year	First member	Second member	Third member	Fourth member	Fifth member
1654	Henry Lawrence	Sir Richard Lucy, Bt	John Wittewrong	The Earl of Salisbury	Thomas Nicholl
1656	Sir John Gore	Sir Richard Lucy, Bt	John Wittewrong	The Earl of Salisbury	Rowland Lytton

=== MPs 1659–1832 ===
Third Protectorate Parliament: representation reverted to 2 members
Year	First member	First party	Second member	Second party
January 1659	Richard Galston		Rowland Lytton	
May 1659	Not represented in the restored Rump			
April 1660	Henry Caesar		Rowland Lytton	
1661	Sir Richard Franklin		Sir Thomas Fanshawe	
1666	Sir Richard Franklin		Sir Henry Caesar	
1668	Sir Richard Franklin		Viscount Cranborne	
1669	Sir Richard Franklin		William Hale	
February 1679	Silius Titus		William Hale	
August 1679	Sir Jonathan Keate		Sir Charles Caesar	
1681	William Hale		Sir Charles Caesar	
1685	Ralph Freman		Thomas Halsey	
1689	Sir Thomas Blount		Sir Charles Caesar	
1690	Sir Thomas Blount		Ralph Freman	
1695	Sir Thomas Blount		Thomas Halsey	
1697	Ralph Freman, junior		Thomas Halsey	
1705	Ralph Freman, junior		Sir John Spencer, Bt	
1708	Ralph Freman, junior		Thomas Halsey	
1715	Ralph Freman, junior		Sir Thomas Sebright, Bt	
1727	Charles Caesar	Tory	Sir Thomas Sebright, Bt	
1734	William Plumer	Whig	Sir Thomas Sebright, Bt	
1736	William Plumer	Whig	Charles Caesar	Tory
1741	Jacob Houblon	Tory	Charles Gore	Tory
1747	Paggen Hale		Charles Gore	Tory
1755	William Plumer	Whig	Charles Gore	Tory
1761	Thomas Plumer Byde		Jacob Houblon	Tory
1768	William Plumer		Thomas Halsey	
1784	William Plumer		The Viscount Grimston	
1790	William Plumer	Whig	William Baker	Whig
1802	William Plumer	Whig	Hon. Peniston Lamb	Whig
1805	William Plumer	Whig	William Baker	Tory
1807	Hon. Thomas Brand	Whig	Sir John Sebright, Bt	Whig
1819	Hon. William Lamb	Whig	Sir John Sebright, Bt	Whig
1826	Nicolson Calvert	Whig	Sir John Sebright, Bt	Whig
1832	Representation increased to three members			

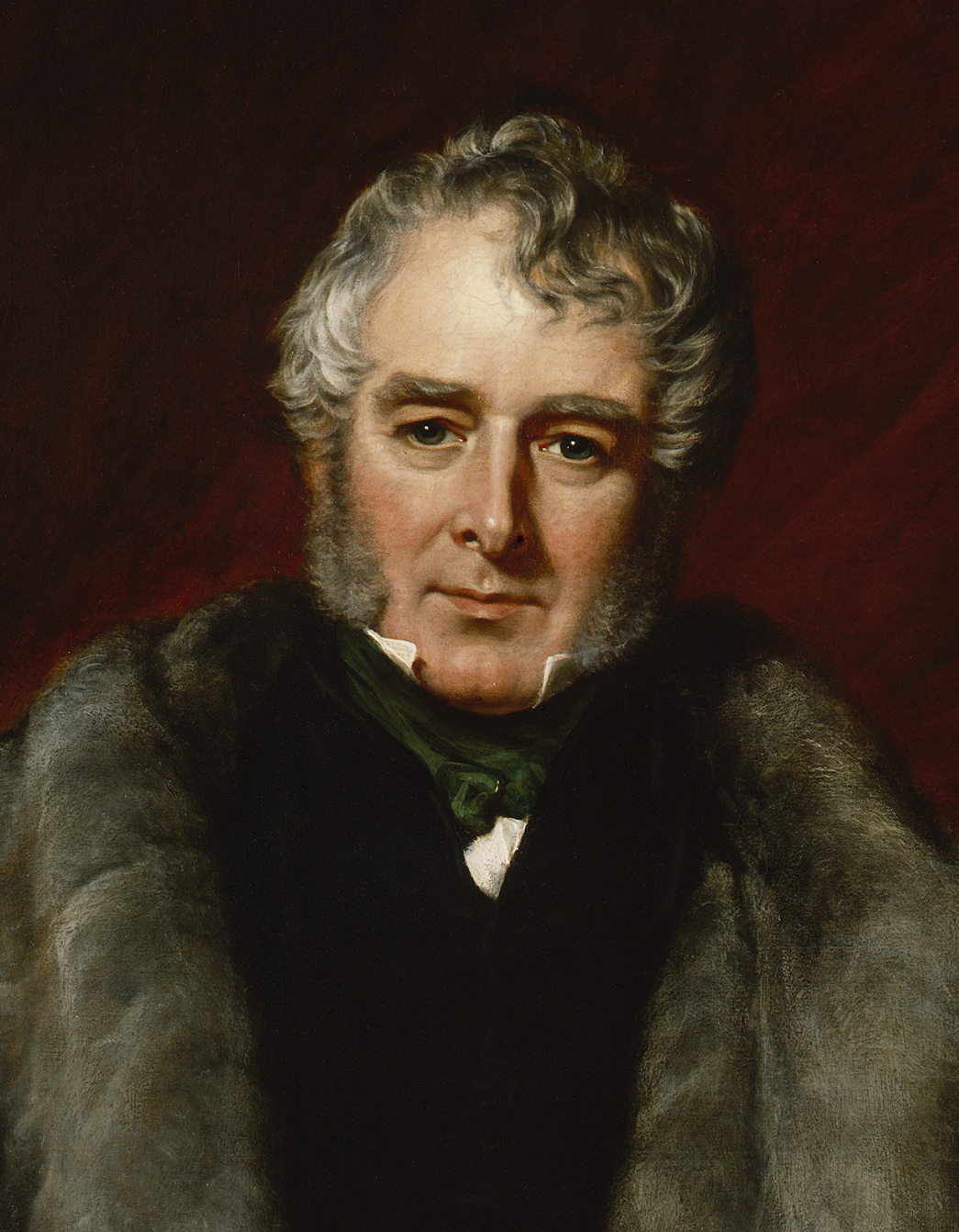
William Lamb, MP for Hertfordshire 1819–1826 and Prime Minister of the UK 1835–1841 as Viscount Melbourne, leading from the House of Lords

=== MPs 1832–1885 ===
Election	First member	First party	Second member	Second party	Third member	Third party
1832	Sir John Sebright, Bt	Whig	Nicolson Calvert	Whig	Viscount Grimston	Tory
1834	Sir John Sebright, Bt	Whig	Nicolson Calvert	Whig	Viscount Grimston	Conservative
1835	Abel Smith, senior	Conservative	Rowland Alston	Whig	Viscount Grimston	Conservative
1841	Abel Smith, senior	Conservative	Hon. Granville Ryder	Conservative	Viscount Grimston	Conservative
1846 by-election	Abel Smith, senior	Conservative	Hon. Granville Ryder	Conservative	Thomas Plumer Halsey	Conservative
1847	Sir Henry Meux, Bt	Conservative	Thomas Brand	Whig	Thomas Plumer Halsey	Conservative
1852	Sir Henry Meux, Bt	Conservative	Sir Edward Bulwer-Lytton, Bt	Conservative	Thomas Plumer Halsey	Conservative
1854 by-election	Sir Henry Meux, Bt	Conservative	Sir Edward Bulwer-Lytton, Bt	Conservative	Abel Smith, junior	Conservative
1857	Sir Henry Meux, Bt	Conservative	Sir Edward Bulwer-Lytton, Bt	Conservative	Christopher William Puller	Whig
1859	Abel Smith, junior	Conservative	Sir Edward Bulwer-Lytton, Bt	Conservative	Christopher William Puller	Liberal
1864 by-election	Abel Smith, junior	Conservative	Sir Edward Bulwer-Lytton, Bt	Conservative	Henry Surtees	Conservative
1865	Hon. Henry Cowper	Liberal	Sir Edward Bulwer-Lytton, Bt	Conservative	Henry Surtees	Conservative
1866 by-election	Hon. Henry Cowper	Liberal	Abel Smith, junior	Conservative	Henry Surtees	Conservative
1868	Hon. Henry Cowper	Liberal	Abel Smith, junior	Conservative	Henry Brand	Liberal
1874	Hon. Henry Cowper	Liberal	Abel Smith, junior	Conservative	Frederick Halsey	Conservative
1885	Constituency abolished					

== Election results ==
=== Elections in the 1830s ===
General election 1830: Hertfordshire (2 seats)
Party	Candidate	Votes	%
Whig	John Sebright	Unopposed	
Whig	Nicolson Calvert	Unopposed	
Registered electors		c. 4,000	
Whig hold			
Whig hold			

General election 1831: Hertfordshire (2 seats)
Party	Candidate	Votes	%
Whig	John Sebright	Unopposed	
Whig	Nicolson Calvert	Unopposed	
Registered electors		c. 4,000	
Whig hold			
Whig hold			

General election 1832: Hertfordshire (3 seats)
Party	Candidate	Votes	%
Whig	John Sebright	2,154	25.7
Whig	Nicolson Calvert	2,141	25.6
Tory	James Grimston	2,074	24.8
Whig	Rowland Alston	2,007	24.0
Turnout		3,845	90.6
Registered electors		4,245	
Majority		67	0.8
Whig hold			
Whig hold			
Majority		67	0.8
Tory win (new seat)			

General election 1835: Hertfordshire (3 seats)
Party	Candidate	Votes	%
Whig	Rowland Alston	Unopposed	
Conservative	James Grimston	Unopposed	
Conservative	Abel Smith, Sr.	Unopposed	
Registered electors		4,520	
Whig hold			
Conservative hold			
Conservative gain from Whig			

General election 1837: Hertfordshire (3 seats)
Party	Candidate	Votes	%
Whig	Rowland Alston	Unopposed	
Conservative	James Grimston	Unopposed	
Conservative	Abel Smith, Sr.	Unopposed	
Registered electors		5,137	
Whig hold			
Conservative hold			
Conservative hold			

=== Elections in the 1840s ===
General election 1841: Hertfordshire (3 seats)
Party	Candidate	Votes	%	±%
Conservative	James Grimston	2,585	27.5	N/A
Conservative	Granville Ryder	2,552	27.2	N/A
Conservative	Abel Smith, Sr.	2,525	26.9	N/A
Whig	Rowland Alston	1,732	18.4	N/A
Majority		793	8.5	N/A
Turnout		3,845	71.1	N/A
Registered electors		5,409		
Conservative hold		Swing	N/A	
Conservative hold		Swing	N/A	
Conservative gain from Whig		Swing	N/A	

Grimston succeeded to the peerage, becoming 2nd Earl of Verulam and causing a by-election.

By-election, 8 January 1846: Hertfordshire
Party	Candidate	Votes	%	±%
Conservative	Thomas Plumer Halsey	Unopposed		
Conservative hold				

General election 1847: Hertfordshire (3 seats)
Party	Candidate	Votes	%	±%
Conservative	Thomas Plumer Halsey	Unopposed		
Conservative	Henry Meux	Unopposed		
Whig	Thomas Brand	Unopposed		
Registered electors		5,591		
Conservative hold				
Conservative hold				
Whig gain from Conservative				

=== Elections in the 1850s ===
General election 1852: Hertfordshire (3 seats)
Party	Candidate	Votes	%	±%
Conservative	Thomas Plumer Halsey	2,225	17.9	N/A
Conservative	Henry Meux	2,219	17.8	N/A
Conservative	Edward Bulwer-Lytton	2,190	17.6	N/A
Whig	Thomas Trevor	2,043	16.4	N/A
Whig	Christopher William Puller	1,890	15.2	N/A
Whig	George Jacob Bosanquet	1,868	15.0	N/A
Majority		147	1.2	N/A
Turnout		4,145 (est)	71.7 (est)	N/A
Registered electors		5,779		
Conservative hold		Swing	N/A	
Conservative hold		Swing	N/A	
Conservative gain from Whig		Swing	N/A	

Halsey's death caused a by-election.

By-election, 24 May 1854: Hertfordshire
Party	Candidate	Votes	%	±%
Conservative	Abel Smith jnr.	2,205	50.6	−2.7
Whig	Christopher William Puller	2,151	49.4	+2.8
Majority		54	1.2	0.0
Turnout		4,356	75.7	+4.0
Registered electors		5,752		
Conservative hold		Swing	−2.8	

General election 1857: Hertfordshire (3 seats)
Party	Candidate	Votes	%	±%
Conservative	Henry Meux	Unopposed		
Conservative	Edward Bulwer-Lytton	Unopposed		
Whig	Christopher William Puller	Unopposed		
Registered electors		6,061		
Conservative hold				
Conservative hold				
Whig gain from Conservative				

Bulwer-Lytton was appointed Secretary of State for the Colonies, requiring a by-election.

By-election, 8 June 1858: Hertfordshire
Party	Candidate	Votes	%	±%
Conservative	Edward Bulwer-Lytton	Unopposed		
Conservative hold				

General election 1859: Hertfordshire (3 seats)
Party	Candidate	Votes	%	±%
Conservative	Abel Smith jnr.	Unopposed		
Conservative	Edward Bulwer-Lytton	Unopposed		
Liberal	Christopher William Giles-Puller	Unopposed		
Registered electors		6,190		
Conservative hold				
Conservative hold				
Liberal hold				

=== Elections in the 1860s ===
Puller's death caused a by-election.

By-election, 14 March 1864: Hertfordshire (1 seat)
Party	Candidate	Votes	%	±%
Conservative	Henry Surtees	2,274	52.9	N/A
Liberal	Henry Cowper	2,026	47.1	N/A
Majority		248	5.8	N/A
Turnout		4,300	74.9	N/A
Registered electors		5,742		
Conservative gain from Liberal		Swing	N/A	

General election 1865: Hertfordshire (3 seats)
Party	Candidate	Votes	%	±%
Liberal	Henry Cowper	2,537	25.5	N/A
Conservative	Edward Bulwer-Lytton	2,485	25.0	N/A
Conservative	Henry Surtees	2,478	24.9	N/A
Conservative	Abel Smith	2,447	24.6	N/A
Majority		52	0.5	N/A
Turnout		5,007 (est)	80.4 (est)	N/A
Registered electors		6,228		
Liberal hold		Swing	N/A	
Conservative hold		Swing	N/A	
Conservative hold		Swing	N/A	

Bulwer-Lytton was elevated to the peerage, becoming Lord Lytton and causing a by-election.

By-election, 23 July 1866: Hertfordshire (1 seat)
Party	Candidate	Votes	%	±%
Conservative	Abel Smith	Unopposed		
Conservative hold				

General election 1868: Hertfordshire (3 seats)
Party	Candidate	Votes	%	±%
Liberal	Henry Cowper	3,693	26.2	+13.4
Liberal	Henry Brand	3,625	25.8	+13.0
Conservative	Abel Smith	3,396	24.1	−0.5
Conservative	Henry Surtees	3,356	23.9	−1.0
Majority		269	1.9	N/A
Turnout		7,035 (est)	74.7 (est)	−5.7
Registered electors		9,423		
Liberal hold		Swing	+3.6	
Liberal gain from Conservative		Swing	+3.5	
Conservative hold		Swing	−6.9	

=== Elections in the 1870s ===
General election 1874: Hertfordshire (3 seats)
Party	Candidate	Votes	%	±%
Conservative	Frederick Halsey	4,499	30.1	+6.2
Conservative	Abel Smith	4,498	30.1	+6.0
Liberal	Henry Cowper	2,974	19.9	−6.3
Liberal	Henry Brand	2,964	19.8	−6.0
Majority		1,534	10.3	N/A
Turnout		7,468 (est)	76.1 (est)	+1.4
Registered electors		9,809		
Conservative hold		Swing	+3.1	
Conservative gain from Liberal		Swing	+3.0	
Liberal hold		Swing	−6.2	

=== Elections in the 1880s ===
General election 1880: Hertfordshire (3 seats)
Party	Candidate	Votes	%	±%
Liberal	Henry Cowper	Unopposed		
Conservative	Frederick Halsey	Unopposed		
Conservative	Abel Smith	Unopposed		
Registered electors		10,050		
Liberal hold				
Conservative hold				
Conservative hold				
