= Bengeo =

Suburb of Hertford, England

Coordinates: 51.804°N 0.079°W

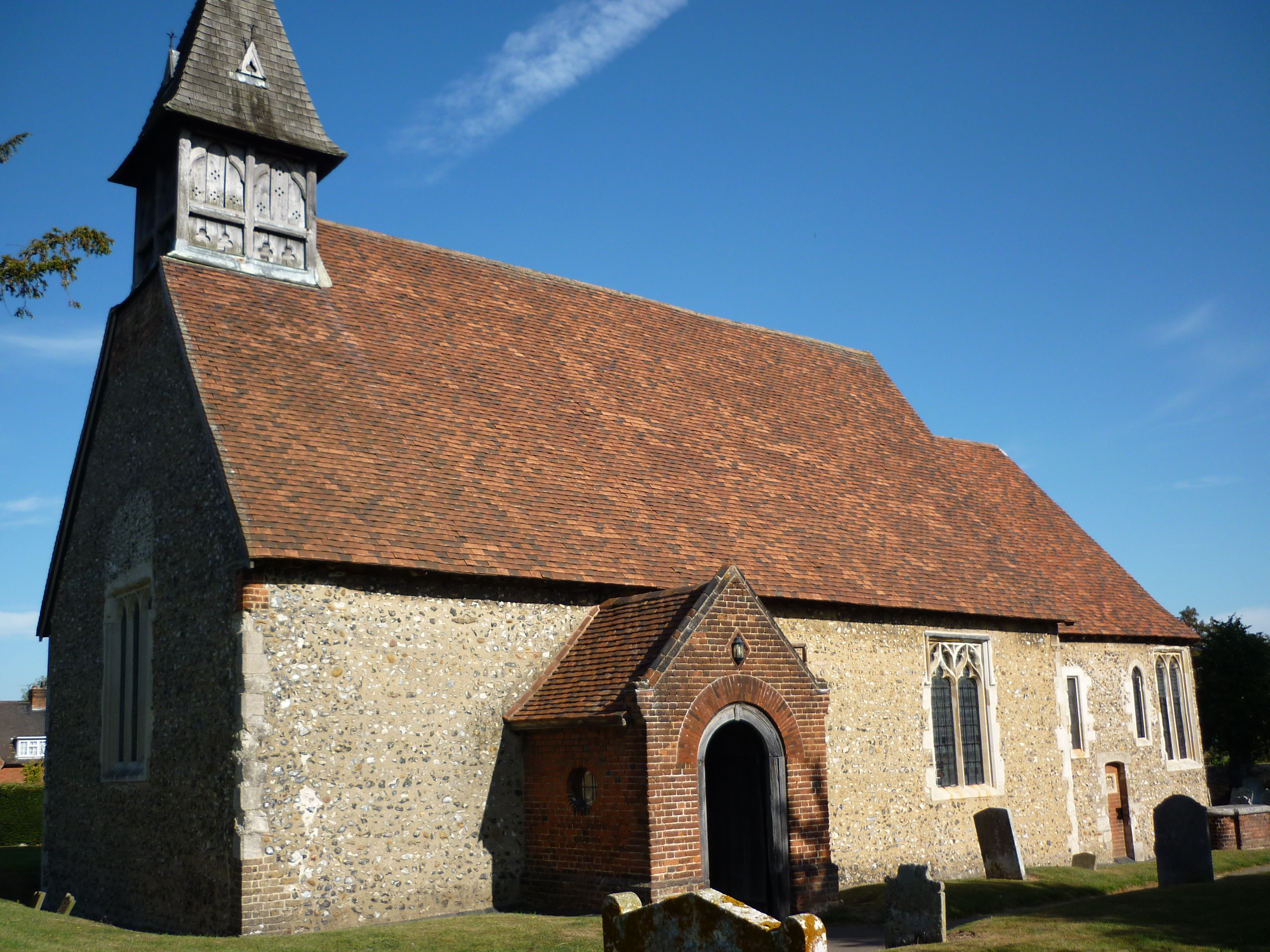
- St Leonard's Church, Bengeo

- Location within Hertfordshire
- OS grid reference: TL3213
- Civil parish: Hertford
- District: East Hertfordshire
- Shire county: Hertfordshire
- Region: East
- Country: England
- Sovereign state: United Kingdom
- Post town: Hertford
- Postcode district: SG14
- Dialling code: 01992
- Police: Hertfordshire
- Fire: Hertfordshire
- Ambulance: East of England
- UK Parliament: Hertford and Stortford

Bengeo /ˈbɛn.dʒoʊ/ is a suburb of Hertford, in the East Hertfordshire district of Hertfordshire, England. Bengeo lies on the north bank of the River Beane, which separates it from the rest of Hertford.

Bengeo was historically a separate village and parish. As well as the village itself, the parish also included rural areas to the north, including the hamlets of Tonwell and Chapmore End. In 1892, the borough boundaries of Hertford were extended across the Beane to include the southern part of Bengeo parish, including the village, which area was becoming increasingly urbanised. In 1894, the civil parish of Bengeo was split, with the part outside the borough becoming a separate parish called Bengeo Rural.

Bengeo itself now forms part of the civil parish of Hertford and is also classed as part of the Hertford built up area. It gives its name to the Hertford Bengeo ward, which also includes areas south of the Beane.

== Toponymy ==
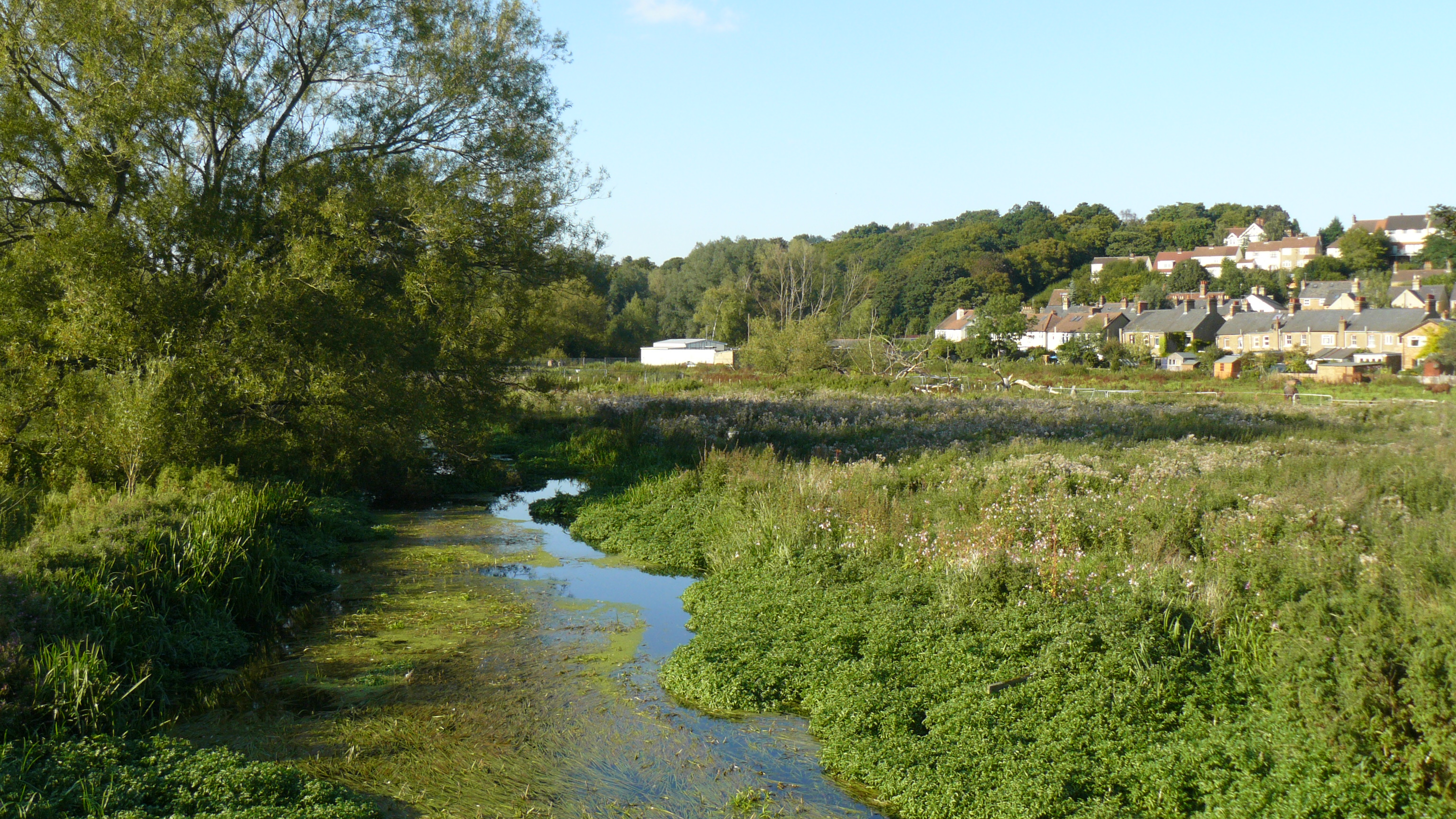
River Beane towards Molewood Taken from Beane Road

Bengeo is on a rise between the River Beane and River Rib overlooking Hartham Common. Its toponym is derived from an Old English name meaning spur or ridge over the River Beane. The Domesday Book of 1086 records it as Belingehou. It evolved through forms including Beneggho and Beningho in the 13th century, Bengeho in the 15th century and Benjow in the 16th century before reaching its current form.

== History ==
Bengeo was an ancient parish in the Hertford Hundred of Hertfordshire.

In the Domesday Book of 1086 there were nine estates or manors listed at the vill of Belingehou, which between them included 96 households. A priest is mentioned in the Domesday Book, suggesting Bengeo was a parish by that time. Its historic parish church, dedicated to St Leonard, dates from the early 12th century.

In 1892, the borough boundaries of Hertford were extended in several directions. To the north of the town, the area added to the borough included the southern part of Bengeo parish, including the old village around St Leonard's Church and the more suburban areas which had been growing up around Port Hill, Molewood Road and Bengeo Street.

Two years later, the Local Government Act 1894 directed that civil parishes could no longer straddle borough boundaries, and so the civil parish of Bengeo was split into a Bengeo Rural parish covering the areas outside the borough boundary, and a Bengeo Urban parish covering the areas within the borough. Bengeo Urban was short-lived as a parish; in 1900 all the parishes within the borough of Hertford were united into a Hertford parish matching the borough. At the 1891 census (the last before its abolition), the civil parish of Bengeo had a population of 2,586.

== Geography and amenities ==
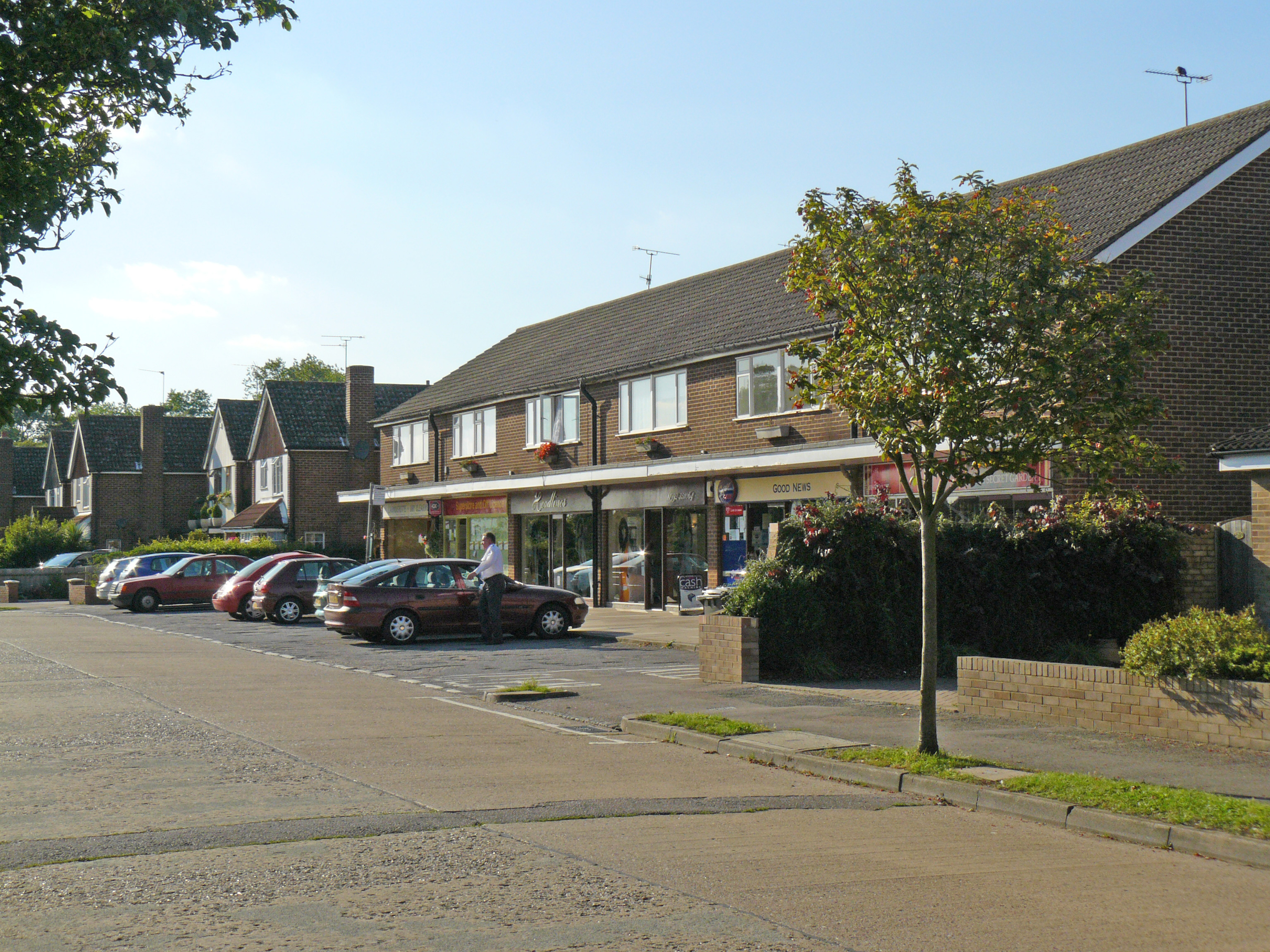
The Avenue

Bengeo is classed as part of the Hertford built up area by the Office for National Statistics. Apart from on its south side where it adjoins the rest of Hertford, in other directions Bengeo is mostly surrounded by countryside. Informally (the terms having no official status) Bengeo consists of Upper and Lower Bengeo; Upper Bengeo is the area at the top of Port Hill leading out of Hertford town centre, while Lower Bengeo is the area on the side of the hill and centred on Byde Street. On an approximate north–south trajectory Bengeo is bisected by the B158, known as Port Hill as it leaves Hertford and climbs the hill to Upper Bengeo and then as Bengeo Street as it continues through, and then out of, Bengeo to the north. Leaving Port Hill to the east runs The Warren, an ancient footpath along the edge of the River Beane and Hartham Common leading to the ancient church of St Leonard.

Bengeo has various amenities including a post office, local shops, several public houses, two veterinary practices, a number of sports teams, two churches and a Plymouth Brethren Meeting Room. There are two State primary schools, Mill Mead Primary School in Port Vale in Lower Bengeo close to Hertford and, at the opposite end of Bengeo on the north end of The Avenue, Bengeo Primary School; on the east side is Duncombe School, an independent preparatory school.

== Notable buildings ==
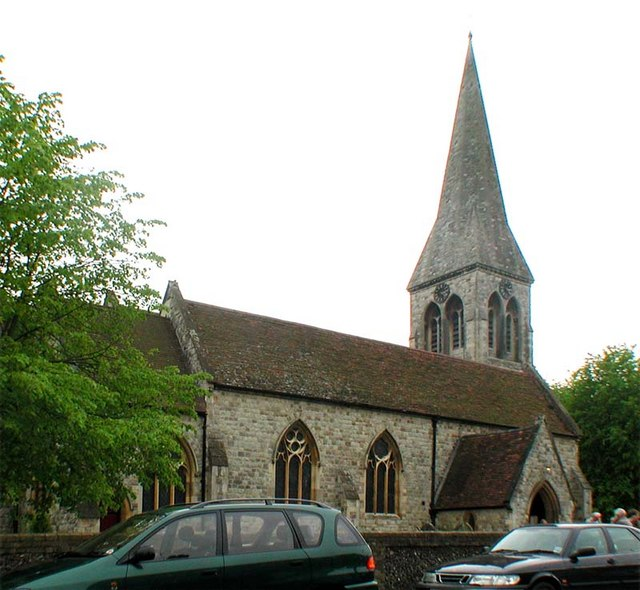
Holy Trinity parish church, New Road

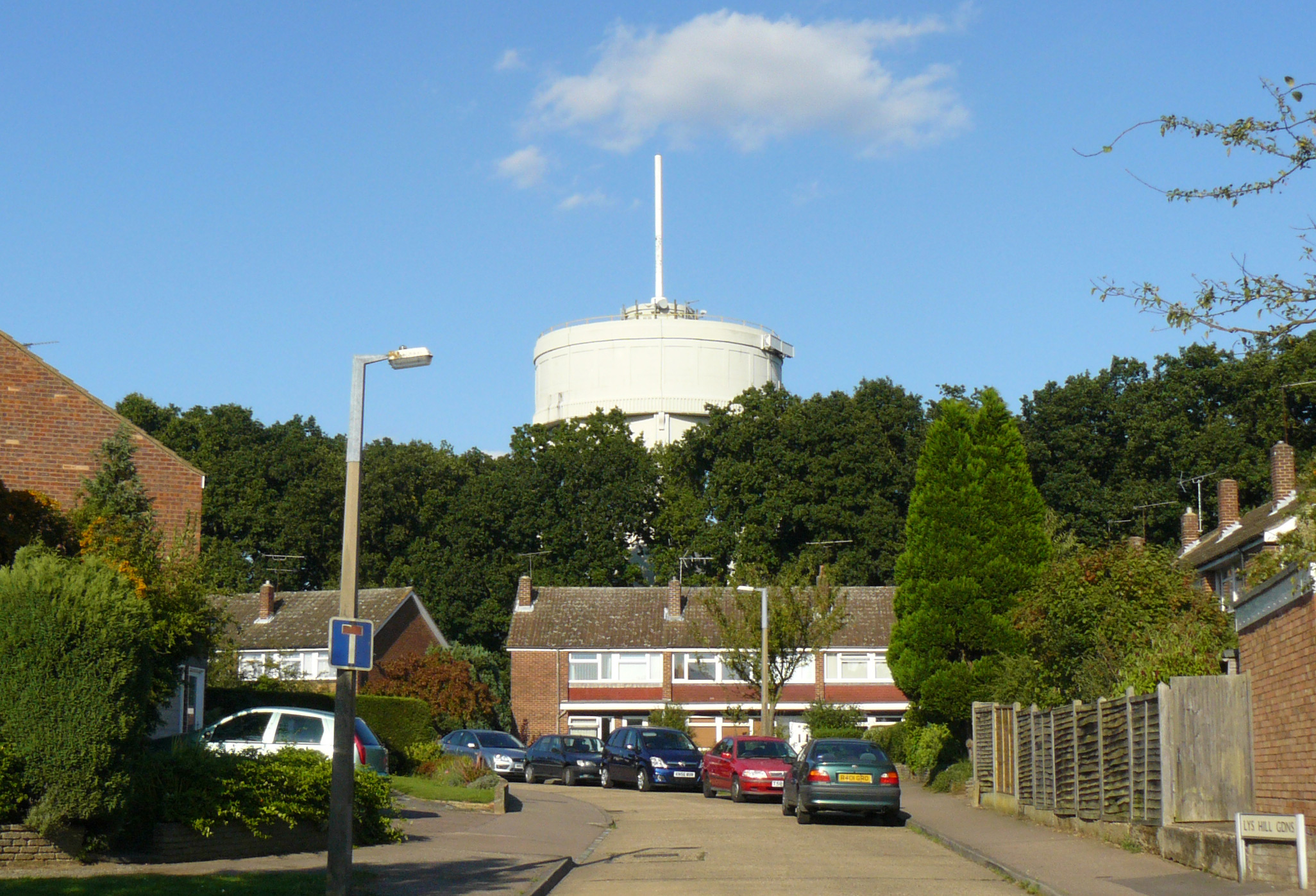
Bengeo Watertower

The former parish church of St Leonard, Bengeo, is a 12th-century Norman building and the oldest building in Hertford. It was the parish church of Bengeo until 1855, when it was succeeded by the new Holy Trinity parish church designed by Benjamin Ferrey. St. Leonard's is still used for regular Sunday services in summer months, as well as hosting exhibitions and concerts.

Close to St Leonard's Church along St Leonard's Road are three of Hertford's oldest houses, Revels Hall, built in the mid sixteenth century, Bengeo Old House, formerly the vicarage, built in the late sixteenth century and Bengeo Hall, built in the late seventeenth century and home to landscape painter Joshua Gosselin. All are Grade II* listed buildings.

On the west side of Bengeo are two further Grade II listed buildings, The Old Pest House and Little Molewood. The former, on the corner of Byde Street and Fanshawe Street, was built in 1763 as a smallpox isolation hospital; the latter, situated on The Avenue, is an arts and crafts style house, built in 1904 for the Graveson family of Hertford by the architects Barry Parker and Raymond Unwin, who were the architects and planners of Letchworth Garden City.

The prominent concrete water tower on The Drive was built in 1929 and opened in 1930 to boost the water supply to new housing which could no longer be adequately accommodated by the then (but no longer) existing pumping station and water tower on Tower Street. The Drive was developed after the construction of the tower. Today it has an array of aerials on the top, providing inter alia a local television relay from Crystal Palace transmitting station.

== Notable people ==
- Captain W. E. Johns, author of many books including the Biggles series of novels, was born in February 1893 in Molewood Road, Bengeo.
- Sir Thomas Dimsdale (1712–1800), pioneer of smallpox inoculation who inoculated Catherine the Great of Russia. He lived at Port Hill House and established an inoculation house still known as "The Pest House" on the corner of Byde Street and Fanshawe Street. He was also MP for Hertford from 1780 to 1789.
- Thomas Charles Byde Rooke (1806–1858) was an English physician who married into the royal family of the Kingdom of Hawaii was born in Bengeo. He built a mansion called the Rooke House in Honolulu that became popular with political and social leaders of the Kingdom.
- Les Howe (1912–1999), professional footballer with 165 appearances for Tottenham Hotspur, was born in Bengeo.
- Sir John Rennie (1794–1874) architect and civil engineer responsible for completing London Bridge and the Plymouth Breakwater died in Bengeo.
- Sir Roy Malcolm Anderson FRS (born 12 April 1947) is a leading British expert on epidemiology and was educated at Duncombe School in Bengeo. He has mathematically modelled the spread of diseases such as new variant Creutzfeldt–Jakob disease and AIDS.
- Lieutenant-General Arthur Ernest Percival CB DSO* OBE MC OStJ DL (26 December 1887 – 31 January 1966) was a British Army officer and World War I veteran and attended school in Bengeo. He built a successful military career during the interwar period but is most noted for his involvement in World War II, when he commanded the forces of the British Commonwealth during the Battle of Malaya and the subsequent Battle of Singapore.
- John George Howard, (1803–1890) born John Corby in Bengeo, and was an official surveyor and civil engineer for the City of Toronto government in Toronto, Ontario, Canada. He was also the first professional architect in Toronto where he was responsible for the design of numerous public, commercial and residential buildings. He was the principal donor of High Park to the people of Toronto.
- Edmund Feilde (1620–1676) politician and barrister owned land in Bengeo.
- Walter Lee (c. 1350 – 1395) politician and High Sheriff of Hertfordshire and Essex owned land in Bengeo.
- Noel Pemberton Billing (1881–1948) aviator, inventor, publisher, extreme right-wing politician and MP for East Hertfordshire lived on Farquhar Street in 'Hertford House' and built a number of bungalows in the grounds, which incorporated some of his inventions. The aviation company he founded (Supermarine) went on to develop, amongst other aircraft, the Spitfire.
- George Ezra (1993–present), singer and songwriter, lived in Bengeo and attended Bengeo Primary School.
- James Judd (1949–present), classical music conductor, spent his childhood and youth in Bengeo, living in The Drive. He was music director of the Florida Philharmonic Orchestra, from 1987 to 2001, and music director of the New Zealand Symphony Orchestra (NZSO), from 1999 to 2007. Presently (2017) he is music director of the Israel Symphony Orchestra Rishon LeZion, artistic director and principal conductor of the Daejeon Philharmonic Orchestra in South Korea, and music director-designate of the Slovak Philharmonic Orchestra.
- John Tate (1448–1507) the first paper maker in England founded the first English paper mill on the edge of Bengeo at Sele Mill on the River Beane. Nearby The Sele School features a scroll of paper on their school crest acknowledging the link to Tate.
- Oliver Skipp (2000–present), professional footballer with Tottenham Hotspur, started out his footballing career with Bengeo Tigers and attended independent Duncombe School in Bengeo.
- Christian Scales (1996–present) English journeyman professional footballer, started his soccer career at Bengeo Tigers.
- Ivor Grattan-Guinness (1941 - 2014) Mathematician and Kenneth O. May Prize winner, lived in Bengeo.
