= Dale Lodge Hotel =

Hotel in Grasmere, South Lakeland, Cumbria, England

Coordinates: 54°27′28.6″N 3°1′31.6″W

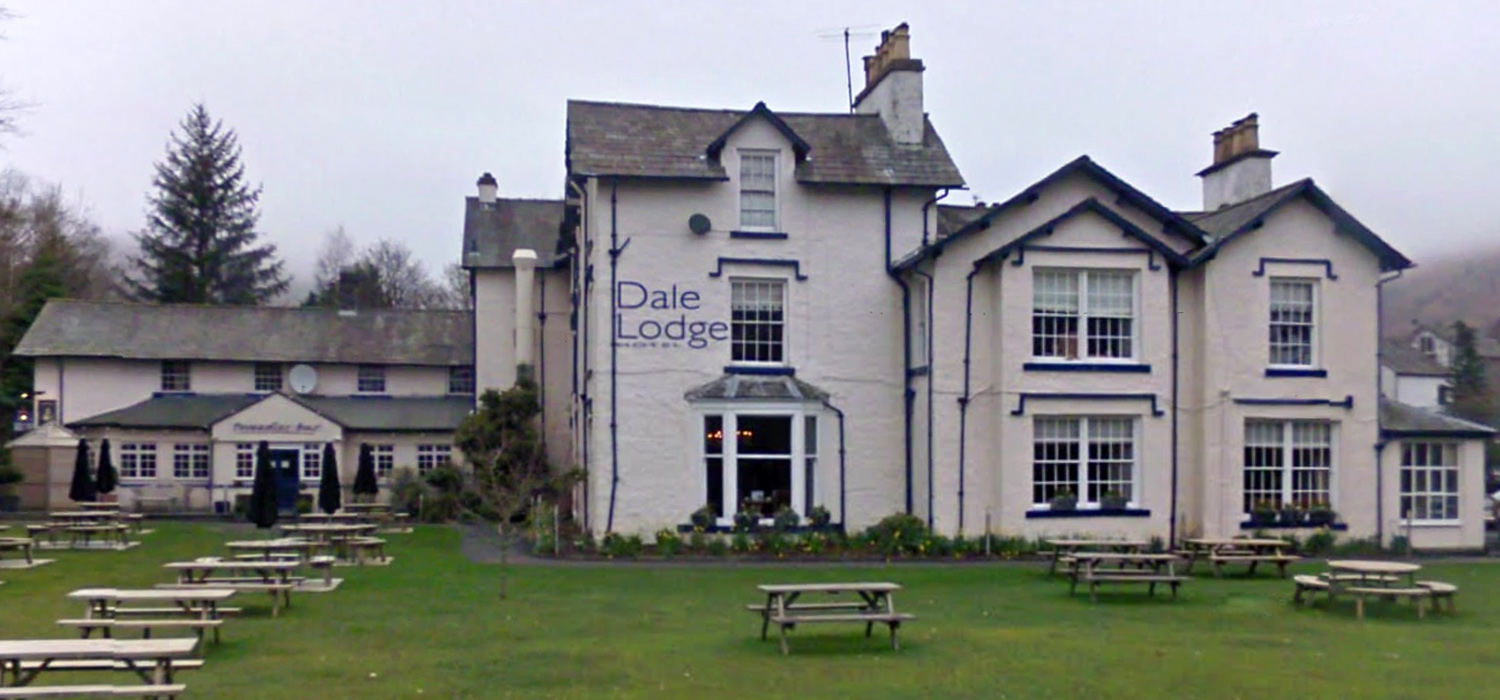
Dale Lodge Hotel

Dale Lodge is a historic hotel in the village of Grasmere, in the English county of Cumbria. It was built in the early 1800s, and was a private residence until about 1900. It was used mainly by the Townsend-Farquhar family, particularly by the two dowager ladies, Lady Maria Farquhar, followed by her daughter in law, Lady Erica Farquhar. When the second Lady Farquhar died, the property was sold and it became a hotel.

== Lady Maria Farquhar ==
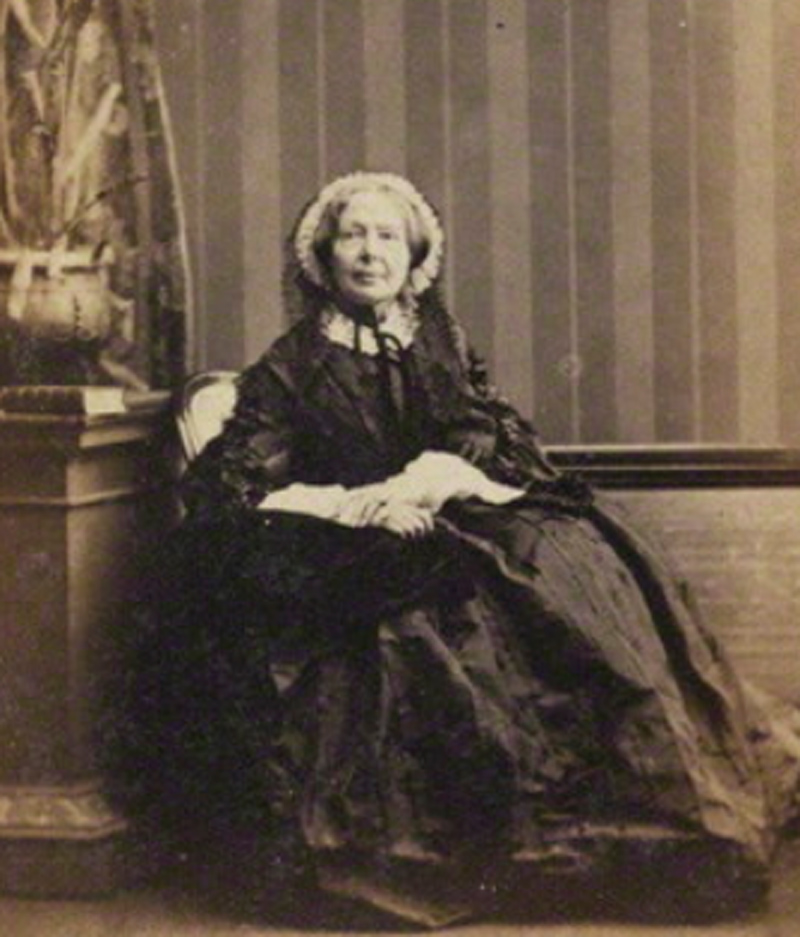
Lady Maria Farquhar

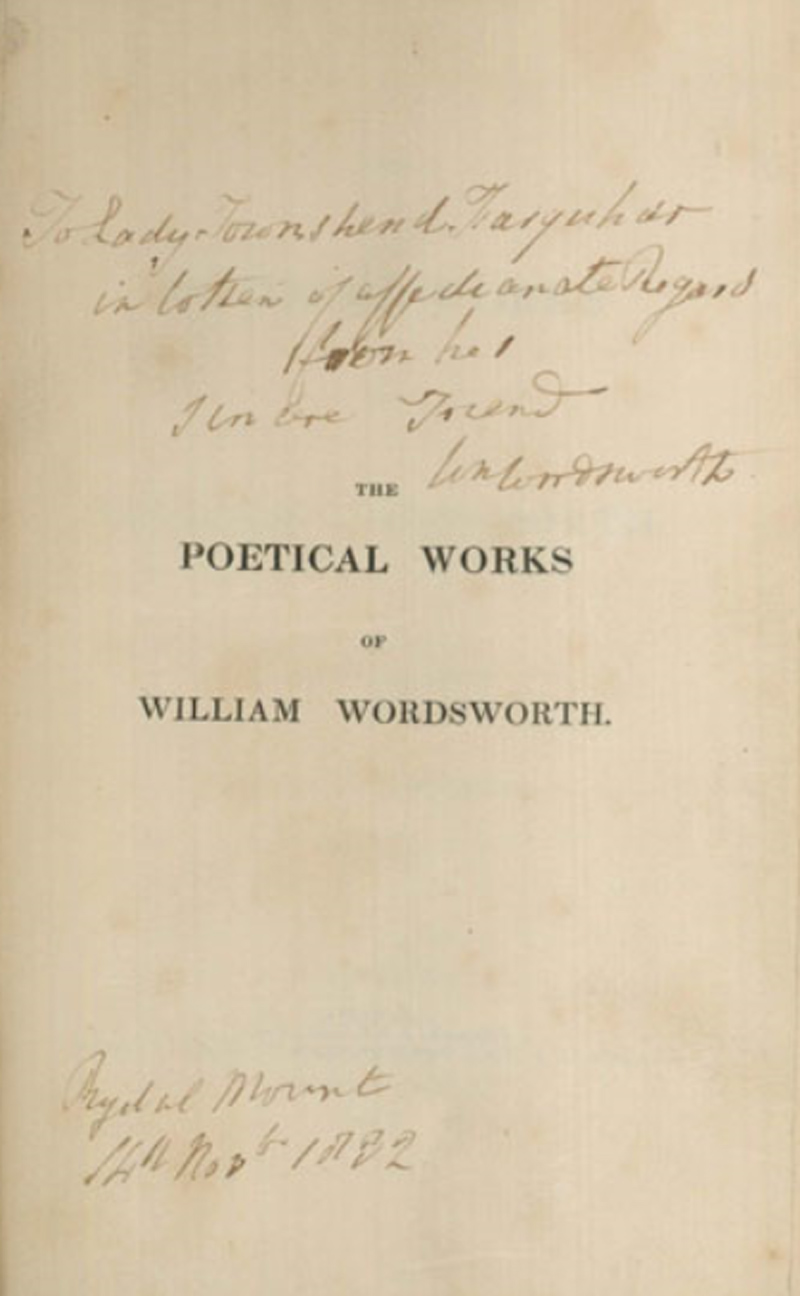
Inscription on the title page by William Wordsworth to Lady Maria Farquhar

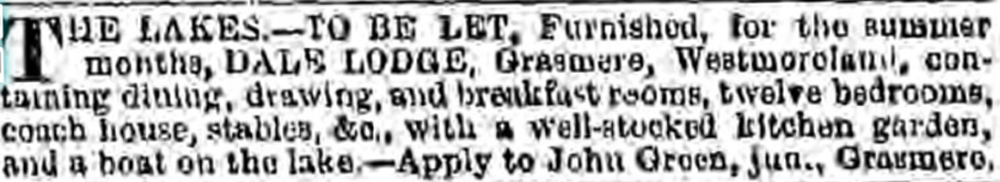
Rental advertisement of Dale Lodge, 1856

Lady Maria Farquhar was born Maria Frances Geslin de Latour in India, in about 1790. Her father was Francis Latour a business man of Madras. Her father died in 1808 in London, and in the following year she married Sir Robert Townsend-Farquhar, who was about fifteen years older than she was. They had only one child, Sir Walter Minto Townsend-Farquhar.

Sir Robert Farquhar became Governor of Mauritius in 1810 and remained there until 1823. It was during this time that Maria met Letitia Luff, a friend of William Wordsworth, who had immigrated with her husband Charles to Mauritius from the Lake District in 1812. Charles died three years later in 1815, but Letitia remained in Mauritius until 1824 when she returned to the Lake District and rented a house near Ambleside called Fox Ghyll, which is still there today.

Sir Robert Farquhar died in 1830 and Maria was a widow at the age of only 40. She visited her friend Letitia Luff at Fox Ghyll, as William Wordsworth’s sister-in-law Sarah Hutchinson mentions this in her letters. It is probably during these visits that Lady Farquhar came to know William Wordsworth. In 1832 he gave her a book of his poetry with an inscription on the title page which is shown on the left. The inscription reads “To Lady Townshend Farquhar / in token of affectionate Regard / from her / Sincere Friend / Wm Wordsworth / Rydal Mount / 14th Novbr 1832.”

In 1834 Maria married Thomas Hamilton, a retired military Captain and author of several books. She however retained her title of Lady Farquhar. The couple moved to Elleray in the Lake District and became part of the Wordsworth’s social circle. In 1842 they went on a tour of the Continent, but unfortunately Thomas died in Italy. He was buried in Florence, and Lady Farquhar returned home. She moved from Elleray to Dale Lodge which at that time was called Dale Cottage. Shortly after this, Letitia Luff moved in with her and the two widows lived together at Dale Lodge for many years. Maria died in 1875 and the cottage passed to her daughter in law Lady Erica Farquhar.

== Lady Erica Farquhar ==
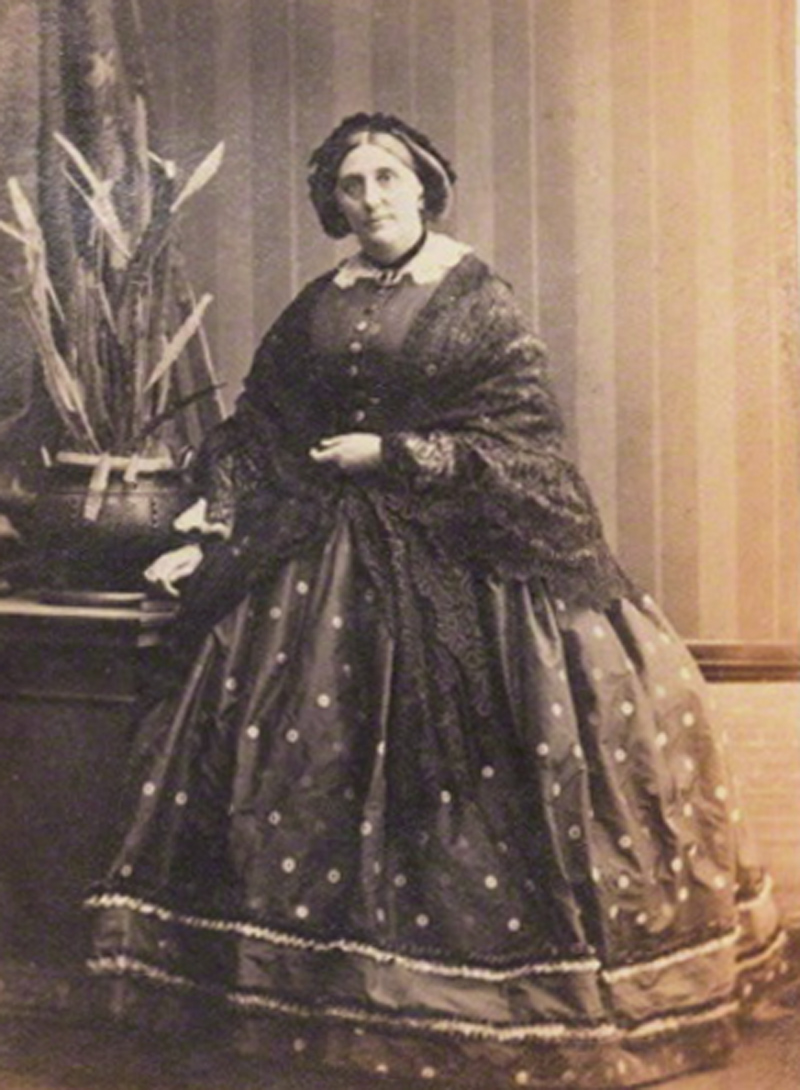
Lady Erica Farquhar

Lady Erica Farquhar was born Erica Catherine Mackay in 1818. She was the daughter of Eric Mackay, 7th Baron Reay. In 1835 she married Maria’s son, Sir Walter Minto Townsend-Farquhar, 2nd Bt. Sir Walter Farquhar was a Member of Parliament representing Hertford for some years. The couple had five children and the family lived for some years at Goldings near Hertford. He was a supporter of legislation against the use of child chimney sweeps following the death in 1852 of a seven-year-old sweep in a Goldings kitchen chimney.

In 1866 Sir Walter Farquhar died, and Erica moved to a house in Berkeley Square, London. When her mother-in-law Maria died in 1875, she inherited Dale Lodge and spent her time moving between her London house and Grasmere. Her son Sir Robert Farquhar also moved to Grasmere and resided in a house called “The Wray”.

Lady Erica Farquhar died in 1899, and a few years later Dale Lodge was sold. It became a hotel in about 1905.
