= Paul Feilde =

Paul Feilde (1711–1783) was a British lawyer and politician who sat in the House of Commons from 1770 to 1780.

Feilde was the fourth son of Edmund Feilde of Stanstead Abbots, Hertfordshire and his wife Martha Paul, daughter of James Paul of Braywick, Berkshire, and was baptised on 6 October 1711. He was educated at Westminster School in 1722 and was admitted at Lincoln's Inn in 1724.

In 1737 he was called to the bar and he was a London magistrate and a practising barrister until he succeeded to the family estates on the death of the last of his brothers in 1762. Also in 1762, he became Recorder of Hertford.

Feilde's great-grandfather Edmund Feilde had represented Hertford under Charles II and his father's cousin Thomas Plumer Byde had been MP for Hertfordshire from 1761 to 1768. Feilde himself was returned as Member of Parliament for Hertford at a contested by-election on 15 January 1770, probably with the support of the corporation and Dissenters and then returned unopposed at the 1774 general election. At the beginning of 1780 he was reported to be in poor health and did not stand at the 1780 general election.

He died on 2 February 1783. His monument in Stanstead church is inscribed: “He was an assiduous and able Member of Parliament, actuated by the purest patriotism, attached to no party, until a firm conviction engaged him in an early and strenuous opposition to the American war”. He had married Jane Wowen, daughter of John Wowen, sugar refiner, of Hackney on 12 February 1763 but had no children.

Parliament of Great Britain
Preceded by John Calvert; William Cowper	Member of Parliament for Hertford; 1770–1780; With: John Calvert	Succeeded by Thomas, Baron Dimsdale; William Baker
