= Robert Dimsdale =

English banker & politician (1828–1898)

Robert Dimsdale MP

Member of Parliament
- In office 1885–1892
- Preceded by: Constituency established
- Succeeded by: George Hudson
- Constituency: Hitchin
- In office 1866–1874 Serving with William Cowper-Temple
- Preceded by: Walter Townshend-Farquhar
- Succeeded by: Arthur Balfour
- Constituency: Hertford

Personal details
- Born: 1 July 1828 Hatfield, Hertfordshire, England
- Died: 2 May 1898 (aged 69)
- Party: Conservative
- Spouse: Cecilia Jane Southwell
- Education: Eton College; Corpus Christi College, Oxford

Robert Dimsdale (1 July 1828 – 2 May 1898) was an English banker and Conservative politician who sat in the House of Commons in two periods between 1866 and 1892.

== Biography ==
Dimsdale was born at Hatfield, Hertfordshire, the son of Charles John Dimsdale, and his wife Jemima Pye. He was educated at Eton and Corpus Christi College, Oxford. Dimsdale was a J.P. and a Deputy Lieutenant for Hertfordshire and a J.P. for Middlesex and Westminster.

In 1872 he became the sixth Baron Dimsdale of the Russian Empire on the death of his father, Charles John. The barony had been conferred by Catherine the Great on an ancestor, Thomas Dimsdale (1712–1800), who had inoculated the Empress and her son against smallpox in 1769.

Dimsdale stood unsuccessfully for parliament at Hertford in 1859. He was elected Member of Parliament for Hertford in 1866 and held the seat until 1874. He was elected for Hitchin in 1885, and held the seat until 1892.

Dimsdale married Cecilia Jane Southwell and lived at Essendon Place, Essendon, Hertfordshire which was the family seat. Their youngest son Captain W. P. Dimsdale, Royal Irish Rifles, died on 4 April 1900 near Reddersburg, South Africa, of wounds received in action during the Second Boer War.

Parliament of the United Kingdom
Preceded by William Francis Cowper; Sir Walter Townshend-Farquhar	Member of Parliament for Hertford; 1866 – 1874; With: William Francis Cowper to 1868	Succeeded by Arthur Balfour
New constituency	Member of Parliament for Hitchin; 1885 – 1892	Succeeded by George Bickersteth Hudson
