= Bengeo Rural =

Civil parish in Hertfordshire, United Kingdom

Coordinates: 51.838°N 0.065°W

- Civil parish
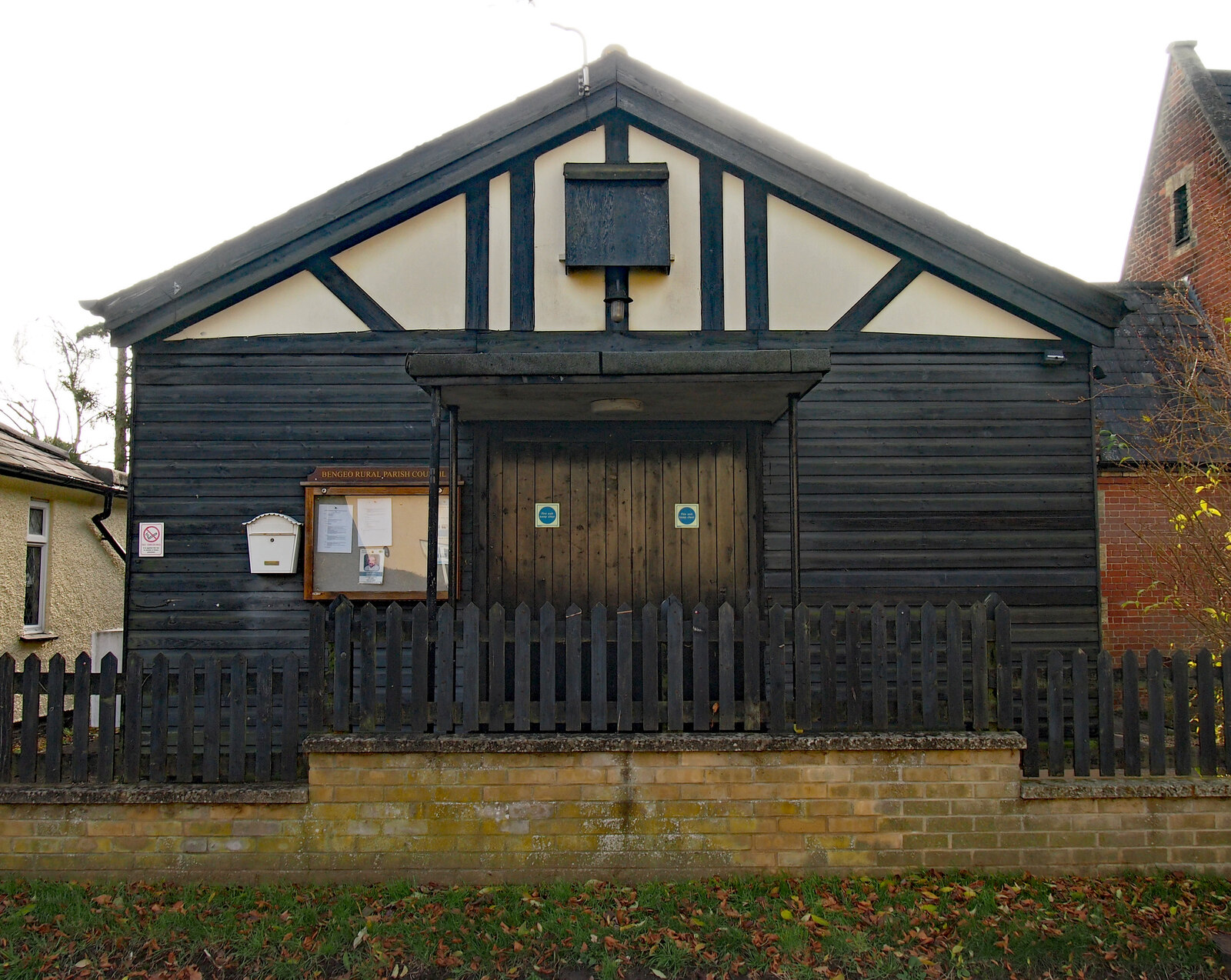
- Tonwell Village Hall

- Location within Hertfordshire
- Population: 614 (Parish, 2021)
- Civil parish: Bengeo Rural
- District: East Hertfordshire
- Shire county: Hertfordshire
- Region: East
- Country: England
- Sovereign state: United Kingdom
- Police: Hertfordshire
- Fire: Hertfordshire
- Ambulance: East of England
- UK Parliament: North East Hertfordshire

Bengeo Rural is a civil parish in the East Hertfordshire district of Hertfordshire, England. It was created in 1894 from the part of the former parish of Bengeo which lay outside the borough boundaries of Hertford. The main settlements in the parish of Bengeo Rural are Tonwell and Chapmore End; the parish does not include Bengeo itself, which forms part of Hertford. At the 2021 census the parish had a population of 614.

== History ==
Bengeo was an ancient parish in the Hertford Hundred of Hertfordshire.

In 1892, the borough boundaries of Hertford were extended in several directions. To the north of the town, the area added to the borough included the southern part of Bengeo parish, including the old village. Two years later, the Local Government Act 1894 directed that civil parishes could no longer straddle borough boundaries, and so the civil parish of Bengeo was split into a Bengeo Rural parish covering the areas outside the borough boundary, and a Bengeo Urban parish covering the areas within the borough. Bengeo Urban was short-lived as a parish; in 1900 all the parishes within the borough of Hertford were united into a Hertford parish matching the borough.

The parish of Bengeo Rural ceded further territory to Hertford in 1920 and 1935. In 1937, it ceded the village of Waterford to the neighbouring parish of Stapleford. Since 1937 the main settlements in the parish have therefore been Tonwell and Chapmore End.

== Governance ==
There are three tiers of local government covering Bengeo Rural, at parish, district, and county level: Bengeo Rural Parish Council, East Hertfordshire District Council, and Hertfordshire County Council. The parish council generally meets at Tonwell Village Hall.
