= Nathaniel Dimsdale =

English physician and politician

Nathaniel Dimsdale, FRS (11 April 1748 – 3 July 1811), a British physician and MP who received a Barony of the Russian Empire for his work in Russia on smallpox vaccination.

He was the second son of the Quaker Thomas Dimsdale, a Hertfordshire physician, banker, and MP, and was educated at Eton College. After travelling with his father to St. Petersburg in 1768 to inoculate Catherine the Great and her son, Grand Duke Paul, against smallpox, he, along with his father, received an annuity and was created Baron Dimsdale of the Russian Empire. On his return, he studied medicine at the University of Edinburgh, graduating with an MB in 1771.

He returned to Russia with his father in 1781 to carry out further inoculations within the Russian royal family. He became a partner in the family bank of Baron Dimsdale, Sons, Barnard and Staples, established by his father. When his father retired in 1790, he succeeded to his father's Parliamentary seat for Hertford, holding it until 1802.

In 1805, he was elected a Fellow of the Royal Society.

By then, he was not in good health and died on a trip for his health to Brighton in 1811. He was unmarried and left his estate to his sister, Ann Dimsdale. His barony lapsed on his death, but that of his father passed down in the family via his elder brother John.

Parliament of Great Britain
Preceded by Thomas Dimsdale; John Calvert	Member of Parliament for Hertford; 1790–1800; With: John Calvert	Succeeded by Parliament of the United Kingdom
Parliament of the United Kingdom
Preceded by Parliament of Great Britain	Member of Parliament for Hertford; 1801–1802; With: John Calvert	Succeeded by Hon. Edward Spencer Cowper; Nicolson Calvert
