= Waterford, Hertfordshire =

Village in England

Coordinates: 51.81799°N 0.0987°W

Waterford
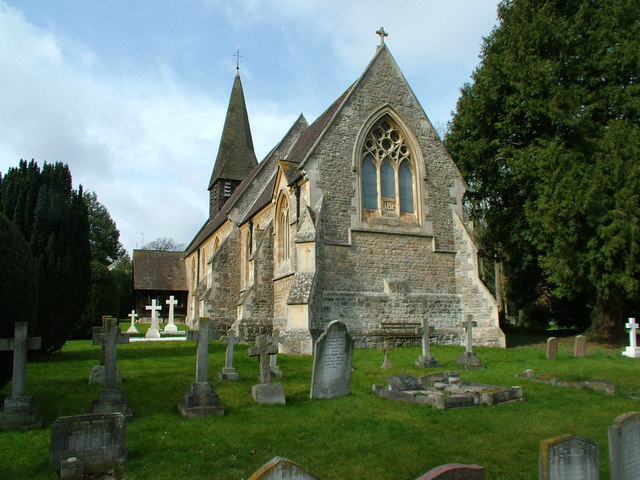
- St. Michael and All Angels Church, Waterford

- Location within Hertfordshire
- OS grid reference: TL311150
- Civil parish: Stapleford and Waterford
- District: East Hertfordshire
- Shire county: Hertfordshire
- Region: East
- Country: England
- Sovereign state: United Kingdom
- Post town: HERTFORD
- Postcode district: SG14
- Dialling code: 01992
- Police: Hertfordshire
- Fire: Hertfordshire
- Ambulance: East of England
- UK Parliament: North East Hertfordshire

Waterford is a village in the civil parish of Stapleford and Waterford, in the East Hertfordshire district of Hertfordshire, England. It is located on the A119 road, around 2.5 km (1.6 miles) north of Hertford. The River Beane flows through the village.

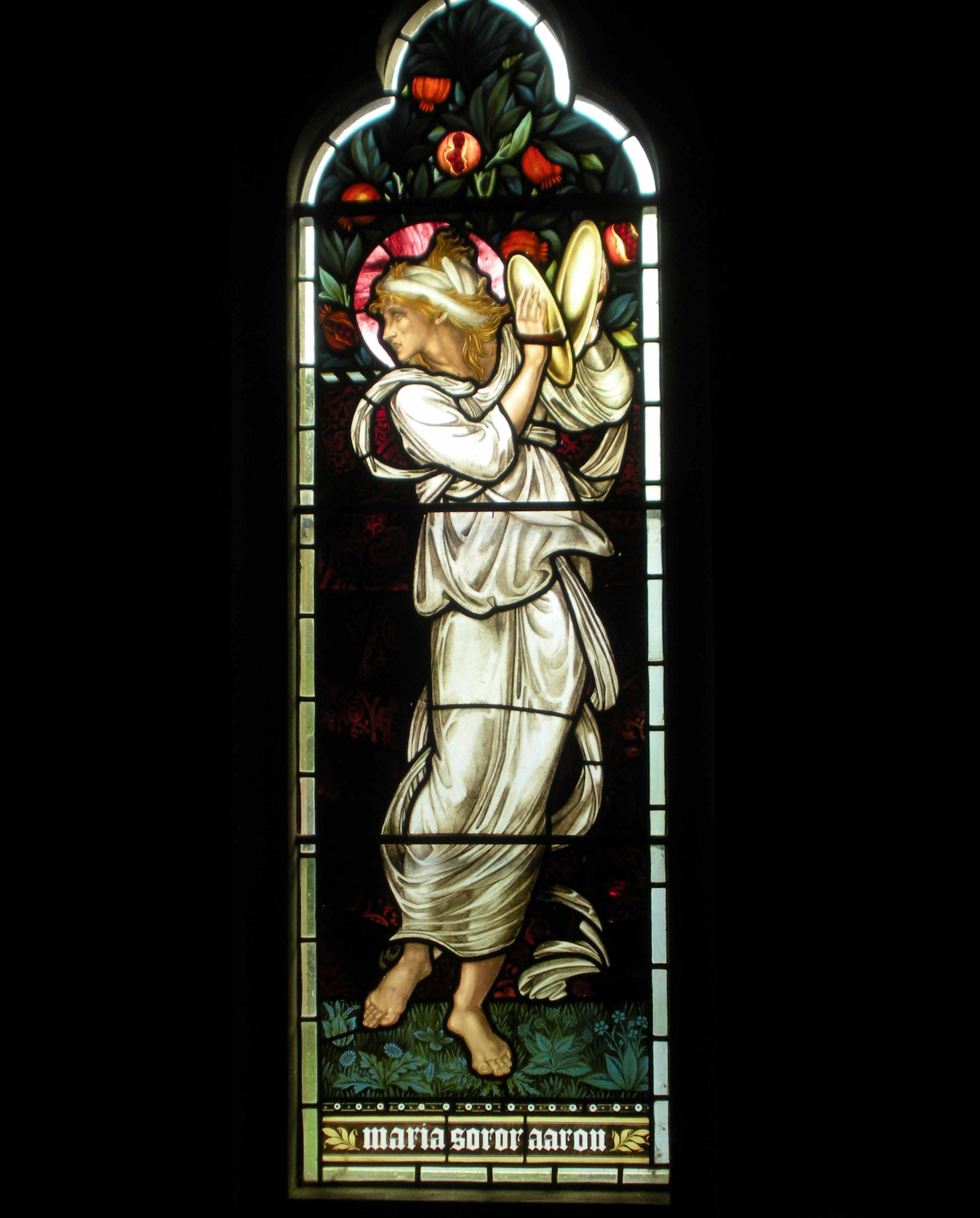
"Miriam" by Sir Edward Burne-Jones, 1872

Waterford is most notable for the church of St Michael and All Angels, built by Robert and Isabel Smith in 1871/2, which has Pre-Raphaelite stained-glass windows from the Morris & Co. factory. They date from the church's original construction through to 1937 and include Miriam by Edward Burne-Jones. The church is listed as being of special architectural and historic interest (Grade II*).

St Michael and All Angels is an example of Victorian construction in the Early English Gothic style. It was financed by Robert Smith, owner of the Goldings estate close to the church. All wood used in constructing the church came from the Estate. The roof is lined with Broseley tiles and the bell tower and octagonal spire with cedar shingles. The porch is of oak construction.

There are 14 stained-glass windows; eight by Burne-Jones, and others by William Morris, Douglas Strachan, Ford Madox Brown, Karl Parsons and Selwyn Image. Tracery above the three west windows was done by Philip Webb.

Goldings is a Grade II* listed country house which was used as a Dr. Barnardo's Home between 1922 and 1967 and has now been converted to apartments. Several Barnardo's children are buried in St Michael's churchyard, which also contains graves of the Abel Smith family including Robert and Isabel Smith.

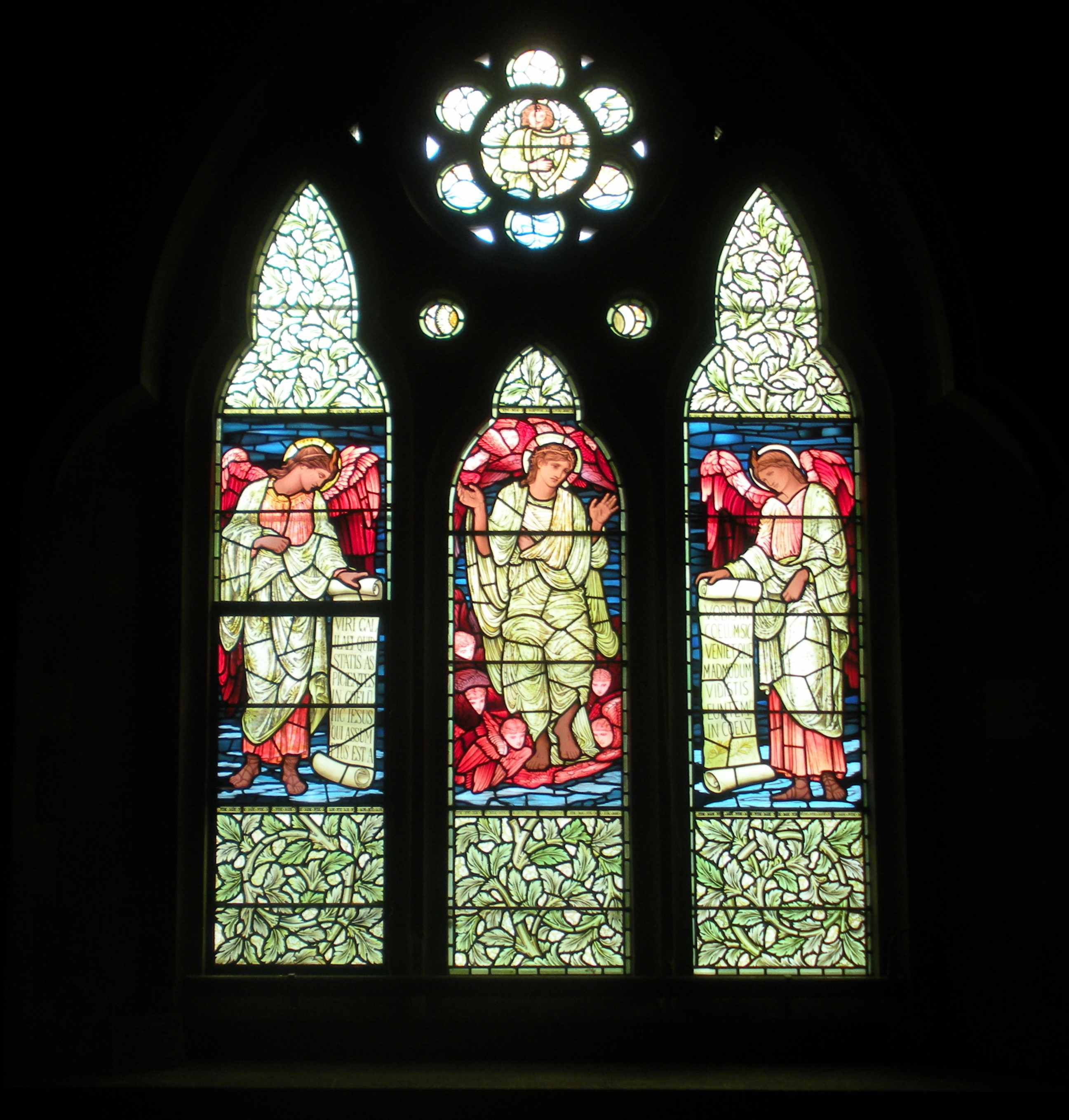
"Christ as Salvator Mundi" by Sir Edward Burne-Jones

Waterford historically formed part of the ancient parish of Bengeo. That parish was split in 1894, when Waterford became part of the new Bengeo Rural parish which covered the parts of the old parish outside the borough boundaries of Hertford. In 1937, Waterford was transferred from Bengeo Rural to Stapleford parish.
