= James Cowper =

English lawyer and politician

James Cowper (1622–1683) was an English lawyer and politician who sat in the House of Commons at various times between 1656 and 1660.

Cowper was the son of Sir William Cowper, 1st Baronet of Ratling Court, Nonington, Kent and his wife Martha Master, daughter of James Master of East Langdon, Kent. He was baptised on 8 December 1622. He was admitted at Emmanuel College, Cambridge on 7 July 1640 and at Lincoln's Inn on 9 February 1643. He was called to the bar in 1650 but during the Interregnum, he became a property developer. In 1656, he was elected Member of Parliament for Hertford in the Second Protectorate Parliament. He was re-elected MP for Hertford in 1659 for the Third Protectorate Parliament. In March 1660 he was commissioner for militia for Hertfordshire and became J.P, retaining the position until 1678.

In 1660 Cowper was elected MP for Hertford again in the Convention Parliament. He was commissioner for over and terminer on the Home circuit in July 1660 and commissioner for assessment for Hertfordshire from August 1660 to 1661.

Cowper died at the age of about 60 and was buried at St Michael, Cornhill on 8 August 1683.

Cowper married Anne Wroth, daughter of John Wroth of Loughton, Essex on 9 May 1657. They had two sons and a daughter. His widow married George Howard, 4th Earl of Suffolk and died on 2 July 1710.

Parliament of England
Preceded by Isaac Pulter	Member of Parliament for Hertford; 1656–1659; With: Isaac Pulter	Succeeded by Not represented in Restored Rump
Preceded by Not represented in Restored Rump	Member of Parliament for Hertford; 1656; With: Arthur Sparke	Succeeded by Sir Edward Turnor; Thomas Fanshawe
