= Goldings estate =

Country house in Hertfordshire, England

Coordinates: 51°48′40″N 00°06′00″W

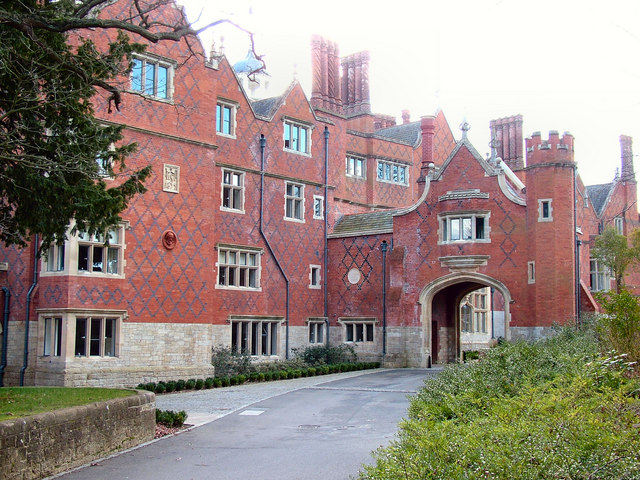
Goldings

Goldings Estate is a large Elizabethan style country house and surrounding land close to Waterford, north of Hertford, Hertfordshire, England. The house was designed by George Devey (1820–1886), constructed between 1871 and 1877, and is a Grade II* listed building.

== History ==
The earliest known Goldings mansion was built about 1700 for Thomas Hall, Squire of Bengeo. In 1811 the estate was sold to Samuel Smith, (son of Abel Smith (1717–1788)), who had already acquired the adjoining estate of Woodhall Park in 1801. Goldings was inherited by his eldest son, Abel, in 1834 who in turn gifted the estate to his second son, the merchant banker Robert, when Robert married Isabel Adeane in 1857.

Robert and Isabel took possession of the estate in 1860, it having been let to Eric Mackay, 7th Lord Reay who lived there with his daughter, Erica, and her husband, Sir Walter Townsend-Farquhar, 2nd Baronet. The new owners of the Estate undertook a major programme of renovation of the Estate including improving cottages, building a school in the village of Waterford and diverting Turnpike Road at their own expense. The new road opened in 1869.

Robert was the Sheriff of Hertfordshire for 1869-70.

Robert and Isabel built a church to the "Glory of God". Henry Woodyer was commissioned to design the building which was built by C Chapple of Tring between 1871 and 1872. It was consecrated as St Michael and All Angels on St James's Day 1872. Its detail includes Pre-Raphaelite stained-glass windows from the Morris & Co. factory.

A new house for the Estate, first occupied at Easter 1876, was designed by George Devey to be sited on higher ground away from the unhealthy mists in the valley of the River Beane. When the new house was completed, the older house was demolished.

On Robert’s death on 21 October 1894, the Estate passed to his eldest son, Reginald Abel who, in 1885, had married the Hon. Margaret Alice Holland, the daughter of Henry Holland, 1st Viscount Knutsford and Margaret Trevelyan (niece of Lord Macaulay). Tragedy struck the family in 1902 when both Reginald, aged 45, and his eldest 13-year-old son, Cyril, died of illness within 6 weeks of each other. Reginald’s eldest child, Margaret Isabel, then aged 15, took over the day to day running of the Estate on behalf of her mother.

This left Goldings to another Reginald Abel Smith, a grandson of the original owner Robert Smith. Reginald married Myrtle Abercromby in 1913.

Most large private Houses were used as hospitals for the wounded of the Great War. Mrs Reginald Abel Smith was reported in The Herts Advertiser of July 1916 to have 16 beds available for injured soldiers at Goldings to convalesce till after the war.

Two years later in 1920, Myrtle died. Goldings was empty most of the time and was the charge of Mr. Burbidge, the Estate Bailiff, who resided in Wych Elms Cottage Goldings.

In July 1920, Goldings was put up for auction along with most of Waterford and the surrounding area, with Messrs Knight, Frank and Rutley as the agents.Due to dealings with the late Dr. Thomas Barnardo, the Abel Smith family sold Goldings in 1921 to Dr Barnardo Homes for the sum of £100,000 which had been set off in a loan, that by all accounts was never called in.

The house was used as an orphanage and, in 1923, was modified and enlarged and a chapel added. In 1960 a new wing was added. In 1967 the orphanage closed and Goldings was purchased by Hertfordshire County Council for use by the County Surveyor's Department.
