= Derek Walker-Smith, Baron Broxbourne =

British politician (1910–1992)

Baron Broxbourne TD, PC, QC
- By Godfrey Argent 1969

Minister of Health
- In office 17 September 1957 – 27 July 1960
- Prime Minister: Harold Macmillan
- Preceded by: Dennis Vosper
- Succeeded by: Enoch Powell
Junior Ministerial offices
Minister of State for Trade
In office 16 January 1957 – 17 September 1957
| Prime Minister | Harold Macmillan |
| Preceded by | Derick Heathcoat-Amory |
| Succeeded by | John Vaughan-Morgan |
Economic Secretary to the Treasury
In office 11 November 1956 – 16 January 1957
| Prime Minister | Anthony Eden |
| Preceded by | Edward Boyle |
| Succeeded by | Nigel Birch |
Parliamentary Secretary to the Board of Trade
In office 19 October 1955 – 11 November 1956
| Prime Minister | Anthony Eden |
| Preceded by | Donald Kaberry |
| Succeeded by | Frederick Erroll |

Chairman of the 1922 Committee
- In office 29 November 1951 – 19 October 1955
- Leader: Winston Churchill; Anthony Eden
- Preceded by: Arnold Gridley
- Succeeded by: John Morrison

Member of Parliament for East Hertfordshire Hertford (1945–55)
- In office 5 July 1945 – 13 May 1983
- Preceded by: Murray Sueter
- Succeeded by: Marion Roe (Broxbourne)

Personal details
- Born: Derek Colclough Walker-Smith; 13 April 1910
- Died: 22 January 1992 (aged 81)
- Party: Conservative
- Parents: Jonah Walker-Smith (father); Maud Hunter (mother)
- Education: Rossall School
- Alma mater: Christ Church, Oxford
- Occupation: Barrister

Derek Colclough Walker-Smith, Baron Broxbourne, TD, PC, QC (13 April 1910 – 22 January 1992), known as Sir Derek Walker-Smith, Bt, from 1960 to 1983, was a British Conservative Party politician.

== Early life and career ==
The son of Sir Jonah Walker-Smith (1874–1964) and his wife Maud, daughter of Coulton Walker Hunter, Walker-Smith was educated at Rossall School and Christ Church, Oxford. He became a barrister, called to the bar by Middle Temple in 1934. He joined the British Army and after the outbreak of World War II he attended the Staff College, Camberley, where Brian Horrocks was among his instructors. He was vice-chairman of the Inns of Court Conservative and Unionist Society and was made Queen's Counsel in 1955.

== Political career ==
Walker-Smith was the Member of Parliament (MP) for Hertford from 1945 to 1955, and East Hertfordshire from 1955 to 1983. He was Chairman of the 1922 Committee 1951–1955. He held ministerial positions, including Economic Secretary to the Treasury (1956–1957), at the Board of Trade (1955–1956 and 1957), and Health (1957–1959).

Walker-Smith was created a baronet, of Broxbourne in the County of Hertford, in 1960. On 21 September 1983, he was granted a life peerage as Baron Broxbourne, of Broxbourne in the County of Hertfordshire. His son Jonah succeeded to the hereditary baronetcy. His daughter Deborah (died 2022) married Christopher Sinclair-Stevenson in 1965.

Coat of arms of Derek Walker-Smith, Baron Broxbourne

Crest
1st out of a mural crown Gules masoned Or a mount Vert thereon a lion standant Argent holding in the dexter forepaw a sword pommel Proper pommel hilt and quillons also Or the blade environed by an oak branch fructed Gold (Smith), 2nd between two ostrich feathers Gules quilled Or a leg in armour Azure garnished Gold (Walker).
Escutcheon
Quarterly: 1st and 4th per fess Or and Argent a portcullis Sable throughout raised to the nombril point within a bordure per fess Gules and Or charged with tern acorns counter coloured (Smith); 2nd and 3rd per pale Azure and Gules a horse passant Argent hooved and crined Or between three caltrops Gold (Walker).
Motto
Legge Et Luce

== Bibliography ==
- Horrocks, Sir Brian (1960). A Full Life. Barnsley: Leo Cooper. ISBN 0-85052-144-0.

== Sources ==
- Times Guide to the House of Commons, 1979
- Leigh Rayment's Peerage Pages
- Leigh Rayment's Historical List of MPs

Parliament of the United Kingdom
| Preceded by Murray Sueter | Member of Parliament for Hertford; 1945–1955 | Succeeded by Himself as MP for East Hertfordshire |
| Preceded by Murray Sueter | Member of Parliament for Hertford; 1945–1955 | Succeeded by Robert Lindsay |
| Preceded by Himself as MP for Hertford | Member of Parliament for East Hertfordshire; 1955–1983 | Succeeded by Marion Roe as MP for Broxbourne |
Baronetage of the United Kingdom
| New creation | Baronet (of Broxbourne); 1960–1992 | Succeeded by Jonah Walker-Smith |
Political offices
| Preceded by Edward Boyle | Economic Secretary to the Treasury; 1956–1957 | Succeeded by Nigel Birch |
| Preceded by Dennis Vosper | Minister of Health; 1957–1960 | Succeeded by Enoch Powell |
