= William Baker (politician, born 1743) =

British politician

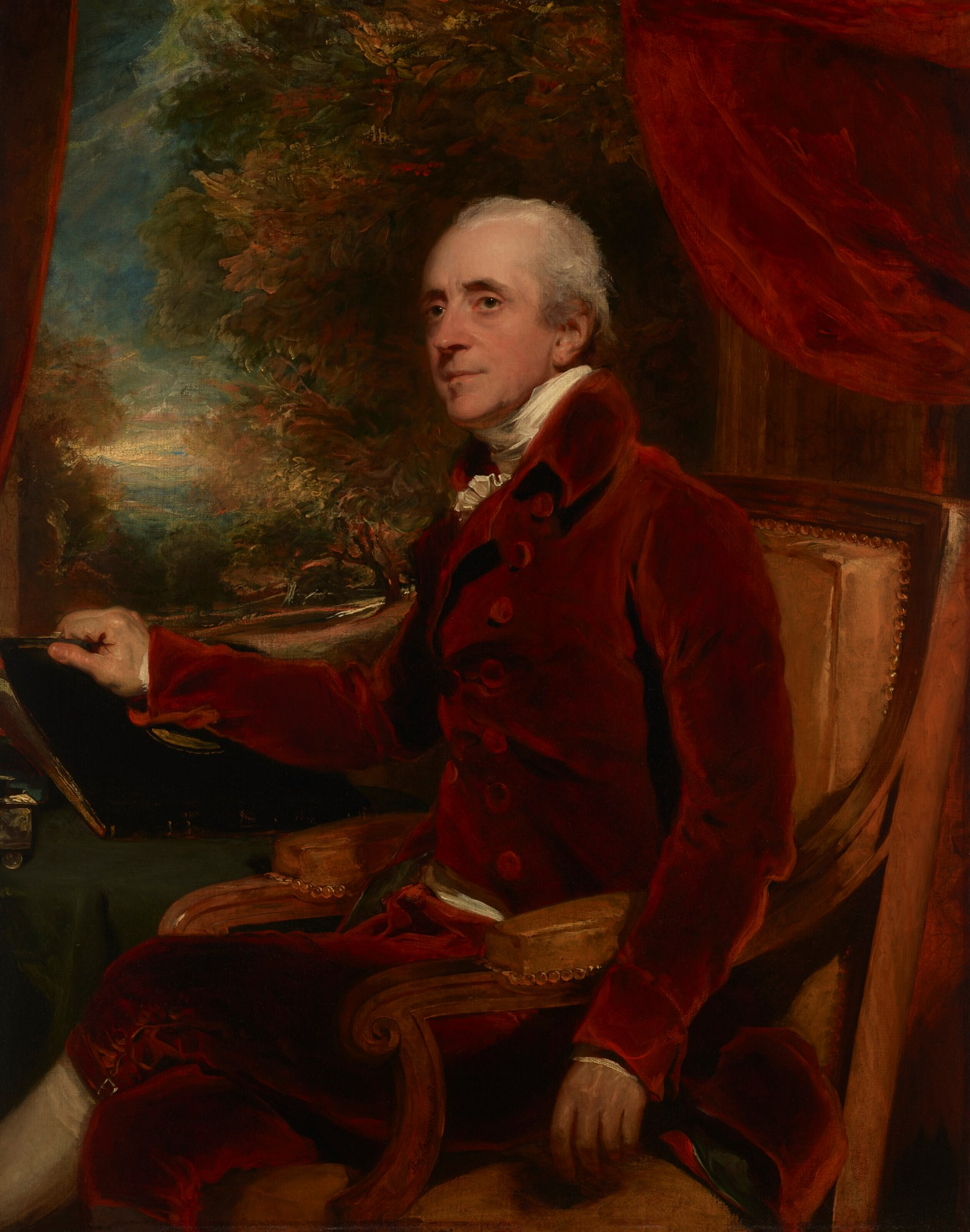
William Baker (1743–1824), painting by Thomas Lawrence, 1807.

William Baker (3 October 1743 – 20 January 1824) was a British politician.

== Life ==
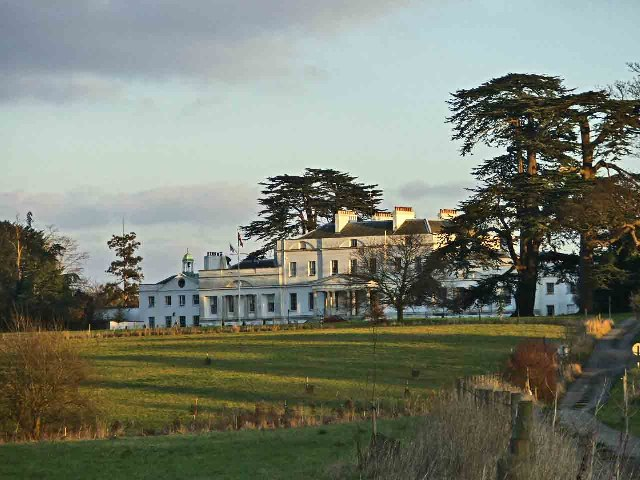
Bayfordbury House

William Baker was the eldest son of Sir William Baker, MP, educated at Eton College (1753–60). Admitted to Clare College, Cambridge in 1761, he did not matriculate there. He studied law at the Inner Temple (1761), where he was called to the bar in 1775. He succeeded his father in 1770, inheriting and renovating the Bayfordbury country house in Hertfordshire. He was elected a Sheriff of London for the same year.

Baker was the Member of Parliament for Plympton Erle 22 March 1768 – 10 October 1774, Aldborough 4 March 1777 – 8 September 1780, Hertford 7 September 1780 – 30 March 1784, and Hertfordshire 23 June 1790 – 10 July 1802 and 11 February 1805 – 11 May 1807.

He died at the age of 80. He had married twice: firstly with Juliana, the daughter of Thomas Penn of Stoke Park, Buckinghamshire and the granddaughter of William Penn, Governor of Pennsylvania, with whom he had a daughter; and secondly with Sophia, the daughter of John Conyers of Copt Hall, Essex, with whom he had 9 sons and 6 daughters, including Colonel George Baker.

== Notes ==
Parliament of Great Britain
Preceded by Sir William Baker; Paul Henry Ourry	Member of Parliament for Plympton Erle; 1768–1774; With: Paul Henry Ourry	Succeeded by Paul Henry Ourry; Sir Richard Philipps
Preceded by Charles Wilkinson; Abel Smith	Member of Parliament for Aldborough; 1777–1780; With: Abel Smith 1777–1778; Hon. William Hanger 1778–1780	Succeeded by Sir Richard Sutton; Charles Mellish
Preceded by John Calvert; Paul Feilde	Member of Parliament for Hertford; 1780–1784; With: Thomas Dimsdale	Succeeded by Thomas Dimsdale; John Calvert
Preceded by William Plumer; The Viscount Grimston	Member of Parliament for Hertfordshire; 1790–1800; With: William Plumer	Succeeded by Parliament of the United Kingdom
Parliament of the United Kingdom
Preceded by Parliament of Great Britain	Member of Parliament for Hertfordshire; 1801–1802; With: William Plumer	Succeeded by William Plumer; Hon. Peniston Lamb
Preceded by William Plumer; Hon. Peniston Lamb	Member of Parliament for Hertfordshire; 1805–1807; With: William Plumer	Succeeded by Hon. Thomas Brand; Sir John Sebright
