= Baron Dimsdale =

Baron Dimsdale is a title which was conferred on the physician Thomas Dimsdale of Hertfordshire by the Russian royal family.

Dimsdale, who had a high reputation in the new field of smallpox inoculation and had written a book on the subject, was invited in 1762 by Catherine the Great to travel to Russia and inoculate herself and her son, Grand-Duke Paul. Accordingly, Dimsdale and his second son Nathaniel travelled to Russia in 1768 and carried out the procedure to the great satisfaction of the Empress, who rewarded both him and his son with annuities and a Barony of the Russian Empire, with the right for it to be inherited by the eldest lawful descendants.

Nathaniel died with no male heir. The Barony awarded to his father, however, descended via his eldest son John (1747–1820) for several generations. On John's death it passed to his brother Robert (1756–1825) and thence to the latter's eldest son, Thomas Robert (1796–1865), who was High Sheriff of Hertfordshire in 1831. He was succeeded by his brother, Charles John (1801–1872), High Sheriff of Hertfordshire in 1843, and he in turn by his son Robert (1828–1898), banker and MP for Hertford.

Charles Robert Southwell (1856–1928) was High Sheriff of Hertfordshire in 1917. His two eldest sons were killed in the First World War and so the Barony was inherited by Thomas Edward (1911–1985), High Sheriff of Hertfordshire in 1974. The recent Baron, Robert Edward was High Sheriff of the county in 1996.

The title could be officially used in the United Kingdom from 1813 until the death of Thomas Edward Dimsdale in 1985. The family seat was Essendon Place, Essendon, Hertfordshire.

== Barons Dimsdale (c. 1769) ==
- Thomas Dimsdale (1712–1800) and Nathaniel Dimsdale (1748–1811)
- John Dimsdale (1747–1820)
- Robert Dimsdale (1756–1825)
- Thomas Robert Dimsdale (1796–1865)
- Charles John Dimsdale (1801–1872)
- Robert Dimsdale (1828–1898)
- Charles Robert Southwell Dimsdale (1856–1928)
- Thomas Edward Dimsdale (1911–1985)
- Robert Edward Dimsdale (1938–2019)
- Edward Dimsdale (1965–)
