= Walker-Smith baronets =

Baronetcy in the Baronetage of the United Kingdom

The Walker-Smith Baronetcy, of Broxbourne in the County of Hertford, is a title in the Baronetage of the United Kingdom. It was created on 18 July 1960 for the Conservative politician Derek Walker-Smith. On his retirement from the House of Commons in 1983 he was further honoured when he was created a life peer as Baron Broxbourne, of Broxbourne in the County of Hertfordshire. The life barony became extinct on his death in 1992 while he was succeeded in the baronetcy by his son, the second holder of the title. He died in 2024 and was succeeded by his only son, the third baronet.

== Walker-Smith Baronets, of Broxbourne (1960) ==
- Sir Derek Colclough Walker-Smith, 1st Baronet (1910–1992) (created Baron Broxbourne in 1983)
- The Hon. Sir (John) Jonah Walker-Smith, 2nd Baronet (1939–2024)
- Sir Daniel Derek Walker-Smith, 3rd Baronet (born 1980).

Coat of arms of Walker-Smith baronets

Crest
1st out of a mural crown Gules masoned Or a mount Vert thereon a lion standant Argent holding in the dexter forepaw a sword pommel Proper pommel hilt and quillons also Or the blade environed by an oak branch fructed Gold (Smith), 2nd between two ostrich feathers Gules quilled Or a leg in armour Azure garnished Gold (Walker).
Escutcheon
Quarterly: 1st and 4th per fess Or and Argent a portcullis Sable throughout raised to the nombril point within a bordure per fess Gules and Or charged with tern acorns counter coloured (Smith); 2nd and 3rd per pale Azure and Gules a horse passant Argent hooved and crined Or between three caltrops Gold (Walker).
Motto
Legge Et Luce
