= George Baker (officer) =

Colonel George Baker (8 January 1794–22 December 1859) was a British military officer.

Born in Walthamstow, he was the son of politician William Baker and his wife, Sophia Conyers.

In 1830, he was appointed a commissioner to Greece to serve on the International Boundary Commission that was to decide on the northern border of the new kingdom. His fellow commissioners were the Russian general A. de Scalon and the French Colonel J. Barthélemy.

The commission began its work in 1832, concluding it two years later.

“The map of the borderline would be the subject of an endless diplomatic tug-of-war before being accepted by the Sublime Porte in December 1835.”

Baker later wrote the “Memoir on the Northern Frontier of Greece” in the Journal of the Royal Geographical Society of London.

He served in the 16th (Queen's) Lancers.

He died in Bath.
