= East Hertfordshire (constituency) =

Parliamentary constituency in the United Kingdom, 1955–1983

- Former borough constituency for the House of Commons
- East Hertfordshire in Hertfordshire, showing boundaries used from 1974–1983

1955–1983
- Seats: one
- Created from: Hertford
- Replaced by: Broxbourne, Hertford & Stortford and Stevenage

East Hertfordshire was a parliamentary constituency in the county of Hertfordshire from 1955 to 1983. It returned one Member of Parliament (MP) to the House of Commons of the Parliament of the United Kingdom.

== History ==
The constituency was created for the 1955 general election, formed primarily from the majority of the Hertford constituency which was significantly revised. It was abolished for the 1983 general election when it was largely divided between the new constituencies of Broxbourne, and Hertford and Stortford.

Throughout its existence the seat was held for the Conservatives by Sir Derek Walker-Smith.

The writer and TV playwright Dennis Potter was the Labour Party candidate in the constituency at the 1964 general election, but finished second behind the Conservative incumbent. His experience inspired Vote, Vote, Vote for Nigel Barton.

== Boundaries and boundary changes ==
=== 1955–1974 ===
- The Urban Districts of Bishop's Stortford, Cheshunt, Hoddesdon, Sawbridgeworth, and Ware; and
- The Rural Districts of Braughing and Ware

The bulk of the constituency was formed from the majority of the Hertford constituency which was significantly revised. A part of the Rural District of Braughing was transferred from Hitchin.

=== 1974–1983 ===
- The Urban Districts of Bishop's Stortford, Cheshunt, Hoddesdon, and Sawbridgeworth; and
- The Rural Districts of Braughing and Ware

The Urban District of Ware was transferred to the new constituency of Hertford and Stevenage.

On abolition, southern parts (consisting the majority of the electorate), largely comprising the former Urban Districts of Cheshunt and Hoddesdon (combined to form the District of Broxbourne under the local government reorganisation of 1974) formed the bulk of the new borough constituency of Broxbourne. With the exception of some rural parts in the north-west of the constituency, which were included in the new constituency of Stevenage, the remainder of the seat (including Bishop's Stortford and Sawbridgeworth) was amalgamated with the Hertford and Ware part of Hertford and Stevenage to form the new Hertford and Stortford constituency.

== Members of Parliament ==
Election	Member	Party
1955	Sir Derek Walker-Smith	Conservative
1983	constituency abolished: see Hertford and Stortford & Broxbourne	

== Elections ==
=== Elections in the 1950s ===
General election 1955: East Hertfordshire
Party	Candidate	Votes	%	±%
Conservative	Derek Walker-Smith	26,936	56.88	
Labour Co-op	William Hilton	20,418	43.12	
Majority		6,518	13.76	
Turnout		47,354	79.11	
Conservative win (new seat)				

General election 1959: East Hertfordshire
Party	Candidate	Votes	%	±%
Conservative	Derek Walker-Smith	28,201	51.39	
Labour	Syd Bidwell	18,020	32.84	
Liberal	Kenneth John Whitehead Spargo	8,656	15.77	New
Majority		10,181	18.55	
Turnout		54,877	82.01	
Conservative hold		Swing		

=== Elections in the 1960s ===
General election 1964: East Hertfordshire
Party	Candidate	Votes	%	±%
Conservative	Derek Walker-Smith	29,749	48.20	
Labour	Dennis Potter	21,887	35.46	
Liberal	Eric W Morgan	10,088	16.34	
Majority		7,862	12.74	
Turnout		61,724	81.02	
Conservative hold		Swing		

General election 1966: East Hertfordshire
Party	Candidate	Votes	%	±%
Conservative	Derek Walker-Smith	29,618	46.62	
Labour	Brian CS Murphy	24,412	38.43	
Liberal	Eric W Morgan	9,501	14.95	
Majority		5,206	8.19	
Turnout		63,531	80.09	
Conservative hold		Swing		

=== Elections in the 1970s ===
General election 1970: East Hertfordshire
Party	Candidate	Votes	%	±%
Conservative	Derek Walker-Smith	37,668	54.74	
Labour	Mike Thomas	23,601	34.30	
Liberal	David Walsh	7,538	10.96	
Majority		14,067	20.44	
Turnout		68,807	73.51	
Conservative hold		Swing		

General election February 1974: East Hertfordshire
Party	Candidate	Votes	%	±%
Conservative	Derek Walker-Smith	32,032	44.96	
Labour	MM Keir	20,674	29.02	
Liberal	PC Clark	18,546	26.03	
Majority		11,358	15.94	
Turnout		71,252	80.98	
Conservative hold		Swing		

General election October 1974: East Hertfordshire
Party	Candidate	Votes	%	±%
Conservative	Derek Walker-Smith	29,334	44.59	
Labour	MM Keir	20,999	31.92	
Liberal	PC Clark	15,446	23.48	
Majority		8,335	12.67	
Turnout		65,779	74.04	
Conservative hold		Swing		

General election 1979: East Hertfordshire
Party	Candidate	Votes	%	±%
Conservative	Derek Walker-Smith	41,599	55.50	
Labour Co-op	I. J. Evans	20,139	26.87	
Liberal	Lesley Abdela	11,393	15.20	
National Front	J. Smith	1,819	2.43	New
Majority		21,460	28.63	
Turnout		74,950	77.81	
Conservative hold		Swing		
