= Elizabeth Dimsdale =

British diarist and recipe collector

Baroness Elizabeth Dimsdale
- Born: Elizabeth Dimsdale; 29 April 1732; Bishop's Stortford
- Died: 16 October 1812 (aged 80); Hertford
- Occupations: housekeeper, diarist and recipe collector.
- Spouse: Thomas Dimsdale

Elizabeth Dimsdale (29 April 1732 – 16 October 1812) was a British diarist and recipe collector.

== Life ==
Dimsdale was born in 1732 in Bishop's Stortford.

She lived in the household of Thomas Dimsdale and they shared the same family name as they were first cousins via their fathers (and via their mothers).

Thomas first went to Russia in 1768 and Catherine the Great made him a Baron.

When Thomas was in his seventies, his second wife died. Elizabeth married him and she became a Baroness. In 1781 Thomas Dimsdale was summoned again to the court of Catherine the Great. This time he was to inoculate her grandchildren and Elizabeth went with him and she kept a detailed journal. They had an apartment in Tsarskoye Selo with their own housekeeper/cook and crimson silk furniture. At one point she prepared a medicine for the empress as prescribed by Thomas. Elizabeth noted the Amber Room and rich possessions where they were staying and in the Hermitage museum, but she also noted that many of the Russian people were treated as possessions and slaves.

Her husband died in 1800. Around this time she compiled a book of recipes, which were then known as receipts.

== Death and legacy ==
Dimsdale died in 1812 near Hertford.

In 1989 a book based on her journal of her trip to Russia was published. It was titled "An English Lady at the Court of Catherine the Great: The Journal of Baroness Elizabeth Dimsdale, 1781".

Her recipe book was published by the Hertfordshire Record Society.
