= Chapmore End =

Village in Hertfordshire, England

Coordinates: 51.8312°N 0.0703°W

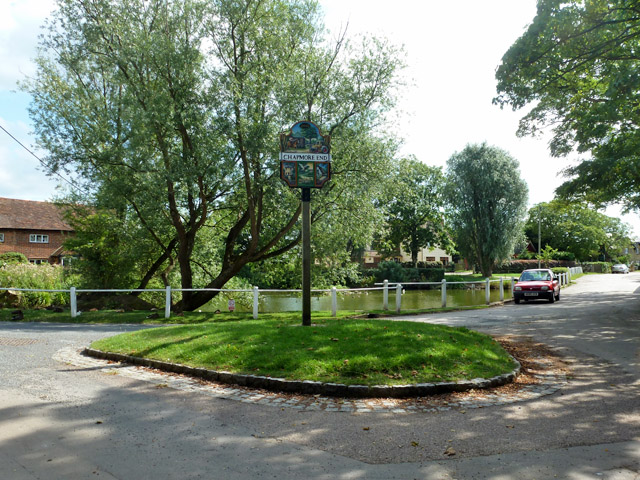
- Chapmore End sign and pond

- Location within Hertfordshire
- Population: < 300
- OS grid reference: TL329165
- District: East Hertfordshire
- Shire county: Hertfordshire
- Region: East
- Country: England
- Sovereign state: United Kingdom
- Post town: Ware
- Postcode district: SG12
- Dialling code: 01920
- Police: Hertfordshire
- Fire: Hertfordshire
- Ambulance: East of England
- UK Parliament: North East Hertfordshire

Chapmore End is a village in Bengeo Rural parish, Hertfordshire. At the 2011 Census the population of the hamlet was included in the town of Ware.

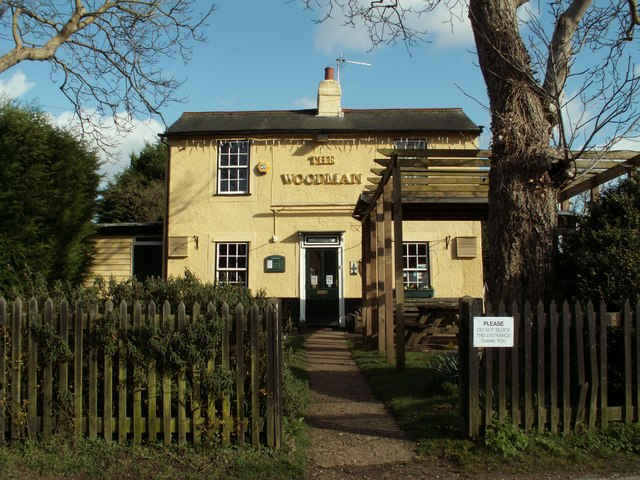
The Woodman pub

The village consists of a few houses and a pub, the Woodman, and is situated just off the B158 approximately three miles north of Hertford.

On the other side of the B158 in the Rib Valley is the former Hertford County Reformatory for boys, which was in operation between 1858 and 1981, and is now a private residential area known as Crouchfields.

Chapmore End has close ties with the nearby village of Tonwell, where the former parish church is situated, along with the parish village hall. The two villages also hold combined events such as the village fete.

The village association have their own web site.
