= Hertford (hundred) =

Historical division of Hertfordshire, England

Hertford hundred was a judicial and taxation subdivision (a "hundred") of Hertfordshire, in the east of the county, that existed from the 10th to the 19th century.

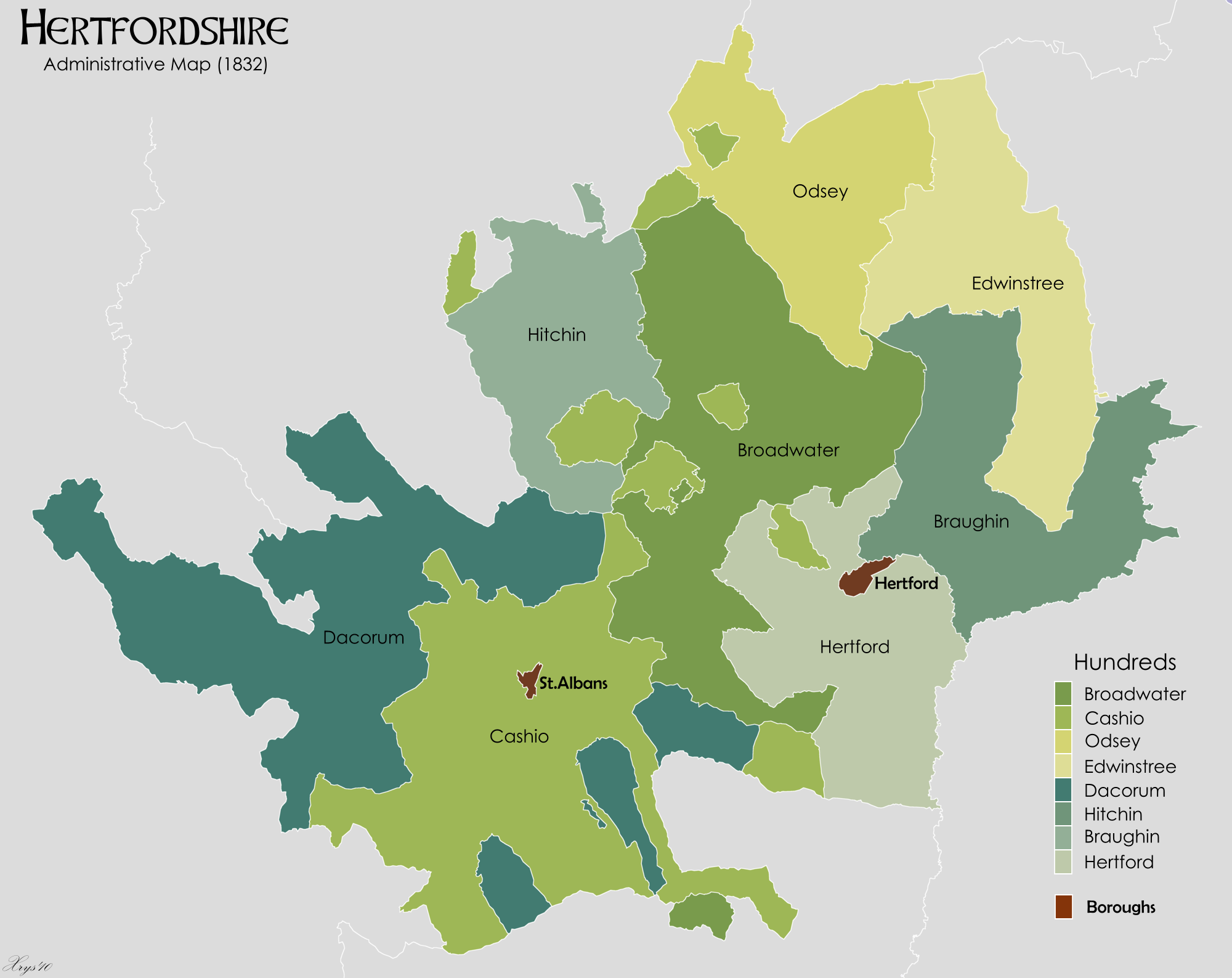
Hertfordshire hundreds in 1832

It comprised the following parishes: Hertford All Saints, Hertford St Johns, Great Amwell, Bayford, Bengeo, Little Berkhampstead, Broxbourne, Cheshunt, Essendon, Hertingfordbury, Stapleford, Tewin, and Wormley. The parish of Bramfield was originally part of the hundred but was transferred to the Liberty of St Albans in about 1260. The hundred meeting point is not known, but the sheriff's tourn was held at Ware Bridge in the 14th century.

The hundred was owned by the King and farmed jointly with Braughing by a single bailiff. In 1571 it was granted to William Cecil Lord Burghley.

Haslam proposes that the hundred was originally part of a larger "proto-hundred" which comprised the five East Hertfordshire hundreds of Braughing, Edwinstree, Odsey, Broadwater and Hertford; this territory was originally created to support the two Burhs at Hertford, on opposite banks of the River Lea, built by King Edward the Elder in 913 to defend against the Danes. The interlocking nature of Braughing and Edwinstree hundreds is taken as evidence that they were originally part of a single unit that was later subdivided into hundreds.
