= Thomas Dimsdale =

British physician, politician, and banker

Baron Thomas Dimsdale FRS
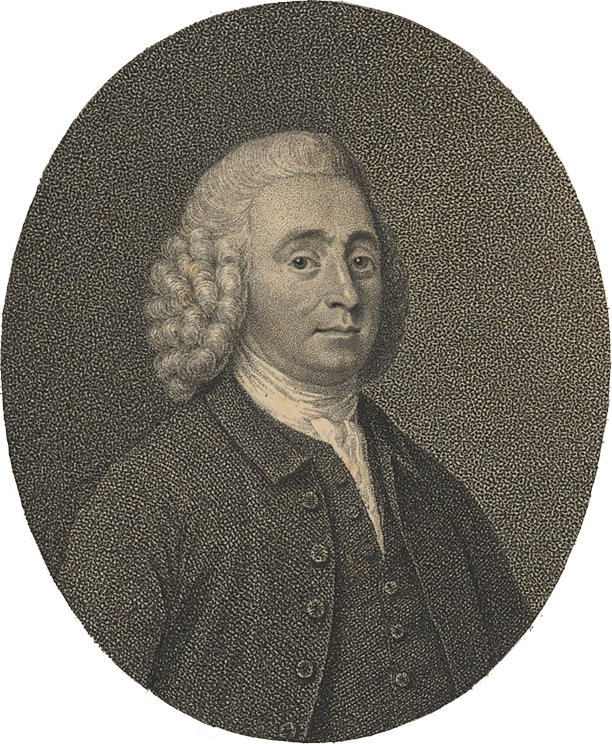
- Born: 29 May 1712; Theydon Garnon
- Died: 30 December 1800 (aged 88)
- Occupations: Doctor, banker, politician.
- Notable work: The present method of inoculating for the small-pox

Baron Thomas Dimsdale FRS (29 May 1712 – 30 December 1800) was an English medical doctor, banker and politician who sat in the House of Commons from 1780 to 1790. He was created Baron Dimsdale of the Russian Empire by Catherine the Great after inoculating her against smallpox. His cousin, housekeeper and third wife Elizabeth Dimsdale was a diarist and recipe collector.

== Early life ==
He was born in Theydon Garnon, Essex, the son of John Dimsdale, a surgeon, and his wife Susan. The family were Quakers. He was trained in medicine by his father before training further at St Thomas’ Hospital, London, after which he began to practise medicine in Hertford in 1734.

== Careers ==
Dimsdale developed a particular interest in the prevention of smallpox by inoculation (variolation), a deliberate infection of the patient via the skin with a mild form of the disease to give protection against more virulent strains. He published The present method of inoculating for the small-pox in 1767 which went into five editions by 1769. That year he was elected a Fellow of the Royal Society.

In 1762, perhaps due to his reputation within London society, he was invited to Russia to variolate the Empress Catherine the Great of Russia and her son, Grand Duke Paul. In 1768, Dimsdale, accompanied by his second son Nathaniel Dimsdale travelled to St Petersburg and inoculated the Empress, her son, and over 140 members of the Court. The results were a success and Catherine rewarded Dimsdale with £10,000, a pension of £500 per annum, £2000 expenses and a Barony of the Russian Empire. Nathaniel was also rewarded and he too received a Barony. In case the results had produced adverse effects, the Empress had arranged for a relay of fast horses to be available to speed the Dimsdales out of the country. During the long preparatory period before the variolations he wrote Tracts on inoculation written and published at St Petersburg in the year 1768.

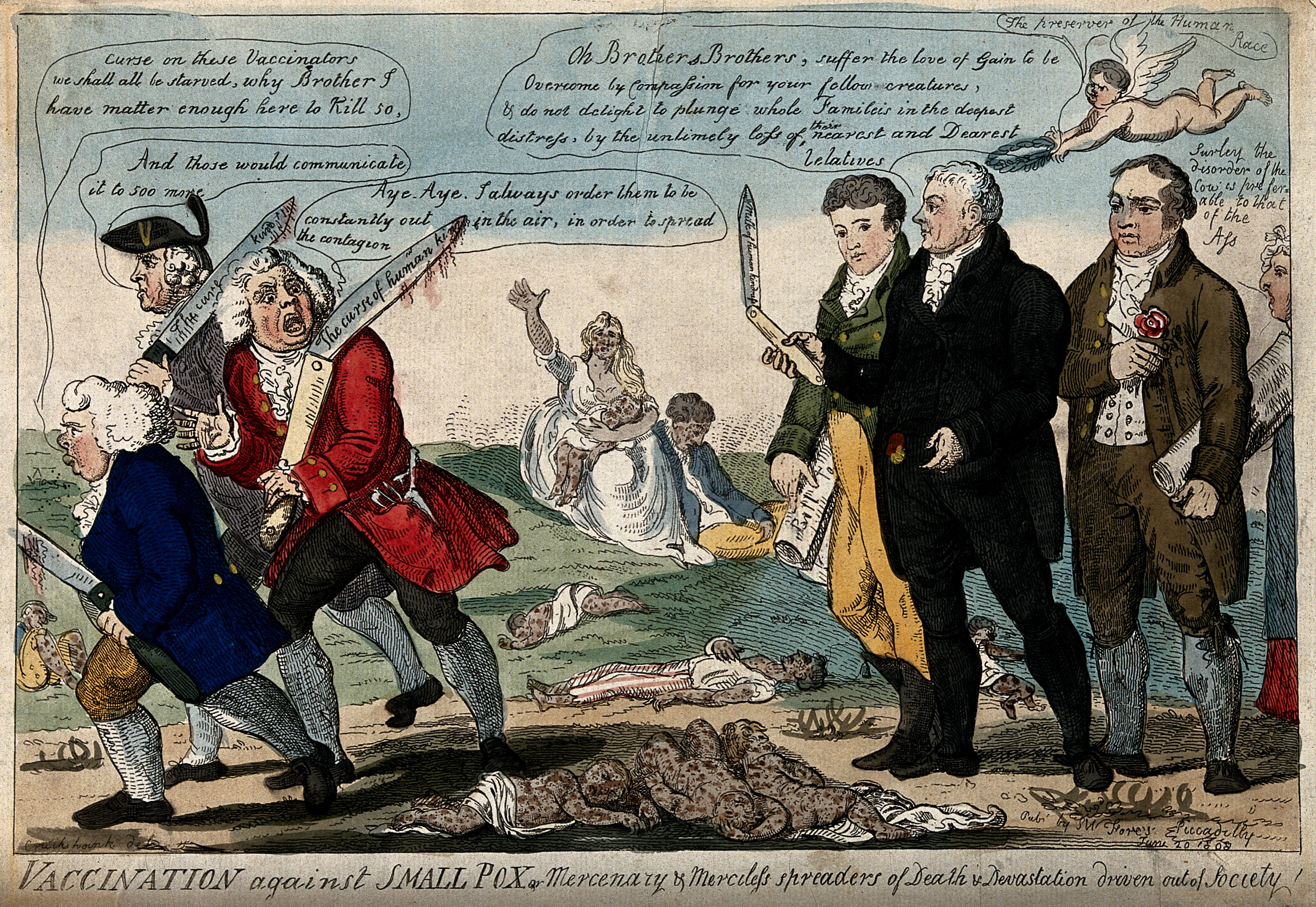
Cartoon showing Edward Jenner, Thomas Dimsdale and George Rose seeing off opponents of vaccination.

On his return from Russia, Dimsdale became a banker, initially in the private banking partnership of Dimsdale, Archer & Byde in Cornhill, London and afterwards as a partner in Staples, Baron Dimsdale, Son & Co.

Dimsdale also continued practising in medicine when he returned to England. Another famous patient of his was Mai, the first Pacific Islander to visit England. After meeting Mai, King George III suggested that he was to be inoculated for smallpox on the Royal Households expense. Mai, and his sponsor Joseph Banks arrived at Dimsdales practice and had the inoculation explained to them. Mai remarked that the gravestones from a nearby cemetery could be those of Dimsdales patients. After the procedure was complete, Mai developed the expected sores on his skin,, mouth and throat. Mai successfully recovered, and Banks wrote in a letter "Omai has now gone through all danger from inoculation [and] he fears nothing."

He was elected as MP for Hertford in two successive parliaments in 1780 and 1784. In 1781 he and Nathaniel returned to Russia to carry out further royal inoculations.

== Family ==
He had married three times: firstly Mary, the daughter of Nathaniel Brassey of Roxford, Hertfordshire; secondly Anne, the daughter of John Iles, with whom he had seven sons and two daughters; and thirdly Elizabeth Dimsdale, the daughter of his cousin Joseph Dimsdale of Bishop's Stortford. She had lived within the family for most of her life and she was a diarist and writer of letters. He was succeeded in the Russian Barony by his eldest son John, from whom it descended within the family. The Barony of John's son Nathaniel lapsed when he died with no heir.

== Death ==
He lived in Bengeo a part of Hertford, the county town of Hertfordshire, where Dimsdale Street, which partly bounded his land, still bears his name. He died in 1800 and was buried in the Quakers' burial-ground at Bishop's Stortford, Hertfordshire.

Parliament of Great Britain
Preceded by John Calvert; Paul Feilde	Member of Parliament for Hertford; 1780–1790; With: William Baker; John Calvert	Succeeded by Nathaniel, Baron Dimsdale; John Calvert
