= Hertford (constituency) =

Parliamentary constituency in the United Kingdom, 1801–1974

- Former county constituency for the House of Commons
- County: Hertfordshire
- Major settlements: Hertford

1885–1974
- Seats: One
- Created from: Hertfordshire, Hertford (Borough)
- Replaced by: Welwyn Hatfield (Majority); Hertford and Stevenage (Part)
- During its existence contributed to new seat(s) of: East Hertfordshire (1955)

Hertford (Borough)
- Former borough constituency for the House of Commons
- County: Hertfordshire
- Major settlements: Hertford

1298–1885
- Seats: Two (1298-1868), One (1868-1885)
- Replaced by: Hertford (County)

Hertford was the name of a parliamentary constituency in Hertfordshire, which elected Members of Parliament (MPs) from 1298 until 1974.

== History ==
The Parliamentary Borough of Hertford was represented by two MPs in the House of Commons of England from 1298 to 1707, then in the House of Commons of Great Britain from 1707 to 1800, and finally in the House of Commons of the Parliament of the United Kingdom from 1801 onwards. Under the Boundary Act 1868 (31 & 32 Vict. c. 46), its representation was reduced to one MP.

The Redistribution of Seats Act 1885 (which followed on from the Representation of the People Act 1884) abolished the parliamentary borough and it gave its name to one of four divisions of the abolished three-member Parliamentary County of Hertfordshire, and was formally named as the Eastern or Hertford Division of Hertfordshire.

As well as the Borough of Hertford, the enlarged constituency included the towns of Ware, Bishop's Stortford and Hoddesdon. It remained largely unchanged until 1955, but was radically altered for the 1955 general election. It was abolished in 1974.

== Boundaries and boundary changes ==
=== 1885–1918 ===
- The Borough of Hertford;
- The Sessional Divisions of Bishop's Stortford and Cheshunt;
- Parts of the Sessional Divisions of Hertford and Ware; and
- In the Sessional Division of Aldbury, the parishes of Great Hadham and Little Hadham.

=== 1918–1950 ===
- The Borough of Hertford;
- The Urban Districts of Bishop's Stortford, Cheshunt, Hoddesdon, Sawbridgeworth, and Ware;
- The Rural Districts of Hadham and Ware; and
- The Rural District of Hertford parishes of Bayford, Bengeo Rural, Bengeo Urban, Bramfield, Brickendon Liberty, Brickendon Rural, Hertingfordbury, Little Amwell, Little Berkhamsted, St Andrew Rural, St John Rural, Stapleford, and Tewin.

Minor changes to boundaries.

=== 1950–1955 ===
- The Borough of Hertford;
- The Urban Districts of Bishop's Stortford, Cheshunt, Hoddesdon, Sawbridgeworth, and Ware;
- The Rural District of Ware;
- The Rural District of Braughing parishes of Albury, Braughing, Brent Pelham, Furneux Pelham, High Wych, Little Hadham, Much Hadham, Stocking Pelham, and Thorley; and
- The Rural District of Hertford parishes of Bayford, Bengeo Rural, Bengeo Urban, Bramfield, Brickendon Liberty, Brickendon Rural, Hertingfordbury, Little Amwell, Little Berkhamsted, St Andrew Rural, St John Rural, Stapleford, and Tewin.

Nominal changes only to reflect restructuring of rural districts.

=== 1955–1974 ===
- The Borough of Hertford;
- The Urban District of Welwyn Garden City; and
- The Rural Districts of Hatfield, Hertford, and Welwyn.

Significant changes with only the Municipal Borough and the part of the Rural District of Hertford retained. The remainder of the constituency formed the basis of the new County Constituency of East Hertfordshire. The Urban District of Welwyn Garden City and the Rural District of Welwyn were transferred from St Albans; the Rural District of Hatfield from Barnet; and the remainder of the Rural District of Hertford from Hitchin.

The constituency was abolished in the redistribution taking effect for the February 1974 general election. The Municipal Borough and Rural District of Hertford were included in the new constituency of Hertford and Stevenage, with remaining areas forming the new constituency of Welwyn and Hatfield.

== Members of Parliament ==
=== Hertford borough (1298–1885) ===
==== 1298–1640 ====
Parliament	First member	Second member
1376	Constituency franchise lapsed	
1624	Constituency re-enfranchised by Parliament	
1624	William Ashton	Thomas Fanshawe
1625	William Ashton	Thomas Fanshawe
1626	Sir William Harrington	Sir Capell Bedell
1628	Sir Edward Howard ennobled and replaced by Sir Charles Morrison	Sir Thomas Fanshawe
1629	John Carey, Viscount Rochford	Sir Thomas Fanshawe
1629–1640	No Parliaments summoned	

==== 1640–1868 ====
Year	First member	First party	Second member	Second party
April 1640	Viscount Cranborne	Parliamentarian	Sir Thomas Fanshawe	Royalist
November 1640	Viscount Cranborne	Parliamentarian	Sir Thomas Fanshawe	Royalist
November 1643	Viscount Cranborne	Parliamentarian	Fanshawe disabled from sitting - seat vacant	
1645	Viscount Cranborne	Parliamentarian	William Leman	
December 1648	Cranborne not recorded as sitting after Pride's Purge		William Leman	
1653	Hertford was unrepresented in the Barebones Parliament			
1654	Isaac Pulter		Hertford had only one seat in the First and Second Parliaments of the Protectorate	
1656	Isaac Pulter		Hertford had only one seat in the First and Second Parliaments of the Protectorate	
January 1659	Isaac Pulter		James Cowper	
May 1659	Not represented in the restored Rump			
April 1660	Arthur Sparke		James Cowper	
1661	Sir Edward Turnor		Thomas Fanshawe	
1673	Sir Thomas Byde		Thomas Fanshawe	
1675	Sir Thomas Byde		Edmund Feilde	
1677	Sir Thomas Byde		Sir John Gore	
February 1679	Sir Thomas Byde		Sir Charles Caesar	
September 1679	Sir Thomas Byde		Sir William Cowper	
1685	Sir Thomas Byde		Sir Francis Boteler	
1689	Sir Thomas Byde		Sir William Cowper	
1690	Sir William Leman		Sir William Cowper	
1695	William Cowper		Sir William Cowper	
January 1701	Charles Caesar		Thomas Filmer	
February 1701	Charles Caesar		Richard Goulston	
1705	Charles Caesar		Sir Thomas Clarke	
1708	William Monson		Sir Thomas Clarke	
1710	Charles Caesar		Richard Goulston	
1715	Sir Thomas Clarke		John Boteler	
1722	Edward Harrison		Charles Caesar	
1723	Edward Harrison		Sir Thomas Clarke	
1727	George Harrison		Sir Thomas Clarke	
1734	Nathaniel Brassey		Sir Thomas Clarke	
1741	Nathaniel Brassey		George Harrison	
1759	Nathaniel Brassey		George Cowper	
1761	John Calvert		Timothy Caswall	
1768	John Calvert		William Cowper	
1770	John Calvert		Paul Feilde	
1780	Thomas, Baron Dimsdale		William Baker	
1784	Thomas, Baron Dimsdale		John Calvert	
1790	Nathaniel, Baron Dimsdale		John Calvert	
1802	Hon. Edward Spencer Cowper	Whig	Nicolson Calvert	Whig
1817	James Gascoyne-Cecil	Tory	Nicolson Calvert	Whig
1823	Thomas Byron	Tory	Nicolson Calvert	Whig
1826	Thomas Byron	Tory	Thomas Slingsby Duncombe	Whig
1830	Henry Chetwynd-Talbot	Tory	Thomas Slingsby Duncombe	Whig
1831	John Currie	Whig	Thomas Slingsby Duncombe	Whig
1832	Henry Chetwynd-Talbot	Tory	Philip Stanhope	Tory
1832	writ suspended: both seats vacant until 1835			
1835	Hon. William Cowper	Whig	Philip Stanhope	Conservative
1852	Hon. William Cowper	Whig	Thomas Chambers	Radical
1857	Hon. William Cowper	Whig	Sir Walter Townshend-Farquhar	Conservative
1859	Hon. William Cowper	Liberal	Sir Walter Townshend-Farquhar	Conservative
1866	Hon. William Cowper	Liberal	Robert Dimsdale	Conservative
1868	Representation reduced to one MP			

==== 1868–1885 ====
Election	Member	Party
1868	Robert Dimsdale	Conservative
1874	Arthur Balfour	Conservative
1885	Constituency abolished; name transferred to county division	

=== Hertford county constituency (1885–1974) ===
Election	Member	Party	Notes
1885	Abel Smith	Conservative	Member for Hertfordshire (1854–1857, 1859–1865, 1866–1885)
1898 by-election	Evelyn Cecil	Conservative	
1900	Abel Henry Smith	Conservative	Member for Christchurch (1892–1900)
Jan 1910	Sir John Rolleston	Conservative	Member for Leicester (1900–1906)
1916 by-election	Noel Pemberton Billing	Independent	
1921 by-election	Murray Sueter	Anti-Waste League/Independent Parliamentary Group	
Oct 1922	Murray Sueter	Conservative	
1945	Derek Walker-Smith	Conservative	Contested East Hertfordshire following redistribution
Constituency split, majority renamed East Hertfordshire, minority merged with part of Barnet
1955	Robert Lindsay	Conservative	Contested Welwyn Hatfield following redistribution
Feb 1974	Constituency abolished - see Welwyn Hatfield and Hertford and Stevenage		

== Election results 1830–1885 ==
=== Elections in the 1830s ===
General election 1830: Hertford
Party	Candidate	Votes	%
Whig	Thomas Slingsby Duncombe	Unopposed	
Tory	Henry Chetwynd-Talbot	Unopposed	
Registered electors		c. 800	
Whig hold			
Tory hold			

General election 1831: Hertford
Party	Candidate	Votes	%
Whig	Thomas Slingsby Duncombe	492	37.7
Whig	John Currie (MP)	431	33.0
Tory	Henry Chetwynd-Talbot	383	29.3
Majority		48	3.7
Turnout		739	c. 92.4
Registered electors		c. 800	
Whig hold			
Whig gain from Tory			

General election 1832: Hertford
Party	Candidate	Votes	%	±%
Tory	Henry Chetwynd-Talbot	432	32.5	+17.9
Tory	Philip Stanhope	381	28.7	+14.1
Radical	Thomas Slingsby Duncombe	329	24.8	−12.9
Radical	John Eden Spalding	186	14.0	N/A
Majority		52	3.9	N/A
Turnout		671	95.9	c. +3.5
Registered electors		700		
Tory gain from Whig		Swing	+12.2	
Tory gain from Whig		Swing	+10.3	

The 1832 election was later declared void, but a new writ was not issued during the course of the parliament.

General election 1835: Hertford
Party	Candidate	Votes	%	±%
Conservative	Philip Stanhope	359	35.7	+7.0
Whig	William Cowper	327	32.5	N/A
Conservative	Henry Chetwynd-Talbot	321	31.9	−0.6
Turnout		616	97.3	+1.4
Registered electors		633		
Majority		32	3.2	−0.7
Conservative hold		Swing		
Majority		6	0.6	N/A
Whig gain from Conservative		Swing		

General election 1837: Hertford
Party	Candidate	Votes	%	±%
Whig	William Cowper	378	38.5	+6.0
Conservative	Philip Stanhope	306	31.2	−36.4
Radical	John Currie (MP)	297	30.3	N/A
Turnout		580	91.9	−5.4
Registered electors		631		
Majority		72	7.3	+6.7
Whig hold		Swing	+21.2	
Majority		9	0.9	−2.3
Conservative hold		Swing	−21.2	

Cowper was appointed as a commissioner of Greenwich Hospital, requiring a by-election.

By-election, 20 May 1839: Hertford
Party	Candidate	Votes	%	±%
Whig	William Cowper	297	51.7	+13.2
Conservative	Walter Townsend-Farquhar	278	48.3	+17.1
Majority		19	3.4	−3.9
Turnout		575	92.9	+1.0
Registered electors		619		
Whig hold		Swing	−2.0	

=== Elections in the 1840s ===
General election 1841: Hertford
Party	Candidate	Votes	%	±%
Whig	William Cowper	Unopposed		
Conservative	Philip Stanhope	Unopposed		
Registered electors		607		
Whig hold				
Conservative hold				

Cowper was appointed a Civil Lord of the Admiralty, requiring a by-election.

By-election, 11 July 1846: Hertford
Party	Candidate	Votes	%	±%
Whig	William Cowper	Unopposed		
Whig hold				

General election 1847: Hertford
Party	Candidate	Votes	%	±%
Whig	William Cowper	Unopposed		
Conservative	Philip Stanhope	Unopposed		
Registered electors		567		
Whig hold				
Conservative hold				

=== Elections in the 1850s ===
General election 1852: Hertford
Party	Candidate	Votes	%	±%
Whig	William Cowper	301	32.3	N/A
Radical	Thomas Chambers	235	25.2	N/A
Conservative	Philip Stanhope	213	22.9	N/A
Conservative	Charles Dimsdale	182	19.5	N/A
Turnout		466 (est)	68.0 (est)	N/A
Registered electors		685		
Majority		66	7.1	N/A
Whig hold		Swing	N/A	
Majority		22	2.3	N/A
Radical gain from Conservative				

Cowper was appointed Civil Lord of the Admiralty, requiring a by-election.

By-election, 1 January 1853: Hertford
Party	Candidate	Votes	%	±%
Whig	William Cowper	Unopposed		
Whig hold				

Cowper was appointed president of the General Board of Health, requiring a by-election.

By-election, 14 August 1855: Hertford
Party	Candidate	Votes	%	±%
Whig	William Cowper	Unopposed		
Whig hold				

Cowper was appointed Vice-President of the Committee of the Council on Education, requiring a by-election.

By-election, 9 February 1857: Hertford
Party	Candidate	Votes	%	±%
Whig	William Cowper	Unopposed		
Whig hold				

General election 1857: Hertford
Party	Candidate	Votes	%	±%
Whig	William Cowper	301	37.2	+4.9
Conservative	Walter Townsend-Farquhar	273	33.7	−8.7
Radical	Thomas Chambers	235	29.0	+3.8
Turnout		405 (est)	65.2 (est)	−2.8
Registered electors		620		
Majority		28	3.5	−3.6
Whig hold		Swing	+4.6	
Majority		38	4.7	N/A
Conservative gain from Radical		Swing	−6.3	

General election 1859: Hertford
Party	Candidate	Votes	%	±%
Liberal	William Cowper	Unopposed		
Conservative	Walter Townsend-Farquhar	Unopposed		
Registered electors		530		
Liberal hold				
Conservative hold				

Cowper was appointed Vice-President of the Board of Trade, requiring a by-election.

By-election, 19 August 1859: Hertford
Party	Candidate	Votes	%	±%
Liberal	William Cowper	281	57.9	N/A
Conservative	Robert Dimsdale	204	42.1	N/A
Majority		77	15.8	N/A
Turnout		485	91.5	N/A
Registered electors		530		
Liberal hold		Swing	N/A	

=== Elections in the 1860s ===
Cowper was appointed First Commissioner of Works, requiring a by-election.

By-election, 13 February 1860: Hertford
Party	Candidate	Votes	%	±%
Liberal	William Cowper	Unopposed		
Liberal hold				

General election 1865: Hertford
Party	Candidate	Votes	%	±%
Liberal	William Cowper	Unopposed		
Conservative	Walter Townshend-Farquhar	Unopposed		
Registered electors		543		
Liberal hold				
Conservative hold				

Townshend-Farquhar's death caused a by-election.

By-election, 30 June 1866: Hertford
Party	Candidate	Votes	%	±%
Conservative	Robert Dimsdale	Unopposed		
Conservative hold				

Seat reduced to one member

General election 1868: Hertford
Party	Candidate	Votes	%	±%
Conservative	Robert Dimsdale	434	55.7	N/A
Liberal	Frederick Waymouth Gibbs	345	44.3	N/A
Majority		89	11.4	N/A
Turnout		779	84.5	N/A
Registered electors		922		
Conservative hold				

=== Elections in the 1870s ===
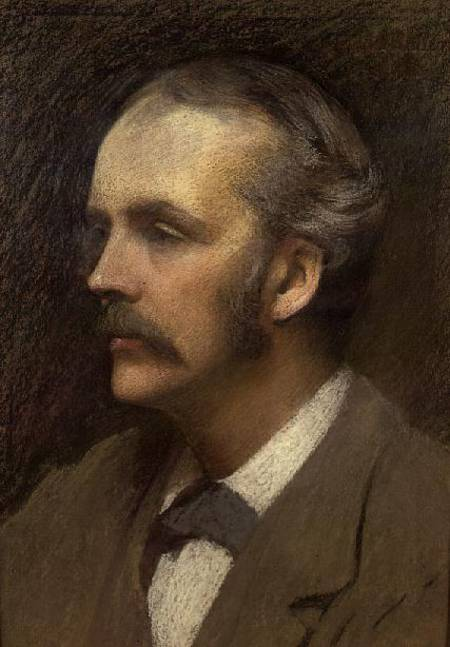
Arthur Balfour was MP for Hertford between 1874 and 1885, and later Prime Minister.

General election 1874: Hertford
Party	Candidate	Votes	%	±%
Conservative	Arthur Balfour	Unopposed		
Registered electors		1,041		
Conservative hold				

=== Elections in the 1880s ===
General election 1880: Hertford
Party	Candidate	Votes	%	±%
Conservative	Arthur Balfour	564	58.5	N/A
Liberal	Edward Ernest Bowen	400	41.5	New
Majority		164	17.0	N/A
Turnout		964	89.2	N/A
Registered electors		1,081		
Conservative hold		Swing	N/A	

Balfour was appointed President of the Local Government Board, requiring a by-election.

By-election, 30 Jun 1885: Hertford
Party	Candidate	Votes	%	±%
Conservative	Arthur Balfour	Unopposed		
Conservative hold				

== Election results 1885–1950 ==
=== Elections in the 1880s ===
Smith

General election 1885: Hertford
Party	Candidate	Votes	%	±%
Conservative	Abel Smith	4,263	58.1	−0.4
Liberal	Henry Cowper	3,072	41.9	+0.4
Majority		1,191	16.2	−0.8
Turnout		7,335	83.0	−6.2
Registered electors		8,840		
Conservative hold		Swing	−0.4	

General election 1886: Hertford
Party	Candidate	Votes	%	±%
Conservative	Abel Smith	Unopposed		
Conservative hold				

=== Elections in the 1890s ===
General election 1892: Hertford
Party	Candidate	Votes	%	±%
Conservative	Abel Smith	4,276	60.3	N/A
Liberal	Edwin Robert Speirs	2,818	39.7	New
Majority		1,458	20.6	N/A
Turnout		7,094	75.8	N/A
Registered electors		9,355		
Conservative hold		Swing	N/A	

General election 1895: Hertford
Party	Candidate	Votes	%	±%
Conservative	Abel Smith	Unopposed		
Conservative hold				

Smith's death caused a by-election.

Spencer

1898 Hertford by-election
Party	Candidate	Votes	%	±%
Conservative	Evelyn Cecil	4,118	51.7	N/A
Liberal	Charles Spencer	3,850	48.3	New
Majority		268	3.4	N/A
Turnout		7,968	77.4	N/A
Registered electors		10,301		
Conservative hold		Swing	N/A	

=== Elections in the 1900s ===
Smith

General election 1900: Hertford
Party	Candidate	Votes	%	±%
Conservative	Abel Henry Smith	Unopposed		
Conservative hold				

Buxton

General election 1906: Hertford
Party	Candidate	Votes	%	±%
Conservative	Abel Henry Smith	4,836	50.4	N/A
Liberal	Charles Buxton	4,756	49.6	New
Majority		80	0.8	N/A
Turnout		9,592	86.2	N/A
Registered electors		11,124		
Conservative hold		Swing	N/A	

=== Elections in the 1910s ===
General election January 1910: Hertford
Party	Candidate	Votes	%	±%
Conservative	John Rolleston	6,147	58.0	+7.6
Liberal	Edmund Broughton Barnard	4,455	42.0	−7.6
Majority		1,692	16.0	+15.2
Turnout		10,602	89.6	+3.4
Registered electors		11,838		
Conservative hold		Swing	+7.6	

General election December 1910: Hertford
Party	Candidate	Votes	%	±%
Conservative	John Rolleston	5,594	57.0	−1.0
Liberal	George Strachan Pawle	4,226	43.0	+1.0
Majority		1,368	14.0	−2.0
Turnout		9,820	83.0	−6.6
Registered electors		12,684		
Conservative hold		Swing	−1.0	

General Election 1914–15:

Another General Election was required to take place before the end of 1915. The political parties had been making preparations for an election to take place and by July 1914, the following candidates had been selected;

- Unionist: John Rolleston
- Liberal:
- Independent: W. H. Rolfe

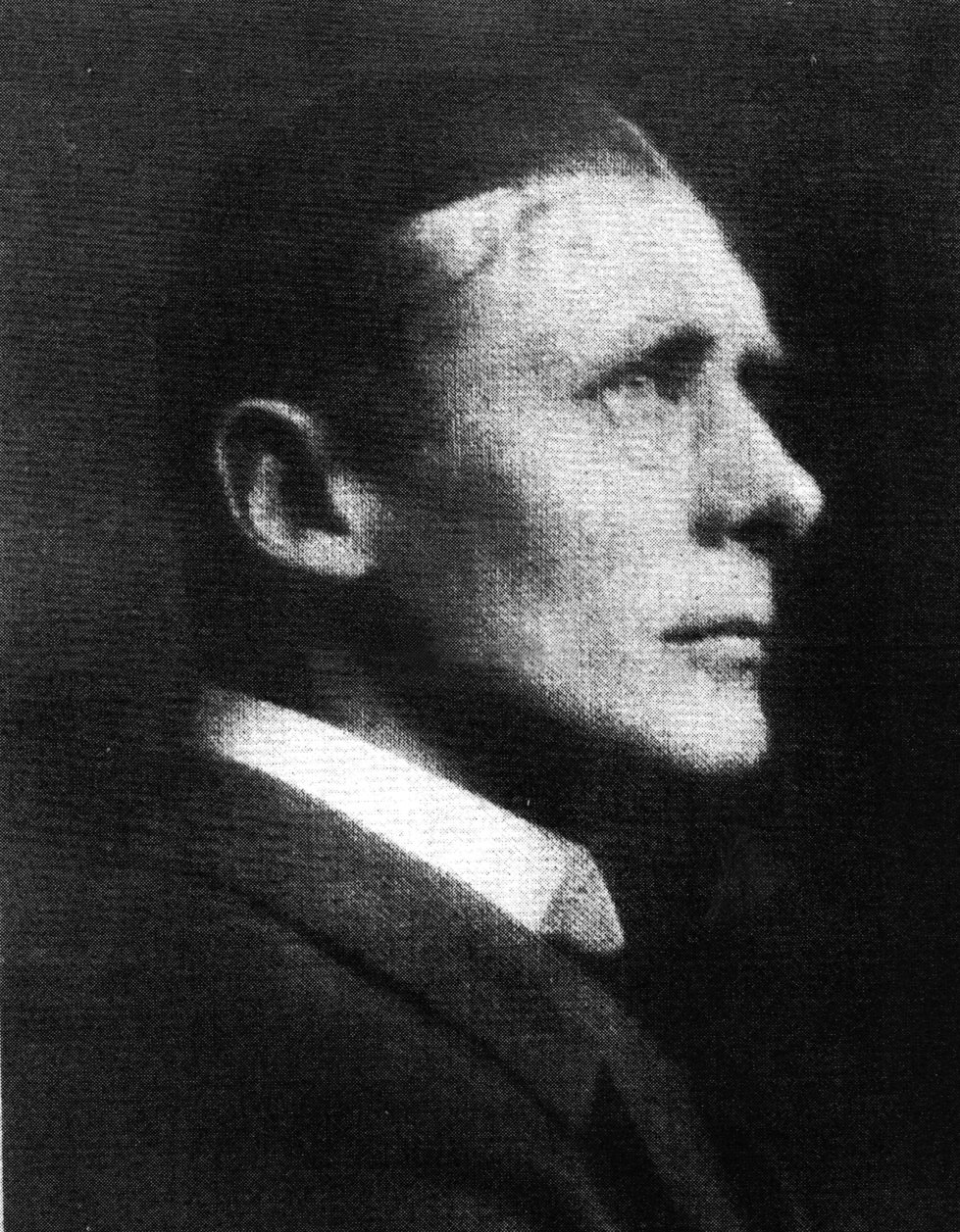
Billing

1916 Hertford by-election
Party	Candidate	Votes	%	±%
Independent	Noel Pemberton Billing	4,590	56.3	New
Unionist	Brodie Henderson	3,559	43.7	−13.3
Majority		1,031	12.6	N/A
Turnout		8,149	64.2	−18.8
Registered electors		12,684		
Independent gain from Unionist		Swing		

General election 1918: Hertford
Party	Candidate	Votes	%	±%
Independent	Noel Pemberton Billing	9,628	52.1	N/A
National	*Edmund Broughton Barnard	7,158	38.8	−18.2
Labour	Cyril Harding	1,679	9.1	New
Majority		2,470	13.3	N/A
Turnout		18,465	57.4	−25.6
Registered electors		32,158		
Independent hold		Swing		

* Barnard was also the nominee of the National Farmers' Union

=== Elections in the 1920s ===
1921 Hertford by-election
Party	Candidate	Votes	%	±%
Anti-Waste League (Ind. Parliamentary Group)	Murray Sueter	12,329	68.9	New
Unionist	Hildred Carlile	5,553	31.1	New
Majority		6,776	37.8	N/A
Turnout		17,882	55.1	−2.3
Registered electors		32,426		
Anti-Waste League gain from Independent		Swing		

General election 1922: Hertford
Party	Candidate	Votes	%	±%
Unionist	Murray Sueter	11,406	63.6	N/A
Liberal	Thomas Greenwood	6,534	36.4	New
Majority		4,872	27.2	N/A
Turnout		17,940	54.1	−3.3
Registered electors		33,184		
Unionist gain from Independent		Swing		

General election 1923: Hertford
Party	Candidate	Votes	%	±%
Unionist	Murray Sueter	10,660	52.2	−11.4
Liberal	Thomas Greenwood	9,763	47.8	+11.4
Majority		897	4.4	−22.8
Turnout		20,423	60.6	+6.5
Registered electors		33,704		
Unionist hold		Swing	−11.4	

General election 1924: Hertford
Party	Candidate	Votes	%	±%
Unionist	Murray Sueter	14,582	60.0	+7.8
Liberal	Thomas Morris Davies	5,828	24.0	−23.8
Labour	Ernest Selley	3,885	16.0	New
Majority		8,754	36.0	+31.6
Turnout		24,295	70.8	+10.2
Registered electors		34,315		
Unionist hold		Swing	+15.8	

General election 1929: Hertford
Party	Candidate	Votes	%	±%
Unionist	Murray Sueter	13,525	39.5	−20.5
Independent	Noel Pemberton Billing	10,149	29.6	New
Liberal	Thomas Evander Evans	6,419	18.7	−5.3
Labour	Roger S Edwards	4,193	12.2	−3.8
Majority		3,376	9.9	−26.1
Turnout		34,286	74.7	+3.9
Registered electors		45,893		
Unionist hold		Swing	−7.6	

=== Elections in the 1930s ===
General election 1931: Hertford
Party	Candidate	Votes	%	±%
Conservative	Murray Sueter	25,751	78.4	+38.9
Labour	Roger S Edwards	7,092	21.6	+9.4
Majority		18,659	56.8	+46.9
Turnout		32,843	69.1	−5.6
Conservative hold		Swing	+14.7	

General election 1935: Hertford
Party	Candidate	Votes	%	±%
Conservative	Murray Sueter	21,193	64.8	−13.6
Labour	Roger S Edwards	11,492	35.2	+13.6
Majority		9,701	29.6	−27.2
Turnout		32,685	62.5	−6.6
Conservative hold		Swing	−11.7	

=== Elections in the 1940s ===
General Election 1939–40: Another General Election was required to take place before the end of 1940. The political parties had been making preparations for an election to take place from 1939 and by the end of this year, the following candidates had been selected;

- Conservative: Murray Sueter
- Labour: Mitchell W. Gordon

General election 1945: Hertford
Party	Candidate	Votes	%	±%
Conservative	Derek Walker-Smith	19,877	43.3	−21.5
Labour	Lynton Scutts	17,349	37.9	+2.7
Liberal	Thomas Peter Hughes	7,587	16.6	new
Independent	Arthur Bernard Swain	1,005	2.2	new
Majority		2,528	5.4	−24.2
Turnout		45,818	70.4	+7.9
Conservative hold		Swing	−12.1	

=== Elections in the 1950s ===
General election 1950: Hertford
Party	Candidate	Votes	%	±%
Conservative	Derek Walker-Smith	25,074	45.90	+2.60
Labour	Lynton Scutts	19,324	35.37	−2.53
Liberal	Thomas Peter Hughes	10,234	18.73	+2.13
Majority		5,750	10.53	+5.13
Turnout		54,632	83.18	+12.78
Registered electors		65,683		
Conservative hold		Swing	+2.57	

General election 1951: Hertford
Party	Candidate	Votes	%	±%
Conservative	Derek Walker-Smith	30,519	56.28	+10.38
Labour Co-op	Richard Marsh	23,708	43.72	+8.35
Majority		6,811	12.56	+2.03
Turnout		54,227	80.80	−2.38
Registered electors		67,110		
Conservative hold		Swing	+1.02	

== Election results 1955–1974 ==
=== Elections in the 1950s ===
General election 1955: Hertford
Party	Candidate	Votes	%
Conservative	Robert Lindsay	25,014	56.79
Labour	John McKnight	19,030	43.21
Majority		5,984	13.58
Turnout		44,044	82.24
Registered electors		53,556	
Conservative win (new boundaries)			

General election 1959: Hertford
Party	Candidate	Votes	%	±%
Conservative	Robert Lindsay	31,418	58.17	+1.38
Labour	Gerald D Southgate	22,597	41.83	−1.38
Majority		8,821	16.34	+2.76
Turnout		54,015	84.26	+2.02
Registered electors		64,106		
Conservative hold		Swing	+1.38	

=== Elections in the 1960s ===
General election 1964: Hertford
Party	Candidate	Votes	%	±%
Conservative	Robert Lindsay	29,134	46.23	−11.94
Labour	Thomas A Deacon	25,161	39.93	−1.90
Liberal	Anna Harman	8,722	13.84	New
Majority		3,973	6.30	−10.04
Turnout		63,017	84.64	+0.38
Registered electors		74,450		
Conservative hold		Swing	−5.02	

General election 1966: Hertford
Party	Candidate	Votes	%	±%
Conservative	Robert Lindsay	32,302	50.62	+3.79
Labour	Peter Nurse	31,508	49.38	+9.45
Majority		794	1.24	−5.06
Turnout		63,810	83.70	−0.94
Registered electors		76,234		
Conservative hold		Swing	−2.83	

=== Elections in the 1970s ===
General election 1970: Hertford
Party	Candidate	Votes	%	±%
Conservative	Robert Lindsay	36,494	52.58	+1.96
Labour	Yvonne Sieve	26,924	38.79	−10.59
Liberal	John Melling	5,994	8.64	New
Majority		9,570	13.79	+12.55
Turnout		69,412	78.08	−5.62
Registered electors		88,900		
Conservative hold		Swing	+6.28	
