= Sir Walter Townsend-Farquhar, 2nd Baronet =

Politician (1809–1866)

Walter Townshend-Farquhar MP

Member of Parliament for Hertford
- In office 27 March 1857 – 18 June 1866 Serving with William Cowper
- Preceded by: William Cowper; Thomas Chambers
- Succeeded by: William Cowper; Robert Dimsdale

Personal details
- Born: Walter Minto Townsend-Farquhar; 26 October 1809
- Died: 18 June 1866 (aged 56)
- Party: Conservative
- Spouse: Erica Catherine Mackay (m. 1835)
- Children: 5
- Parent(s): Robert Townsend Farquhar; Maria Frances Geslip de Latour

Sir Walter Minto Townsend-Farquhar, 2nd Baronet (26 October 1809 – 18 June 1866), also spelt Townshend-Farquhar, was a British Conservative Party politician.

== Early life ==
He was the son of Robert Townsend Farquhar and Maria Frances Geslip de Latour.

== Career ==
He became Baronet of Mauritius upon his father's death in 1830.

Townsend-Farquhar was elected MP for Hertford in 1857 and held the seat until his death in 1866.

== Personal life ==
In 1835, he married Erica Catherine Mackay, daughter of Eric Mackay, 7th Lord Reay, and together they had five children, four of whom succeeded to his baronetcy and one, the youngest, who was elevated to an earldom:

- Eric Townsend-Farquhar (1836–1867)
- Minto Townsend-Farquhar (1837–1872)
- John Townsend-Farquhar (1839–1877)
- Robert Townsend-Farquhar (1841–1924)
- Horace Farquhar (1844–1923)

Sir Walter died on 18 June 1866 and was succeeded in the baronetcy by his eldest son, Eric.

Parliament of the United Kingdom
Preceded by William Cowper; Thomas Chambers	Member of Parliament for Hertford; 1857–1866; With: William Cowper	Succeeded by William Cowper; Robert Dimsdale
Baronetage of the United Kingdom
Preceded by Robert Townsend Farquhar	Baronet (of Mauritius); 1830–1866	Succeeded by Eric Townsend-Farquhar
