= Tonwell =

Village in Hertfordshire, England

Coordinates: 51.8379°N 0.0644°W

- Location within Hertfordshire
- Population: 296 (2001)
- OS grid reference: TL334172
- District: East Hertfordshire
- Shire county: Hertfordshire
- Region: East
- Country: England
- Sovereign state: United Kingdom
- Post town: Ware
- Postcode district: SG12
- Dialling code: 01920
- Police: Hertfordshire
- Fire: Hertfordshire
- Ambulance: East of England
- UK Parliament: North East Hertfordshire

Tonwell is a small village in Bengeo Rural parish, Hertfordshire.

The village is situated just off the A602 (formerly B1001), having been bypassed in 1987 - making the A10 and therefore London and Cambridge easily accessible by road.

Tonwell has a population of about 300 persons, being included at the 2011 Census in the civil parish of Bengeo Rural. The demographic is similar to that of Hertfordshire itself, with a number of family properties as well as those more suited to elderly people. Near the village are Paynes Hall (south of the village by half a mile, where the A602 crosses the River Rib); Bengeo Temple farm; and the parkland at Sacombe (listed in the landscape character assessment as a rare and significant example of Victorian parkland.)

Tonwell has close ties to the neighbouring hamlet of Chapmore End; the only other settlement in the parish. The two settlements have held combined events such as the village fete, and events in the village hall in Tonwell.

Village amenities include a school (built in 1858), village hall, and the Robin Hood and Little John (free house) pub.

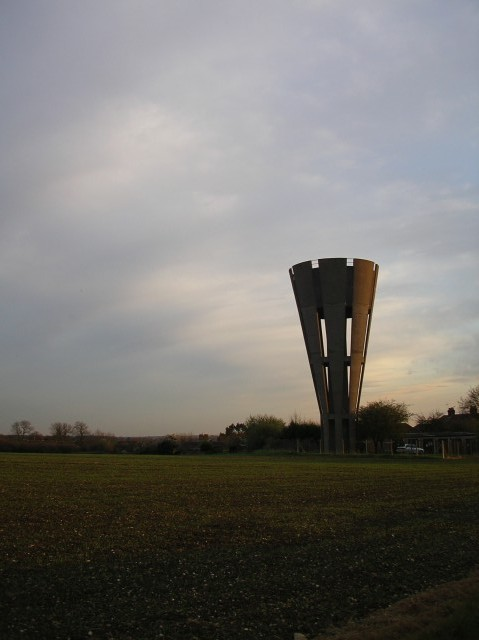
Tonwell Water Tower

The village shop and post office was closed by the owners in the 1980s and converted into a restaurant, now been converted into a self contained 1 bed flat and no longer a restaurant.. The nearest food stores or post office are situated in Hertford, Watton-at-Stone or Ware, some two to three miles away. There are footpaths from the village but in view of the distance, residents generally have to use their own cars, a taxi or the very infrequent 384 bus service.

The Church of St Mary's in Tonwell [CoE] adjoins the village school, and contains a Norman era font (relocated from St Nicholas' church in Hertford in about 1700). The church also contains wood panelling from the Houses of Parliament, which was installed in the church after the Second World War following bomb damage. In the 1990s, the church fell into disrepair, and eventually in the 2000s services were suspended. In 2005 the church was officially closed and renovated with the village school being extended into the church to cope with rising pupil numbers.

== Tonwell Water Tower ==
The skyline of the village is dominated by the futuristic 1960s concrete water tower. In 2007 it was listed at Grade II. The water tower has a capacity of 50,000 gallons and was built in 1964. It was designed by Edmund C. Percey of Scherrer and Hicks. It is now disused and has been converted for residential use.
