= John Calvert (1726–1804) =

British politician (1726–1804)

- Born: 6 May 1726
- Died: 22 February 1804 (aged 77)
- Occupations: Brewer, politician
- Known for: Sat in the House of Commons for 48 years

John Calvert (6 May 1726 – 22 February 1804) was an English brewer and politician who sat in the House of Commons for 48 years between 1754 and 1802.

Calvert was born on 6 May 1726 the son of Felix Calvert of Albury Hall and his wife Mary Calvert daughter of Felix Calvert of Nine Ashes, Hertfordshire who was his second cousin. The Calvert family were London brewers who owned the Peacock Brewhouse in Whitecross Street and the Hour Glass brewhouse in Thames Street.

Calvert was returned as Member of Parliament for Wendover by Lord Verney in a by-election on 25 February 1754 and was re-elected in the 1754 general election. His father died on 29 April 1755 and he inherited a partnership in the family business at the Peacock Brewery, Whitecross Street which he ran successfully for many years.

In 1761 Calvert was returned unopposed as MP for Hertford and again in 1774. He then lost his seat at Hertford in the 1780 general election but was returned by Lord Weymouth as MP for Tamworth in a by-election of November 1780. In 1784 he was returned again at Hertford. He was elected there again in 1790 and headed the poll in 1796. He retired at the 1802 general election

Calvert died on 22 February 1804. He had married Elizabeth Hulse, daughter of Sir Edward Hulse, 1st Baronet on 8 September 1757 and had two sons. He was succeeded by his son John.

Parliament of Great Britain
Preceded by The Earl Verney; John Hampden	Member of Parliament for Wendover; 1754–1761; With: The Earl Verney	Succeeded by Richard Chandler-Cavendish; Verney Lovett
Preceded by Nathaniel Brassey; Viscount Fordwich	Member of Parliament for Hertford; 1761–1780; With: Timothy Caswall 1761-1768; William Cowper 1768-1770; Paul Feilde 1770-1780	Succeeded by Thomas, Baron Dimsdale; William Baker
Preceded by John Courtenay; Anthony Chamier	Member of Parliament for Tamworth; 1780–1784; With: John Courtenay	Succeeded by John Courtenay; John Calvert II
Preceded by Thomas, Baron Dimsdale; William Baker	Member of Parliament for Hertford; 1784–1802; With: Thomas, Baron Dimsdale 1784-1790	Succeeded by Hon. Edward Spencer Cowper; Nicolson Calvert
