= Arthur Sparke =

Member of the Parliament of England

Member of Parliament for Hertford
- In office 4 April 1660 – 25 March 1661
- Succeeded by: Sir Edward Turnor

Personal details
- Born: 5 June 1628
- Died: 1677 (aged 48–49)
- Spouse: Mary North
- Children: ~2

Arthur Sparke (5 June 1628 – 1677) was an English lawyer and politician who sat in the House of Commons in 1660.

== Life and work ==
=== Birth ===
Arthur was born on 5 June 1628, as the fifth (but third surviving) son of Thomas Sparke, who was the rector of Brown Candover parish.

=== Positions ===
Sparke was a barrister at the Middle Temple, from 1651 to 1655. He served as the Town clerk in Hertford and was also steward of the borough court from 1661 until 1675. In 1660, he was elected as a member of parliament for Hertford in the Convention Parliament. Additionally, he was deputy to the King's Remembrancer in the Exchequer and served as a justice of the peace for Hertfordshire.

=== Family ===
Sparke married Mary North, the daughter of Hugh North of Marden in the parish of Tewin. Together, they had at least two sons, the second of whom (Arthur Sparke) was born on 1 March 1661 but died on 12 January 1665 and was buried in the Church of St Mary the Virgin in Baldock.

=== Death ===
He died at the age of 49 in 1677.
