= Edmund Feilde =

Edmund Feilde (also Field) (1620–1676) was an English barrister and politician.

== Life ==
He was the son of Thomas Feilde, rector of St Andrew's, Hertford. He matriculated at Emmanuel College, Cambridge in 1637; and entered the Inner Temple in 1639. He was called to the bar in 1652.

Feilde entered Parliament by defeating Sir John Gore at a by-election for Hertford in 1675, with the support of Sir Thomas Byde who was the other MP. He was not in Parliament long enough to make an impact, or indeed to speak. He purchased Stanstead Abbots in this last year of his life.

== Family ==
Feilde married, around 1653, Frances, daughter of William Pert of Mountnessing, Essex. She was the widow of Charles Nodes, his cousin. They had two sons, and one daughter, who married the son of Sir Thomas Byde.
