= Colebrooke =

Colebrooke, Devon is a village and parish in the county of Devon, England.

Colebrooke may also refer to:

== People ==
- Baron Colebrooke, a title in the Peerage of the United Kingdom
- Henry Thomas Colebrooke (1765–1837), English orientalist and mathematician
- James Colebrooke (banker) (1680–1752), English banker
  - Robert Colebrooke (1718–1785), his son, English MP
    - Robert Hyde Colebrooke (c. 1762–1808), son of Robert, British infantry officer in India
  - James Colebrooke (1722–1761), his next son, English MP, 1st Baronet Colebrooke
  - George Colebrooke (1729–1809), his last son, English speculator, 2nd Baronet Colebrooke, father of Henry Thomas Colebrooke
- William MacBean George Colebrooke (1787–1870), British soldier and colonial administrator, lieutenant governor of New Brunswick
- Sir Charles James Colebrooke Little (1882–1973), Admiral of the Royal Navy
- James Colebrooke Patterson (1839–1929), Canadian politician

== Places ==
- Colebrooke Island, Andaman Islands
- Colebrooke River, Northern Ireland

== See also ==
- Coalbrook (disambiguation)
- Colebrook (disambiguation)
- Colnbrook, a village near Slough, England
