= Thomas Brand =

Thomas Brand may refer to:

- Thomas Brand (minister) (1635–1691), English nonconformist
- Thomas Brand (senior) (c. 1717–1770), British Member of Parliament for Gatton, New Shoreham, Okehampton and Tavistock
- Thomas Brand Hollis (1719–1804), British radical and dissenter
- Thomas Brand (junior) (1749–1794), British Member of Parliament for Arundel
- Thomas Brand, 20th Baron Dacre (1774–1851), British Whig politician
- Thomas Brand, 3rd Viscount Hampden (1869–1958), British peer
- Thomas Brand, 4th Viscount Hampden (1900–1965), British peer
- Thomas Brand, producer of Crazy People
