= Charles Bennet, 5th Earl of Tankerville =

British politician

The Right Honourable The Earl of Tankerville DL PC MP

Treasurer of the Household
- In office 1806–1807
- Monarch: George III
- Prime Minister: The Lord Grenville
- Preceded by: Viscount Stopford
- Succeeded by: Viscount Stopford

Member of Parliament for Steyning
- In office 1803–1806

Member of Parliament for Knaresborough
- In office 1806–1818

Member of Parliament for Berwick-upon-Tweed
- In office 1820–1822

Personal details
- Born: 28 April 1776
- Died: 25 June 1859 (aged 83) 23 Hertford Street, Mayfair
- Spouse: Sophie Léonie de Gramont (d. 1865)
- Children: 2, including Charles
- Education: Trinity College, Cambridge

Charles Augustus Bennet, 5th Earl of Tankerville PC DL MP (28 April 1776 – 25 June 1859), styled Lord Ossulston until 1822, was a British politician. He served as Treasurer of the Household from 1806 to 1807 in the Ministry of All the Talents.

== Background and education ==
Lord Ossulston was the eldest son of Charles Bennet, 4th Earl of Tankerville, by his wife Emma Colebrooke, daughter of Sir James Colebrooke, 1st Baronet. Henry Grey Bennet was his younger brother. He was educated at Eton and Trinity College, Cambridge.

== Political career ==
Lord Ossulston sat as Member of Parliament for Steyning from 1803 to 1806, for Knaresborough from 1806 to 1818 and for Berwick from 1820 to 1822. He served as Treasurer of the Household from 1806 to 1807 in the Ministry of All the Talents headed by Lord Grenville. He was sworn of the Privy Council in 1806. In 1822 he succeeded his father in the earldom and took his seat in the House of Lords.

== Family ==
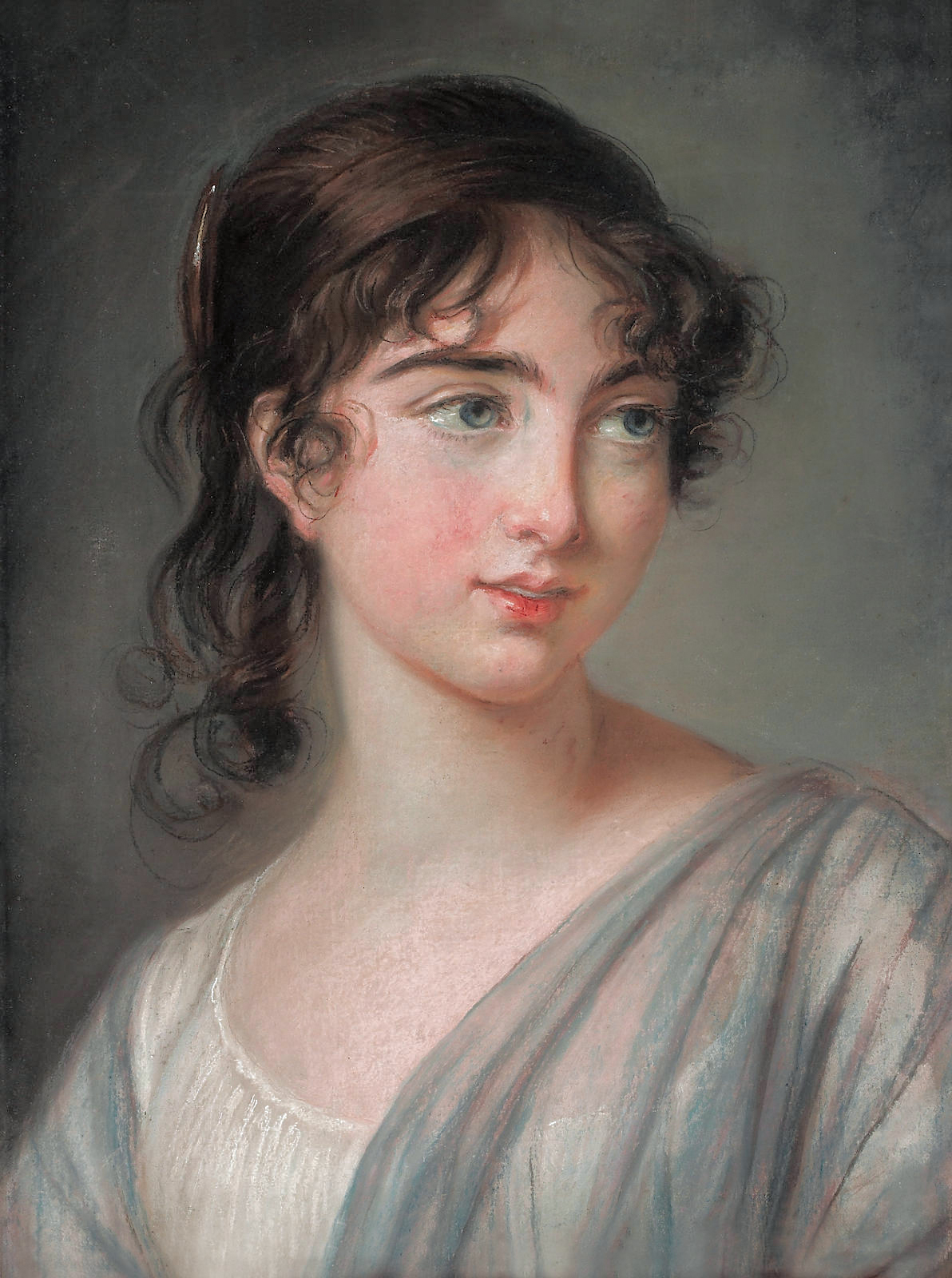
Sophie Léonie (Corisande) de Gramont (Elisabeth Vigée Le Brun)

Lord Tankerville married a French woman, Corisande Armandine Sophie Léonie Hélène de Gramont, daughter of Antoine Louis Marie de Gramont, duc de Gramont, at Devonshire House, London, on 28 July 1806. They had two children, Charles Bennet, 6th Earl of Tankerville and Lady Corisande Emma Bennett, who married James Harris, 3rd Earl of Malmesbury. Lord Tankerville died in June 1859, aged 83, and was succeeded by his only son, Charles. The Countess of Tankerville died in January 1865.

Parliament of the United Kingdom
Preceded by James Lloyd; Robert Hurst	Member of Parliament for Steyning; 1803–1806; With: James Lloyd 1803–1806; Sir Arthur Leary Piggott 1806	Succeeded by James Lloyd; Robert Hurst
Preceded by Lord John Townshend; Viscount Duncannon	Member of Parliament for Knaresborough; 1806–1818; With: Lord John Townshend	Succeeded by George Tierney; Sir James Mackintosh
Preceded by Alexander Allan; Henry St Paul	Member of Parliament for Berwick-upon-Tweed; 1820–1823; With: Sir David Milne 1820; Henry St Paul 1820; Sir Francis Blake, Bt 1820–1823	Succeeded by Sir Francis Blake, Bt; Sir John Beresford, Bt
Political offices
Preceded by Viscount Stopford	Treasurer of the Household; 1806–1807	Succeeded by Viscount Stopford
Peerage of Great Britain
Preceded by Charles Bennet	Earl of Tankerville; 1822–1859	Succeeded by Charles Bennet
Preceded by Charles Bennet	Baron Ossulston (descended by acceleration); 1822–1859	Succeeded by Charles Bennet
