= Thomas Colebrooke =

Thomas Colebrooke may refer to:

- Sir Edward Colebrooke, 4th Baronet (1813–1890), British politician
- Henry Thomas Colebrooke (1765–1837), English orientalist and mathematician
