= George Newnham =

British Member of Parliament (died 1800)

George Lewis Newnham (c. 1733–1800) was an English lawyer and politician who sat in the House of Commons from 1774 to 1780.

Newnham was the eldest son of Nathaniel Newnham, a London merchant and MP, and his wife Sarah Adams. He was educated at Eton College from 1745 to 1748 and was admitted to Lincoln's Inn on 20 November 1749 and Clare College, Cambridge on 10 April 1751. He was called to the bar on 3 February 1757.

Newnham's father recommended his son to the Duke of Newcastle for a seat in Parliament in 1761, but the Duke appeared to exclude him from opportunities at Lewes. In 1768 Newnham stood at Nottingham but withdrew before the poll. He became a Bencher of Lincoln's Inn and King's Counsel in 1772. At the 1774 general election, he was returned unopposed as Member of Parliament for Arundel on the interest of Sir John Shelley. In Parliament he voted with the opposition, but does not appear to have spoken. He did not stand in the 1780 general election.

Newnham married Mary Ashton of Lincoln's Inn Fields on 7 October 1778. He succeeded to his mother's Newtimber estate on her death in 1788. He died on 2 August 1800. He and his wife Mary had one son.

Parliament of Great Britain
Preceded by Sir George Colebrooke, Bt; John Stewart	Member of Parliament for Arundel; 1774–1780; With: Thomas Brand	Succeeded by Sir Patrick Crauford; Thomas Fitzherbert
