= Thomas Brand (British politician, born 1749) =

British Member of Parliament (1749–1794)

Thomas Brand (17 September 1749 – 21 February 1794) was an English country landowner of Kimpton, Hertfordshire and politician who sat in the House of Commons from 1774 to 1780.

== Biography ==
Brand was born on 17 September 1749, the eldest son of Thomas Brand of The Hoo, Kimpton, Hertfordshire and his wife Lady Caroline Pierrepont daughter of Evelyn Pierrepont, 1st Duke of Kingston-upon-Hull. He was educated at Westminster School in 1764 and was admitted at Trinity College, Cambridge on 19 January 1765. In August 1770 he succeeded his father to The Hoo. He married Gertrude Roper, daughter of Charles Roper on 20 April 1771.

Brand's estate extended into Cambridgeshire and he tried to enter Parliament in 1770 at Cambridgeshire in a by-election, but he was dismissed as an outsider, and withdrew before the poll, receiving £1,000 compensation from Sir Sampson Gideon, Bt. At the 1774 general election Brand was returned unopposed as Member of Parliament for Arundel on the interest of the Duke of Norfolk. There is no record of his having spoken in the House, and he did not stand in 1780. He stood for Cambridgeshire at a by-election in 1789 but there was such support for his opponent James Whorwood Adeane, that he withdrew before the poll.

== Death and succession ==
Brand died on 21 February 1794. His wife Gertrude succeeded her brother Trevor as Baroness Dacre on 4 July 1794 and was succeeded firstly by their eldest son Thomas and then by their second son Henry Otway. They also had a daughter Gertrude.

Parliament of Great Britain
Preceded by Sir George Colebrooke, Bt; John Stewart	Member of Parliament for Arundel; 1774–1780; With: George Newnham	Succeeded by Sir Patrick Crauford; Thomas Fitzherbert
