= Charles Bennet, 4th Earl of Tankerville =

British nobleman, collector of shells and famous patron of Surrey cricket

The Right Honourable The Earl of Tankerville
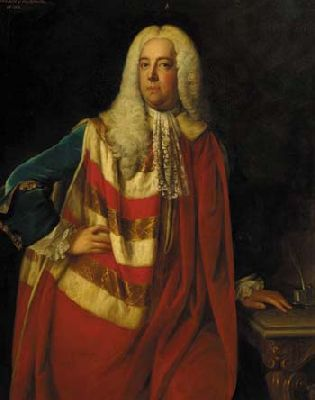
- Born: 15 November 1743; St.James's Square, Middlesex, England
- Died: 10 December 1822 (aged 79); Walton-on-Thames, England
- Other name: Lord Ossulston (from 1753 to 1767)
- Education: Eton College
- Occupation: Gentleman
- Known for: Cricket
- Title: 4th Earl of Tankerville
- Successor: Charles Augustus Bennet
- Spouse: Emma Colebrooke
- Children: 8
- Parent(s): Charles Bennet, 3rd Earl of Tankerville and Alice (née Astley)

Charles Bennet, 4th Earl of Tankerville (15 November 1743 – 10 December 1822), styled Lord Ossulston from 1753 to 1767, was a British nobleman, a collector of shells and a famous patron of Surrey cricket in the 1770s. He agreed a set of cricket rules that included the first mention of the Leg before wicket rule.

His wife, Emma, Lady Tankerville, was notable as a collector of exotic plants. The first tropical orchid to flower in England is named for her as it was it flowered in her greenhouse. Her collection of over 600 illustrations were purchased by Kew Gardens in 1932 and are still available today.

== Biography ==
Tankerville was born in 1743 and was educated at Eton College between 1753 and 1760. He succeeded to the Earldom on the death of his father on 27 October 1767 and married Emma, daughter of Sir James Colebrooke, 1st Baronet, in 1771. He and his new wife settled at Walton on Thames at his house, Mount Felix overlooking the Thames.

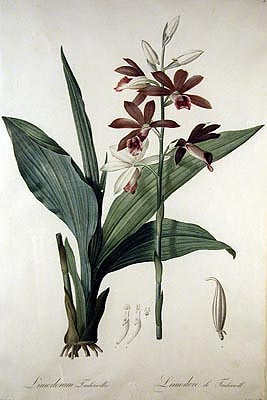
Orchid named for Charles' wife Emma. Drawing by Pierre-Joseph Redouté

Lady Tankerville amassed a large collection of exotic plants at Mount Felix. Lady Tankerville's collection was thought to be the largest in the London area. Specimens named after Lady Tankerville include the Nun's Orchid or Phaius tankervilleae. Artists were employed to create botanical drawings on vellum of the specimens.

Keen on cricket, Tankerville often played, and seems to have been a very good fielder, though he was not especially noted for batting or bowling. He was the employer of Lumpy Stevens, who was a gardener at Tankerville's Walton-on-Thames estate; and William Bedster, who was his butler. It was the accuracy of "Lumpy" Stevens that led to the introduction of a middle stump. Prior to 1776 there were only two stumps and Lumpy's deliveries could go through the hole. A permanent memorial to Lumpy Stevens has been proposed.

In 1774, Tankerville sat on the committee that formulated some early laws of cricket. They were settled and revised at the Star and Garter in Pall Mall on Friday 25 February 1774. The meeting was chaired by Sir William Draper and the committee included the Duke of Dorset, Harry Peckham and other "Noblemen and Gentlemen of Kent, Hampshire, Surrey, Sussex, Middlesex, and London". This meeting was one of the earlier sets of cricket rules and is acknowledged as being the first where the Leg before wicket rule was introduced.

Tankerville continued in his interest in cricket with Chertsey and Surrey Cricket club until 1781 when he retired from the sport and went into political office through the House of Lords. He was appointed joint postmaster general and a privy councillor in 1782, but he resigned his office in April 1783. However Tankerville was again appointed under Mr Pitt's administration in January 1784.

In 1805, Thomas Creevey wrote of him:

...he is a haughty, honorable man - has lived at one time in the heart of political leaders - was the friend of Lansdowne - has been in office several times, and is now a misanthrope, but very communicative and entertaining when he likes his man. His only remaining passion is for clever men, of which description he considers himself as one, tho' certainly unjustly.

He died on 10 December 1822 and was succeeded by his eldest son Charles Augustus.

== Legacy ==
Tankerville's other interests included maps and shells. At the end of his life his collection was sold for an undisclosed sum, but thought to be between three and four thousand pounds. There are a number of flowers, shells and gastropods with the Latin name tankervillii. The gastropod named Amalda tankervillii (Swainson, 1825) is probably named for Tankerville (or less probably his son).

Tankerville married Emma Colebrooke on 7 October 1771 in Gatton, Surrey. She was co-heir to her father Sir John Colebrooke. Lady Tankerville's collection of botanical illustrations are at the Royal Botanical Gardens, Kew. Phaius tankerville was named in her honour by Sir Joseph Banks. It was the first tropical orchid to flower in England.

Their daughter Lady Mary Elizabeth Bennet (21 May 1785 – 27 February 1861) worked with their gardener (William Richardson) to cultivate new strains of tri-colored viola pansy flowers that were presented to the botanical society and horticulture groups in 1812.

Lady Mary Elizabeth Bennet was a watercolour artist included in many exhibitions. She was trained by London artist John Varley. Her works are on exhibit and in private collections including a composition of her home at Belsay Castle rendered in 1834 after her marriage on 26 July 1831 to Sir Charles Miles Lambert Monck, Bt. The painting of her home at Belsay Castle in Northumberland by Lady Mary Elizabeth Monck was found to be included as part of the Monck estate in 1912 and now resides in a private collection in the United States.

Another of her works is the "Burial Place of the Breadalbanes from the Churchyard at Killin" done in 1826–1827 on a trip to the Scottish highlands with her brother. This haunting graveyard work may have been inspired by the seat of her father's estate as the Earl of Tankerville being at Chillingham Castle which was said to be haunted.

From 1815 to 1823 (before her marriage) artist Lady Mary Elizabeth Bennet also trained and worked with the genius London artist John Linnell in engraving as well as miniature painting on ivory. They together produced a set of (12) engravings about Chillingham Castle that were started in 1815 and not finished and published until 1818.

The Hon Henry Grey Bennet, their second son, became the member of parliament for Shrewsbury in 1806 whilst their third son, The Hon John Astley Bennet, became a captain in the Navy but died in September 1812. The 5th Earl, Charles Augustus, who was born on 28 April 1776 was treasurer of the household during the short administration of Mr Fox in 1806. Their daughter, Corisande Emma Bennett, married James Harris, 3rd Earl of Malmesbury on 13 April 1830.

Peerage of Great Britain
Preceded by Charles Bennet	Earl of Tankerville; 1767–1822	Succeeded by Charles Augustus Bennet
