= Ottershaw =

Village in Surrey, England

Coordinates: 51.368°N 0.530°W

- Location within Surrey
- Area: 2.08 km^{2} (0.80 sq mi)
- Population: 2,853 (Civil Parish 2011)
  - Density: 1,372/km^{2} (3,550/sq mi)
- District: Runnymede
- Shire county: Surrey
- Region: South East
- Country: England
- Sovereign state: United Kingdom
- Post town: Chertsey
- Postcode district: KT16
- Dialling code: 01932
- Police: Surrey
- Fire: Surrey
- Ambulance: South East Coast
- UK Parliament: Runnymede and Weybridge

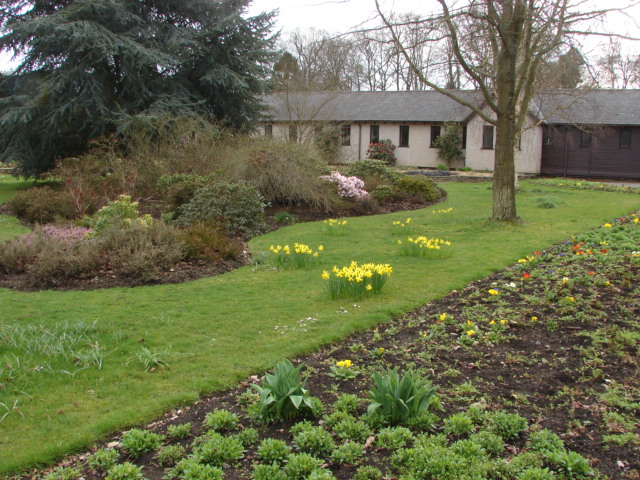
Ottershaw Memorial Garden

Ottershaw is a village in the Borough of Runnymede in Surrey, England, approximately 32 km (20 mi) southwest of central London. The village developed in the mid-19th century from a number of separate hamlets and became a parish in its own right in 1871.

The nearest town is Addlestone, approximately 2 miles (3.2 km) to the east. The M25 is accessible via junction 11.

== Economy and transport ==
Ottershaw is largely a mixture of a London commuter belt and a retirement settlement. Its nearest passenger trains to London leave from Addlestone railway station, centred 2.5 miles (4.0 km) east, on a branch line, with two others on a main line a slightly greater distance to the south —; the principal one which has frequent, semi-fast services to London being West Byfleet.

== Amenities ==
A significant landmark is Christ Church. Sir Edward Colebrooke (1813–90), who bought the Ottershaw Park estate in 1859, built the church on his estate as a memorial to his deceased son and heir. From its consecration in 1864, it was opened to the local community for worship.

A junior school here is linked to this church. A boarding school for boys, Ottershaw School, was founded in 1948 in Ottershaw Park; it closed in 1980. The school buildings were converted for residential use.

== History ==
The Ottershaw Society has carried out a comparative, now and then, survey of the village comprising more than 1,000 images (photographs and illustrations) from the mid-19th century to the present time, older residents' memories and various other historical written material. The Victoria County History collaborative historians' work captures the village under its Chertsey entries, as with Addlestone, considering in its 1910s edition some ties to Chertsey remained strong.

== Leisure ==
Foxhills Golf Club is in the more rural western side of the area. The village has two pubs: the Otter, which has a restaurant, and the Castle in Brox Road. It also has an Indian restaurant, Three Rooms.

Ottershaw FC play their home games at Egham Cricket Club. Homewood parkrun takes place in Ottershaw Memorial Fields each Saturday at 9 am. It initially took place in Homewood park, but moved to Ottershaw after 13 events.

== Notable residents ==
=== Living people ===
- Oliver James, musician and actor, was born in 1980 in Ottershaw.
- Stuart Dillon (Astronaut).
- John Romer, Egyptologist and historian, was born and educated in Ottershaw.
- Hannah Russell, British Paralympic swimmer, was born in Chertsey and lives in Ottershaw. At the 2012 Summer Paralympic Games she won silver in the S12 400m freestyle, and bronze in the 100m butterfly – setting a new British record, and bronze in the 100m backstroke.
- Laura Davies, Professional Golfer

=== Historical figures ===
- Robert Sewell, Attorney General of Jamaica and British MP, was born at Ottershaw Park.

== Ottershaw in literature ==
In the book The War of the Worlds by H. G. Wells, the fictional narrator is invited to an observatory in Ottershaw.

== See also ==
- Christ Church, Ottershaw
- Ottershaw School
