= Colebrook =

Colebrook may refer to:

== Places ==
- Colebrook, Tasmania, a locality in the electoral division of Apsley, Australia
- Colebrooke, Devon, England
- Colebrook, Connecticut, U.S.
- Colebrook, New Hampshire, U.S., a New England town
  - Colebrook (CDP), New Hampshire, U.S., village within the town
- Colebrook Township, Ashtabula County, Ohio, U.S.
- Colebrook Township, Clinton County, Pennsylvania, U.S.

== Other uses ==
- Colebrook equation, an implicit equation of pipe friction, by Cyril Frank Colebrook (1910–1997)
- Colebrook Home, a children's home for Australian Aboriginal children (1927–1981)
- Joan Colebrook (1910–1991), Australian American journalist and author
- Leonard Colebrook (1883–1967), English physician

== See also ==
- Coalbrook (disambiguation)
- Colebrooke (disambiguation)
- Colnbrook, a village near Slough, England
