= Christ Church, Ottershaw =

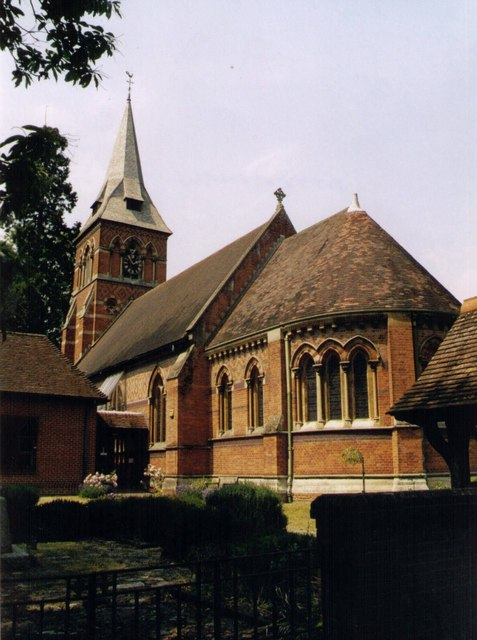
- Christ Church, Ottershaw

- Location in Surrey
- 51°21′39.5″N 0°32′6.7″W
- Location: Guildford Road, Ottershaw, Chertsey, Surrey KT16 0PB
- Country: England
- Denomination: Anglican
- Website: www.ottershawchurch.com

History
- Founded: 1863
- Founder: Sir Edward Colebrooke
- Consecrated: 1864

Architecture
- Functional status: Active
- Heritage designation: Grade II
- Architect: Sir George Gilbert Scott
- Architectural type: Church

Administration
- Province: Province of Canterbury
- Diocese: Diocese of Guildford
- Archdeaconry: Dorking
- Deanery: Runnymede

Clergy
- Vicar: Mark Potter

Listed Building – Grade II
- Official name: Christchurch
- Designated: 18 June 1973
- Reference no.: 1260037

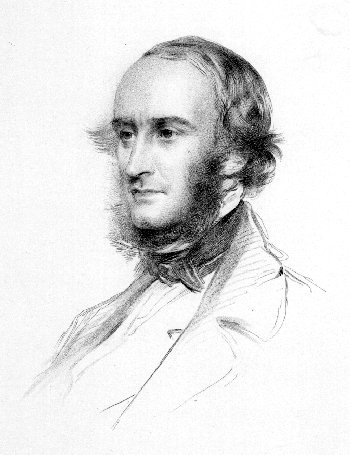
Sir Edward Colebrooke, who founded the church

Christ Church, Ottershaw is a Church of England church on Guildford Road in the village of Ottershaw in the Runnymede district of Surrey, England, about 20 miles south-west of London. Grade II listed, it was designed by Sir George Gilbert Scott (1811–1878).

Sir Edward Colebrooke (1813–1890), who came to live in Ottershaw in 1859, built a chapel on his estate in 1863 as a memorial to his deceased son and heir. Later this became the village church.

The church, one of the few polychromatic brick churches designed by Scott, retains most of its original features. A tower, the gift of Edward Gibb, was added in 1885 and new parish rooms in the 1990s.

The nave and chancel windows, designed by Charles Eamer Kempe (1837–1907), contain several examples of Kempe's signature, a tiny wheatsheaf. They were installed in 1901, replacing the original plain glass. Kempe also designed the altarpiece. Installed in 1901, it was made by the Sussex-based firm Norman and Burt and incorporates wooden figures carved in Oberammergau, in Bavaria, Germany.

Two Commonwealth servicemen of World War II – Leading Aircraftman George Barnett of the Royal Air Force Volunteer Reserve (who died on 17 October 1943) and Corporal Alexander Cook of the Worcestershire Regiment (who died on 21 September 1947) – are buried in the churchyard.
