= Emma, Lady Tankerville =

British heiress, art patron and botanist (1752–1836)

The Right Honourable The Countess of Tankerville
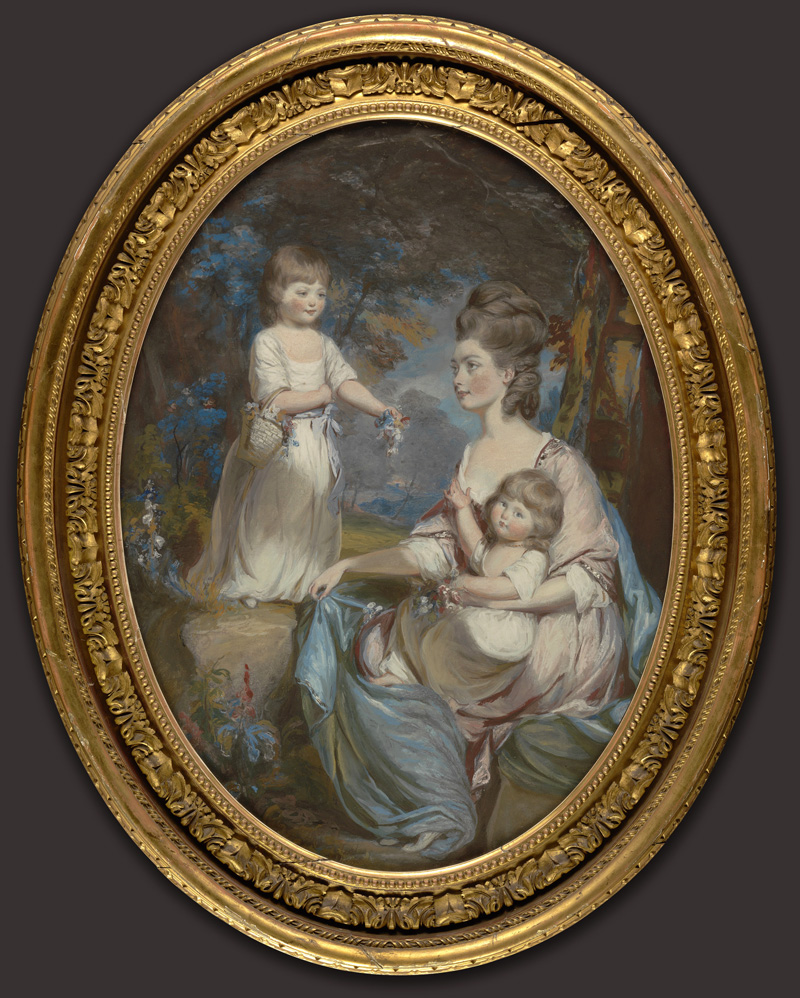
- Lady Tankerville and her eldest daughters Anna and Caroline by Daniel Gardner
- Born: Emma Colebrooke; 1752; Gatton, Surrey
- Died: 20 November 1836 (aged 83–84); Walton on Thames
- Occupations: Artist, art patron and gardener
- Known for: creating the first flowering tropical orchid in Britain and funding botanic art
- Spouse: Charles Bennet, 4th Earl of Tankerville
- Children: 11
- Parent(s): Lady Mary (born Skyner) and Sir James Colebrooke

Emma Bennet, Countess of Tankerville (1752 – 20 November 1836) born Emma Colebrooke was a British heiress, art patron and botanist. Lady Tankerville's collection of botanical illustrations are held at the Royal Botanic Gardens, Kew. Phaius tankerville was named in her honour by Sir Joseph Banks because she was the first person to make it flower successfully in England.

== Life ==
She was one of two daughters of Mary (born Skyner) and James Colebrooke. Her father was a member of parliament from 1751 to 1761 and the owner of Gatton Park.

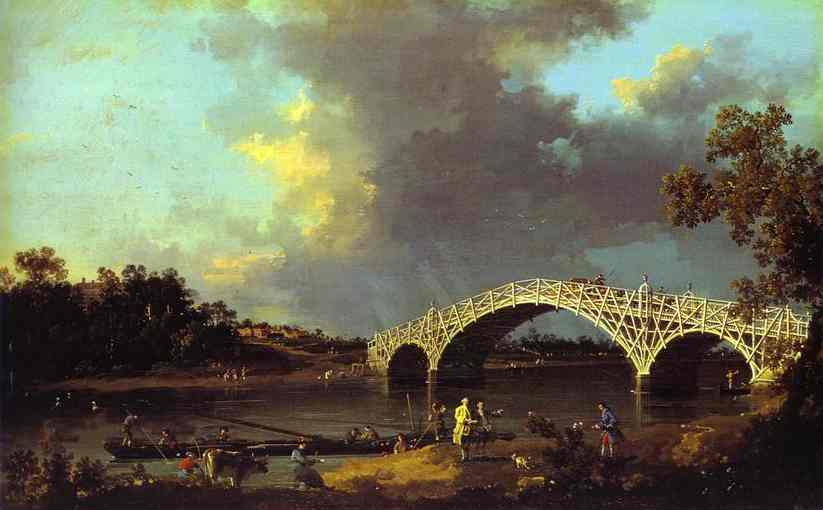
Walton Bridge by Canaletto (dated 1756) - Walton House is the house on the hill and the bridge was on their estate

With her sister Mary, Emma inherited her parents' estate when they died in 1761. Emma and Mary were raised largely by their uncle George Colebrooke, a banker and Chairman of the East India Company.

She married Charles Bennet, 4th Earl of Tankerville on 7 October 1771 at Gatton, Surrey making her the 4th Countess of Tankerville. He was a cricket enthusiast and a collector of shells. They would have eleven children. While her two eldest children were young she was painted by Daniel Gardner. The painting shows her, and two of her daughters, Caroline and Anna. The inclusion of flowers hints at her interest in botany.

She and her husband had interests in the lands and slaves on Antigua and they owned agricultural land in Northumberland. They also owned a very profitable lead mine. They divided their time between Chillingham Castle in Northumberland and their house 'Walton House' at Walton on Thames in Surrey.

Thomas Creevey wrote of her in 1805:

Lady Tankerville has perhaps as much merit as any woman in England. She is, too, very clever, and has great wit; but she, like her Lord, is depress'd and unhappy.

The Hon Henry Grey Bennet, their second son, became the member of parliament for Shrewsbury in 1806 whilst their third son, The Hon John Astley Bennet, became a captain in the Navy but died in September 1812. The 5th Earl, Charles Augustus, who was born on 28 April 1776 was treasurer of the household during the short administration of Mr Fox in 1806.

In 1811, she moved to Madeira in Portugal with two of her children, to aid their recovery from consumption. Drawings she completed during the 18 months she spent on the island were made into an exhibition at Northumberland County Council in 2023.

== Botanical career ==
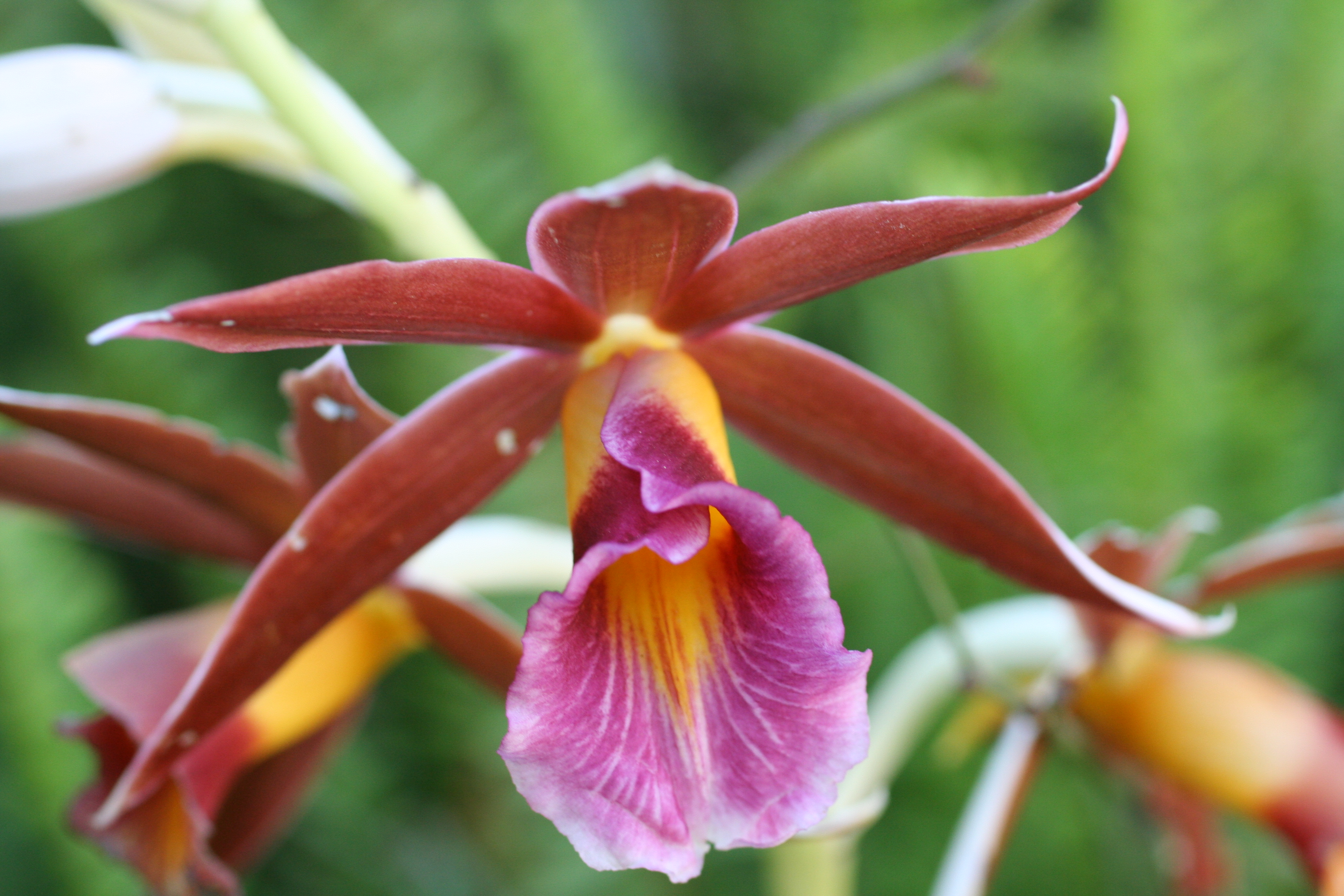
Phaius tankerville named for Lady Emma Tankerville.

Lady Tankerville's collection of botanical paintings has been described as 'a jewel of the Kew Gardens archives'. The collection was donated to Kew Gardens in 1932 and comprises 648 watercolours of plants and flowers. The drawings represented every flower cultivated by Lady Tankerville at Walton House in Surrey.

During Lady Tankerville's lifetime, women in England were not allowed to attend university or join the Royal Society; both of which would have allowed her to pursue a scientific or artistic career. Despite this, she included scientific scope notes on the margins and backs of her the paintings in her collection outlining such things as classification, conditions for growth, history, and her own observations.

Lady Tankerville collected and funded hundreds of botanical illustrations. Phaius tankerville was named in her honour by her friend Sir Joseph Banks. Her Phaius tankerville was the first tropical orchid to flower in England and it flowered in her greenhouse at Walton House.

The gardens at Mount Felix were well regarded many years after her death.

=== Botanical Works by Mary Elizabeth Bennet ===
In addition, her daughter Lady Mary Elizabeth Bennet (21 May 1785 to 27 February 1861) worked with their gardener (William Richardson) to cultivate new strains of tri-colored viola pansy flowers that were presented to the botanical society and horticulture groups in 1812. Lady Mary Elizabeth Bennet was an accomplished artist in watercolor and was invited to many exhibitions. She was trained by London artist John Varley.

Her works are in private collections including a composition of her home at Belsay Castle rendered in 1834 after her marriage on 26 July 1831 to Sir Charles Miles Lambert Monck, Bt. The painting of her home at Belsay Castle in Northumberland by Lady Mary Elizabeth Monck was found to be included as part of the Monck estate in 1912 and now resides in a private collection in the US. Another of her works is the Burial Place of the Breadalbanes from the Churchyard at Killin done in 1826-1827 on a trip to the Scottish highlands with her brother. This haunting graveyard work may have been inspired by the seat of her father's estate as the Earl of Tankerville being at Chillingham Castle.

Lady Mary Elizabeth Bennet also trained and worked with the London artist John Linnell in engraving as well as miniature painting on ivory. They together produced a set of (12) engravings about Chillingham Castle that were started in 1815 and not finished and published until 1818. Linell gave Bennet lessons in painting on ivory in 1822/3.
