= Coalbrook (disambiguation) =

Coalbrook is a village in County Tipperary, Ireland.

Coalbrook or Coal Brook may also refer to:

- Coal Brook, a tributary of the Lackawanna River in Pennsylvania, United States
- Coalbrook, original name of Holly Country, a town in the Free State, South Africa
  - Coalbrook coal mine, site of the Coalbrook mining disaster of 1960

== See also ==
- Colebrook (disambiguation)
- Colebrooke (disambiguation)
