= Henry Trevor, 21st Baron Dacre =

British Army general

General The Right Honourable The Lord Dacre CB
- Born: Henry Otway Brand; 27 July 1777
- Died: 2 June 1853 (aged 75)
- Spouse: Pyne Crosbie
- Children: 6, including: Thomas Trevor, 22nd Baron Dacre; Henry Brand, 1st Viscount Hampden
- Relatives: Thomas Brand (father); Thomas Brand, 20th Baron Dacre (brother)
- Military career
- Allegiance: United Kingdom
- Branch: British Army
- Service years: 1793–1853
- Rank: General
- Unit: Coldstream Guards
- Commands: 1st Battalion, Coldstream Guards
- Conflicts: French Revolutionary Wars; Flanders campaign; Napoleonic Wars; Battle of Copenhagen; Peninsular War; Second Battle of Porto; Battle of Talavera; Battle of Bussaco; Battle of Salamanca; Siege of Burgos
- Awards: Companion of the Order of the Bath; Army Gold Medal; Military General Service Medal
- Memorials: Royal Military Chapel, Wellington Barracks (destroyed 1944)

General Henry Otway Trevor, 21st Baron Dacre, CB (27 July 1777 – 2 June 1853) was a peer and British Army officer.

== Early life ==
Born Henry Otway Brand, he was the second son of Thomas Brand and his wife the 19th Baroness Dacre.

== Career ==
In 1807, he fought at Copenhagen and commanded the 1st Battalion of the Coldstream Guards during the Peninsular War, seeing action at Salamanca, Talavera and Buçaco. In 1815, he was appointed a Companion of the Order of the Bath and on inheriting the estates of his cousin, John Trevor-Hampden, 3rd Viscount Hampden, changed his surname to Trevor. In 1851, he inherited his childless brother's title and also became a general that year.

== Personal life ==
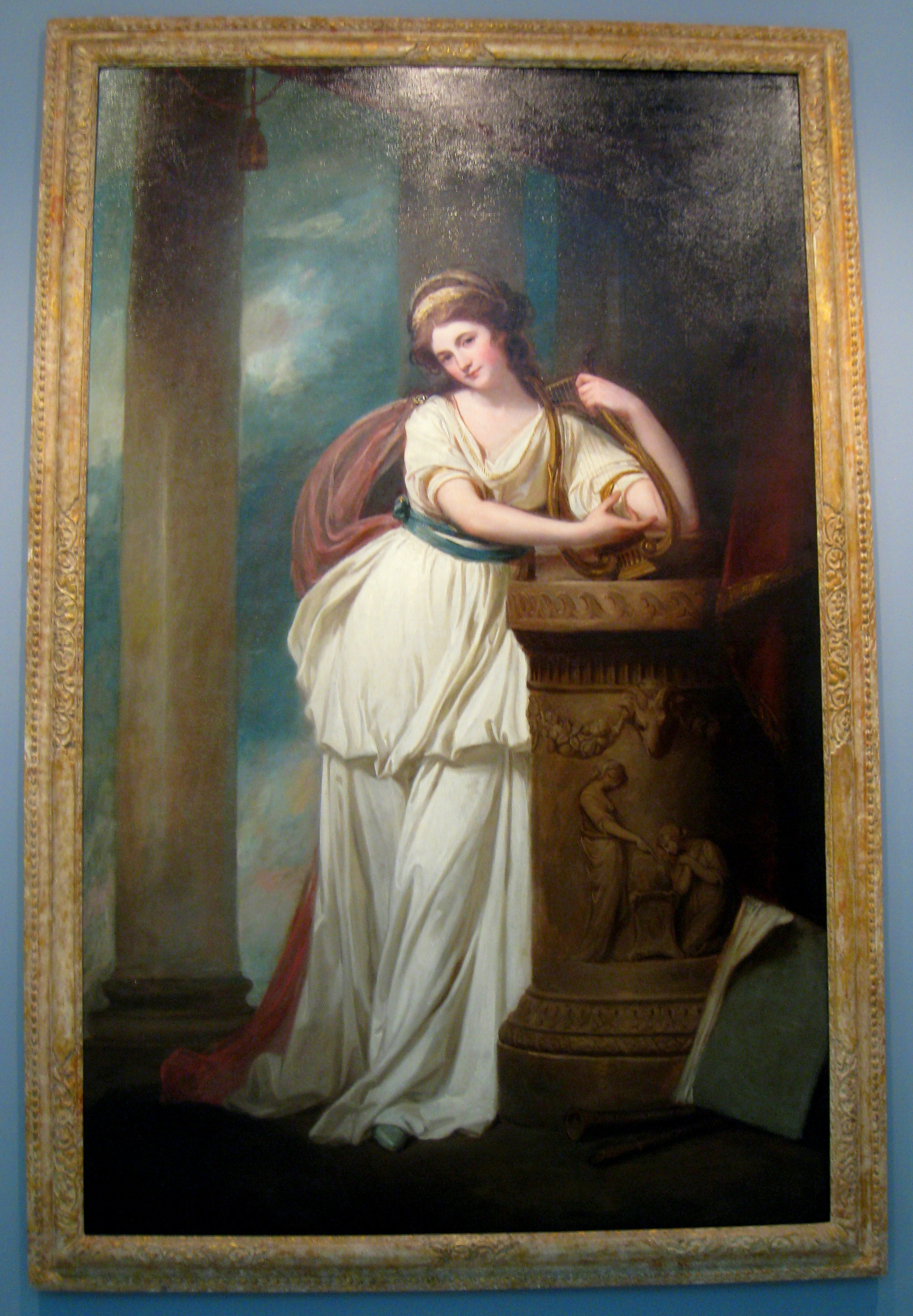
Pyne Crosbie, aka Hon. Mrs. Trevor, aka Hon. Mrs Brand, aka Lady or Baroness Dacre, by George Romney, 1779.

On 24 August 1806, he married Pyne Crosbie (a sister of William Crosbie, 4th Baron Brandon and ex-wife of Sir John Gordon, 6th Baronet) and they had six children:

- Hon. Thomas Crosbie William, later 22nd Baron Dacre (1808–1890)
- Hon. Henry Bouverie William, later 23rd Baron Dacre and 1st Viscount Hampden (1814–1892)
- Hon. Pyne Jesse (d. 1872), married Sir John Henry Cotterell, had one son Sir Geers Cotterell, 3rd Baronet. After his death, she married Granville Harcourt-Vernon.
- Hon. Julia (d. 1858), married Samuel Charles Whitbread.
- Hon. Gertrude (d. 1883), married Sir George Seymour.
- Hon. Frederica Mary Jane (1812–1873).

Upon the death of Lord Dacre in 1853, his title passed to his eldest son, Thomas.

== Sources ==
- Burke's Peerage & Gentry

Military offices
Preceded by Sir Colin Halkett	Colonel of the 31st (Huntingdonshire) Regiment of Foot; 1847–1853	Succeeded by Sir Alexander Leith
Peerage of England
Preceded by Thomas Brand	Baron Dacre; 1851–1853	Succeeded by Thomas Trevor
