= Henry Grey Bennet =

British politician

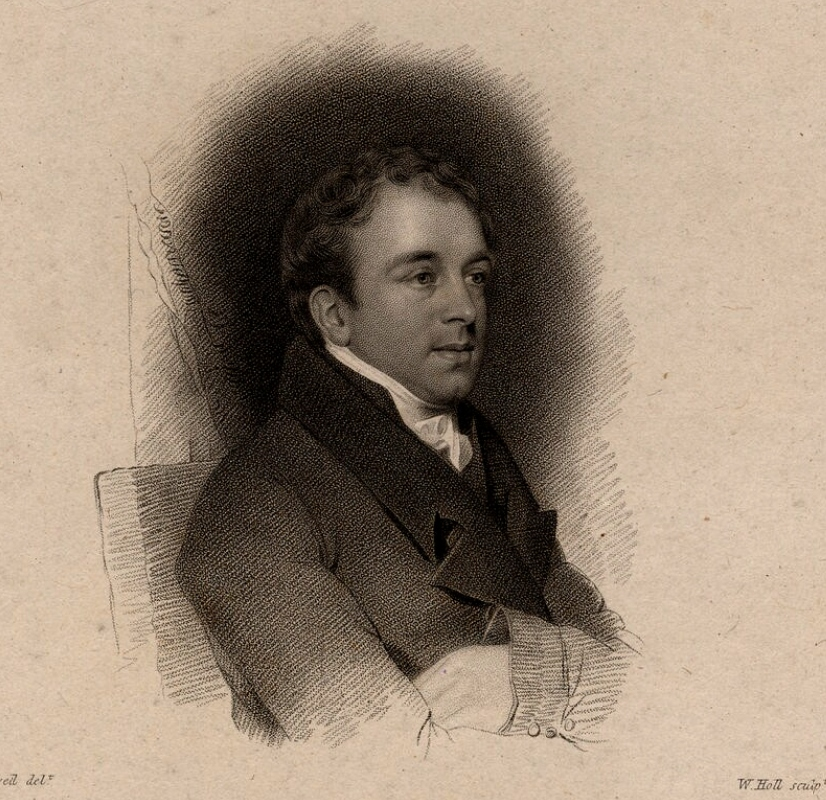

The Honourable Henry Grey Bennet FRS (2 December 1777 – 29 May 1836) was a British politician.

== Life ==
Bennet was the second of three sons and fourth of eight children of Charles Bennet, 4th Earl of Tankerville, and his wife, Emma, Lady Tankerville (1752–1836), daughter of banker Sir James Colebrooke, 1st Baronet.

He was educated at Eton College (1788–92), served in the 1st Foot Guards, and entered Lincoln's Inn in 1798, and Peterhouse, Cambridge, in 1799. He was called to the bar in 1803, practising on the Western Circuit.

Bennet's first election as MP for Shrewsbury in 1806 was invalidated. His advocacy of Catholic emancipation led to defeat in 1807 but he regained his seat in 1811. In the Commons his maiden speech was directed at the Prince Regent.

From 1813 to 1815 he was the second president of the Geological Society of London; the Lyell Collection contains his account of the Island of Tenerife.

After the Peterloo massacre in 1819 he called for an inquiry into the manufacturing districts' plight. His defence of Queen Caroline in 1820–21 led to his portrayal in an engraving by Francis Holl.

The sudden ending of Bennet's career in 1824 (apparently due to the death from consumption of his only son six months after that of a daughter) was followed by a continental trip in 1825. His reputation was ruined by the threat of prosecution for importuning a young male servant at Spa in August 1825. Bennet represented himself as the victim of a conspiracy to extort money, but the facts of the case worked against him. When Parliament was dissolved in 1826 his name was linked with that of the homosexual Richard Heber.

Bennet remained in exile and gave up his seat in parliament the following year. He and his wife lived near Lake Como in Italy until his death aged 58 in 1836.

Bennet was the author of several pamphlets, and a fellow of the Royal Society.

== Family ==
In 1816 Bennet married Gertrude Frances, daughter of Lord William Russell. They had one son and three daughters. Gertrude died in 1841.

Parliament of the United Kingdom
Preceded by Thomas Jones; William Noel-Hill	Member of Parliament for Shrewsbury; 1811–1826; With: William Noel-Hill 1811–1812; Sir Rowland Hill 1812–1814; Richard Lyster 1814–1819; John Mytton 1819–1820; Panton Corbett 1820–1826	Succeeded by Robert Aglionby Slaney; Panton Corbett
