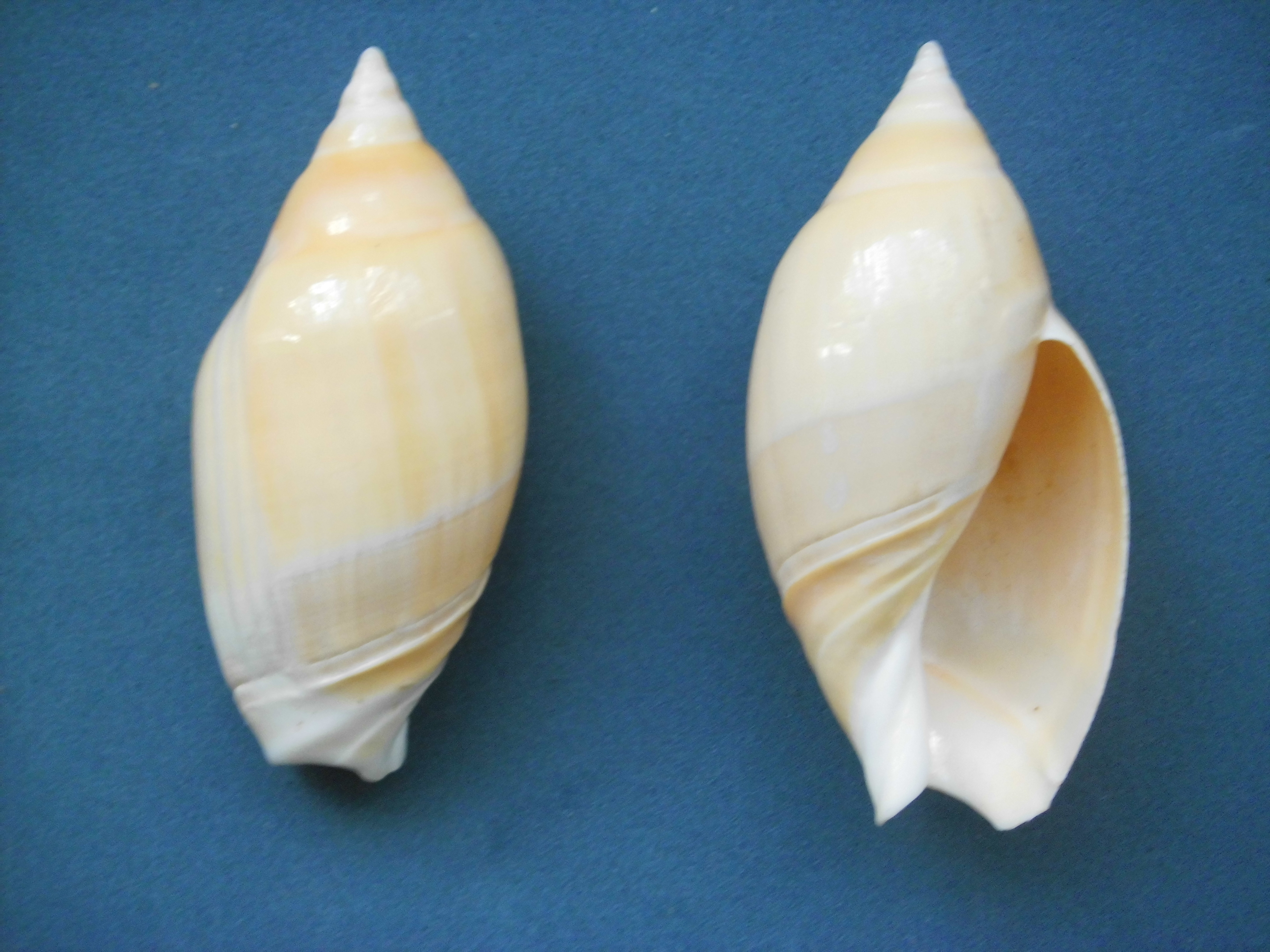
- Amalda tankervillii shell

Scientific classification
- Kingdom: Animalia
- Phylum: Mollusca
- Class: Gastropoda
- Subclass: Caenogastropoda
- Order: Neogastropoda
- Family: Ancillariidae
- Genus: Amalda
- Species: A. tankervillii

Binomial name
- Amalda tankervillii (Swainson, 1825)

Synonyms
- Ancilla venezuelana Weisbord, N.E., 1962; Ancillaria tankervillii Swainson, 1825; Amalda tankervillei (Swainson, 1825) (misspelling); Ancilla tankervillii (Swainson, 1825)

= Amalda tankervillii =

Species of gastropod

Amalda tankervillii is a species of sea snail, a marine gastropod mollusk in the family Ancillariidae.

This gastropod (Swainson, 1825) is probably named for Charles Bennet, 4th Earl of Tankerville (or less probably his son).

== Description ==
The size of the shell varies between 25 mm and 91 mm.

It conchologically quite different from the other species included in the genus. It is indeed somewhat different from Indo-Pacific species in being thin, broadly oval, with a large inflated last whorl and a very low spire.

The shell is ovately fusiform, with a pale yellowish or dull flesh color and an acuminated spire. Just above the suture is a distinct elevated line. The upper part of the body whorl is encircled by a broad callous belt that covers about two-thirds of the whorl. Remarkably, this belt widens as the shell ages.

Below this belt is a deeply impressed line that ends in a sharp, projecting tooth near the lower edge of the outer lip. Below the line, two additional belts are present, with the upper belt featuring a slightly raised upper edge and a central depression. A deep groove sits just above the columellar varix, which is smooth and has a single groove.

The aperture is somewhat blunt at the top and notched at the base. The outer lip has a smooth edge with a single tooth near its lower part.

== Distribution ==
This species occurs in the Caribbean Sea in shallow waters (6 mm to 70 mm) off Venezuela and down to Brazil.
