= Thomas Brand, 20th Baron Dacre =

British politician

Thomas Brand, 20th Baron Dacre (25 March 1774 – 21 March 1851) was a British peer and Whig politician.

== Background ==
Dacre was the eldest son of Thomas Brand, of The Hoo, Hertfordshire, and Gertrude, 19th Baroness Dacre, daughter of the Hon. Charles Roper.

== Military career ==
He raised and commanded the Kimpton Volunteer Rifles, a part-time unit of the Volunteer Corps formed in 1803. In 1808 the volunteers were replaced by the Local Militia, and Brand commanded the Midland Battalion, Hertfordshire Local Militia, based at Hitchin.

== Political career ==
Dacre entered Parliament for Helston in January 1807, a seat he only held until May of the same year, when he was returned for Hertfordshire. He continued to represent this constituency until 1819, when he succeeded his mother in the barony of Dacre and entered the House of Lords.

== Personal life ==
Lord Dacre married Barbarina, daughter of Admiral Sir Chaloner Ogle, 1st Baronet and widow of Valentine Wilmot, in 1819. The marriage was childless. He died at The Hoo, Hertfordshire, in March 1851, aged 76, and was succeeded in the barony by his younger brother, Henry. Lady Dacre died in London in May 1854, aged 86.

Parliament of the United Kingdom
Preceded by Vacant; John de Ponthieu	Member of Parliament for Helston; 1807; With: John de Ponthieu	Succeeded by Sir John St Aubyn, Bt; Richard Richards
Preceded by William Plumer; William Baker	Member of Parliament for Hertfordshire; 1807–1819; With: Sir John Sebright, Bt	Succeeded by Sir John Sebright, Bt; Hon. William Lamb
Peerage of England
Preceded by Gertrude Brand	Baron Dacre; 1819–1851	Succeeded by Henry Otway Trevor
