= Baron Colebrooke =

Extinct barony in the Peerage of the United Kingdom

Escutcheon of the Colebrooke baronets of Gatton, and of Baron Colebrooke

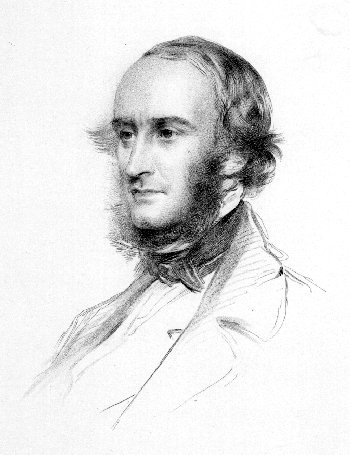
Sir Thomas Edward Colebrooke, 4th Baronet

Baron Colebrooke, of Stebunheath in the County of Middlesex, was a title in the Peerage of the United Kingdom. It was created in 1906 for Sir Edward Colebrooke, 5th Baronet. He held several positions at the British court.

== History ==
The Colebrooke family descended from the London banker James Colebrooke. His second son James Colebrooke represented Gatton in the House of Commons. On 12 October 1759 he was created a baronet, of Gatton in the County of Surrey, in the Baronetage of Great Britain, with special remainder to his younger brother George. He was succeeded according to the remainder by his younger brother George, the 2nd Baronet. He was Member of Parliament for Arundel, and also served as Chairman of the Honourable East India Company.

On the 2nd Baronet's death the title passed to his second but eldest surviving son, the 3rd Baronet. He died childless and was succeeded by his nephew, the 4th Baronet. He represented Taunton, Lanarkshire and North Lanarkshire in Parliament. He was succeeded by his eldest son, the 5th Baronet, who was elevated to the peerage in 1906.

Lord Colebrooke had no surviving male issue and on his death in 1939 both the baronetcy and barony became extinct.

== Colebrooke baronets, of Gatton (1759) ==
- Sir James Colebrooke, 1st Baronet (1722–1761)
- Sir George Colebrooke, 2nd Baronet (1729–1809)
- Sir James Edward Colebrooke, 3rd Baronet (1761–1838)
- Sir Thomas Edward Colebrooke, 4th Baronet (1813–1890)
- Sir Edward Arthur Colebrooke, 5th Baronet (1861–1939) (created Baron Colebrooke in 1906)

== Barons Colebrooke (1906) ==
- Edward Arthur Colebrooke, 1st Baron Colebrooke (1861–1939)

== Extended family ==
- Robert Colebrooke (1718–1784), elder brother of the 1st and 2nd Baronets, sat as Member of Parliament for Maldon.
- Henry Colebrooke, an administrator in India and Sanskrit scholar, third son of the 2nd Baronet, was the father of the 4th Baronet.

Baronetage of Great Britain
Preceded by Glyn baronets	Colebrooke baronets of Gatton; 12 October 1759	Succeeded by Fludyer baronets
