= Edward Colebrooke, 1st Baron Colebrooke =

British Liberal politician and courtier (1861–1939)

The Right Honourable The Lord Colebrooke GCVO PC DL

Captain of the Honourable Corps of Gentlemen-at-Arms
- In office 26 June 1911 – 19 October 1922
- Monarch: George V
- Prime Minister: H. H. Asquith; David Lloyd George
- Preceded by: The Lord Denman
- Succeeded by: The Earl of Clarendon

Personal details
- Born: 12 October 1861
- Died: 28 February 1939 (aged 77)
- Party: Liberal
- Spouse(s): Alexandra Harriet Paget (d. 1944)

Edward Arthur Colebrooke, 1st Baron Colebrooke, GCVO, PC, DL (12 October 1861 – 28 February 1939), known as Sir Edward Colebrooke, Bt, from 1890 to 1906, was a British Liberal politician and courtier. He served as Captain of the Honourable Corps of Gentlemen-at-Arms under H. H. Asquith and David Lloyd George between 1911 and 1922.

== Background ==
Colebrooke was the son of Sir Thomas Colebrooke, 4th Baronet, and his wife Elizabeth Margaret Richardson, daughter of J. Richardson. He succeeded his father in the baronetcy in 1890.

== Political career ==
In 1906 Colebrooke was raised to the peerage as Baron Colebrooke, of Stebunheath in the County of Middlesex. He served under Sir Henry Campbell-Bannerman and H. H. Asquith as a Lord-in-waiting (government whip in the House of Lords) from 1906 to 1911 and then under Asquith and later David Lloyd George as Government Chief Whip in the Lords and Captain of the Honourable Corps of Gentlemen-at-Arms from 1911 to 1922. In 1914 he was admitted to the Privy Council. Lord Colebrooke was also a Permanent Lord-in-Waiting from 1924 to 1939 and served as Lord High Commissioner to the General Assembly of the Church of Scotland from 1906 to 1907. He was admitted to the Royal Victorian Order as a Commander (CVO) in 1906, a Knight Commander (KCVO) in 1922 and a Knight Grand Cross (GCVO) in the 1927 Birthday Honours. He was also a deputy lieutenant of Lanarkshire.

== Family ==
Lord Colebrooke married Alexandra Harriet Paget, daughter of General Lord Alfred Paget, in 1889. They had one son (who died in 1921) and two daughters. He died in February 1939, aged 77, when the baronetcy and barony became extinct. Lady Colebrooke died in 1944.

Political offices
Preceded by The Lord Lawrence	Lord-in-waiting; 1906–1911	Succeeded by The Lord Willingdon
Preceded by The Lord Denman	Captain of the Honourable Corps of Gentlemen-at-Arms; 1911–1922	Succeeded by The Earl of Clarendon
Preceded by The Lord Denman	Government Chief Whip in the House of Lords; 1911–1922; With: The Duke of Devonshire 1915–1916; The Lord Hylton 1916–1922	Succeeded by The Earl of Clarendon
Baronetage of Great Britain
Preceded by Thomas Edward Colebrooke	Baronet (of Gatton); 1890–1939	Extinct
Peerage of the United Kingdom
New creation	Baron Colebrooke; 1906–1939	Extinct
