= James Colebrooke (banker) =

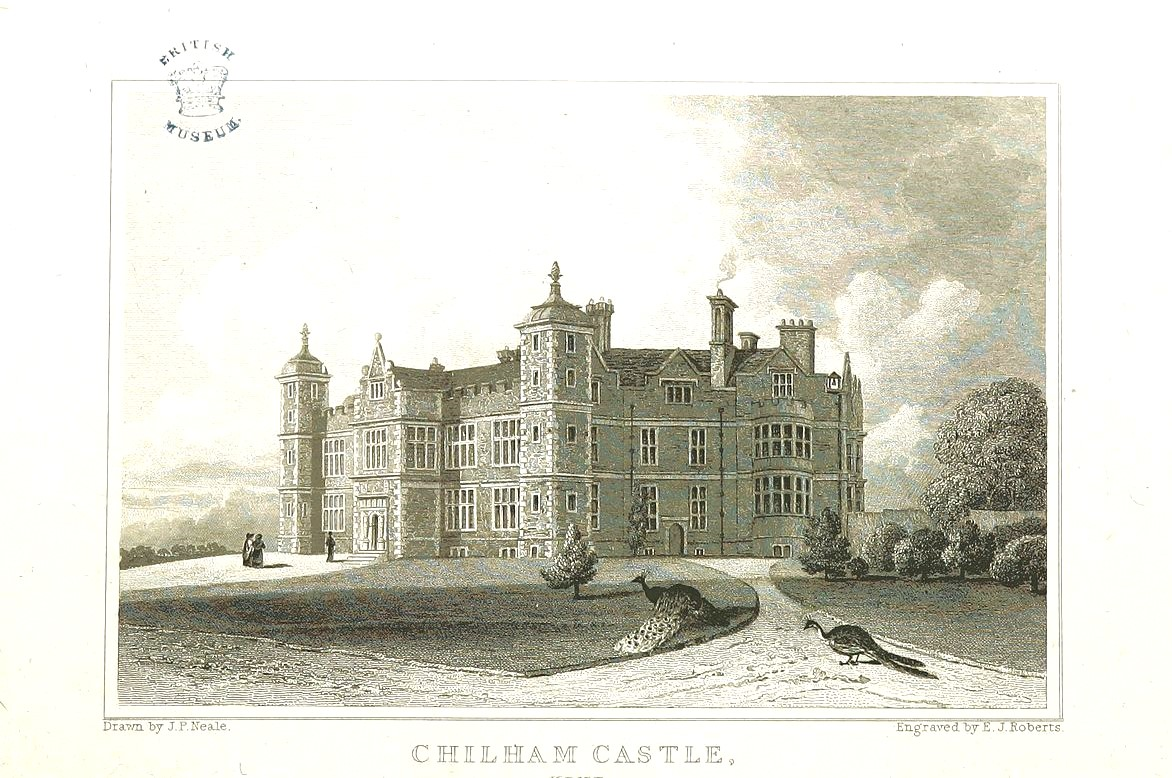
Chilham Castle, Kent, 1825

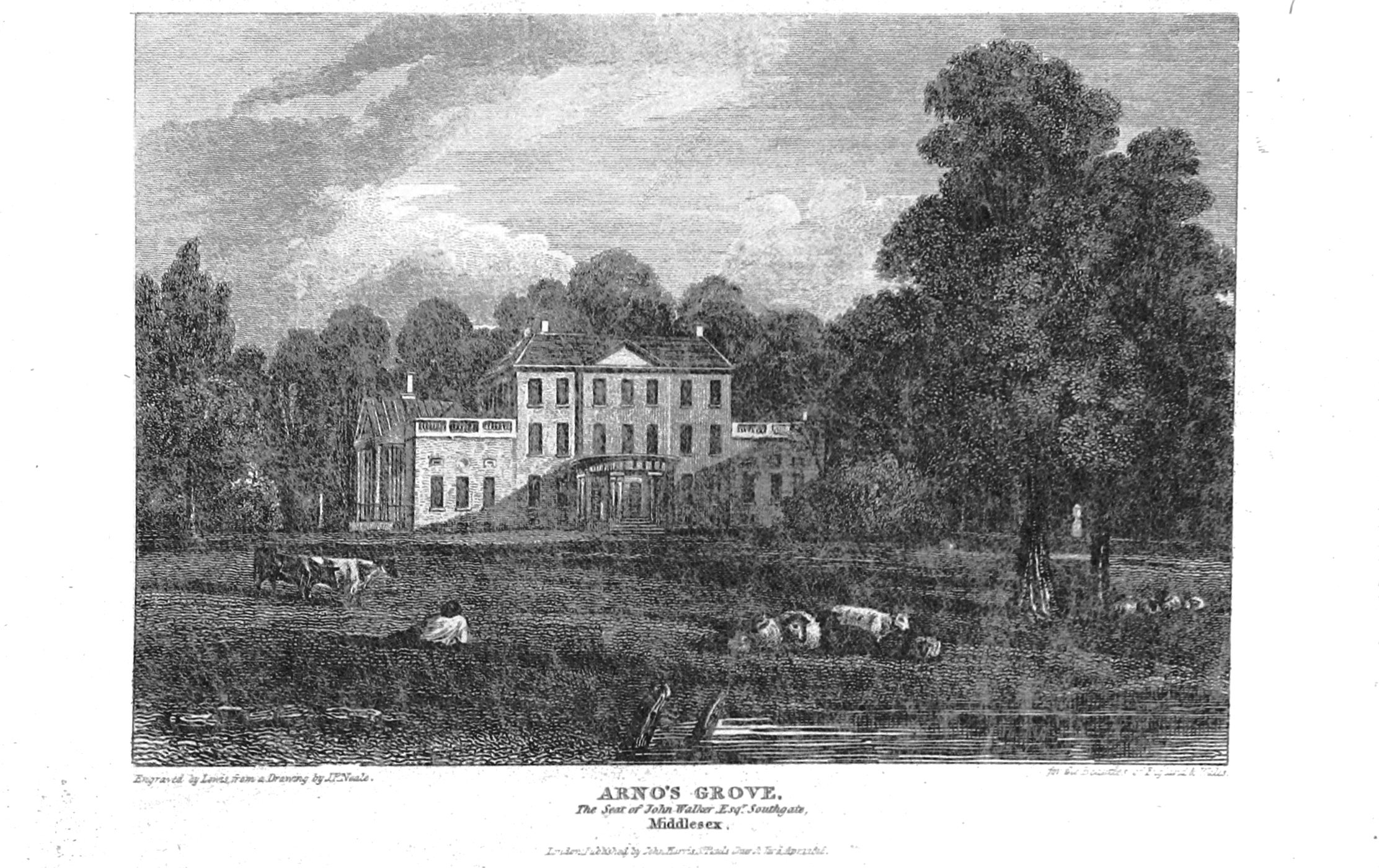
Arno's Grove, 1816

James Colebrooke (12 May 1680 – 18 November 1752) was a mercer, banker, and citizen of London.

== Early life and family ==
James Colebrooke was born at Arundel on 12 May 1680. He married Mary Hudson. They had children:

- Robert Colebrooke (died 1785)
- James Colebrooke (1722-1761)
- George Colebrooke (1729-1809)

Robert Colebrooke was member of Parliament for Maldon for 1741 to 1761 and then minister to the Swiss Cantons in 1762-64.

Both younger brothers were at first opposition Whigs, but switched support to the Duke of Newcastle's government and were rewarded in 1759 with the creation of a baronetcy for James (who had daughters but no son). A special remainder of the baronetcy allowed it to pass to George when James died in 1761.

== Career ==
Colebrooke was a merchant and banker, described by C.M. Tenison in Cokayne as "a great money scrivenor in Threadneedle Street".

He bought Chilham Castle in Kent from the Digges family. The castle was sold to Thomas Heron by Robert Colebrooke.

In 1719 or 1720 he bought from Thomas Wolstenholme the Arnolds Estate (Edmonton Hundred, Middlesex) in what is now north London. He demolished the existing manor house on the estate and set about building a larger house that became known as Arno's Grove. It was not complete at the time of his death and was finished by his son George.

== Death ==
He died on 18 November 1752.
