= Robert Colebrooke =

British Member of Parliament

Robert Colebrooke (24 June 1718 –10 May 1784) was a British Member of Parliament.

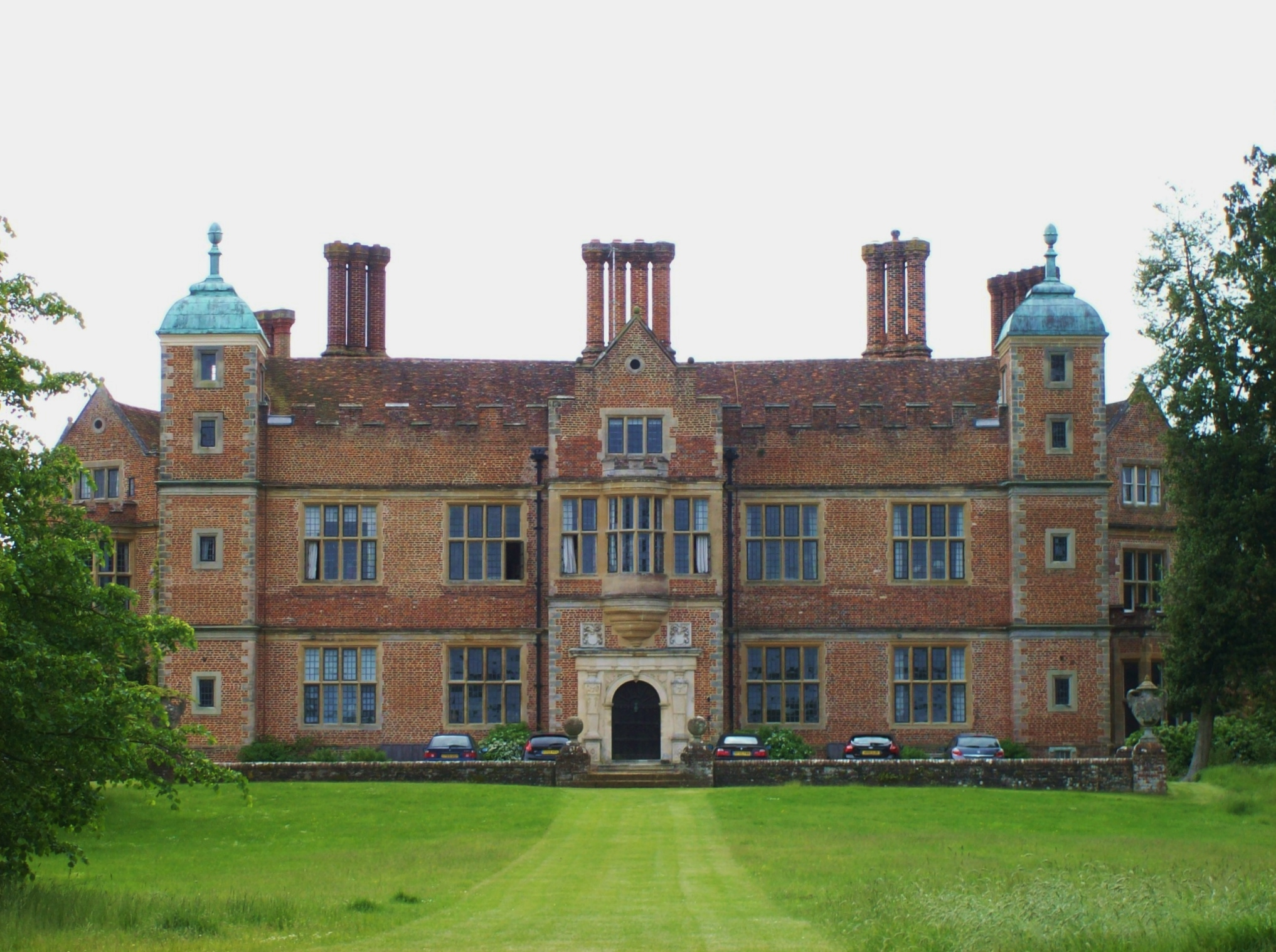
Chilham Castle

== Early life ==
Robert Colebrooke was the first son of James Colebrooke, a wealthy London banker, and his wife Mary Hudson. His younger brothers were James Colebrooke, MP and George Colebrooke, MP. Robert's father made over to him the Chilham Estate in Kent when he married in 1741. Robert would sell it in 1774 to Thomas Heron.

== Career ==
He was elected Member of Parliament for Maldon for 1741 to 1761.

He was minister to the Swiss Cantons in 1762–64.

He was Ambassador to Turkey in 1765.

== Death ==
He died at Soissons in France on 10 May 1784 and was buried at Chilham on 26 June 1784. He had married twice: firstly Henrietta (died 1753), the daughter of Lord Harry Powlett, and secondly, on 4 August 1756, Elizabeth, daughter and co-heiress of John Thresher of Bradford-on-Avon, Wiltshire. He was the father of Robert Hyde Colebrooke, one of several sons with his mistress Mary Williams (later wife of Robert Jones M.D). He had no children with either of his wives.
