= Thomas Brand (British politician, died 1770) =

English politician and landowner

Thomas Brand (c. 1717 – 1770) was an English country gentleman of The Hoo, Kimpton, Hertfordshire, and a politician who sat in the House of Commons from 1741 to 1770.

Brand was the only son of Thomas Brand and his wife Margaret Nicholl, daughter of John Nicholl of Chipping Barnet, Hertfordshire and Margaret Marsh, heiress to a property known as Pricklers, in Chipping Barnet, Hertfordshire (now known as Greenhill Gardens, New Barnet).

He was educated at Eton College (1728) and probably Queens' College, Cambridge (1735). From 1739 to 1741 he undertook the Grand Tour of Europe.

Brand was returned unopposed as Member of Parliament for New Shoreham in 1741 on the interest of John Phillipson. In 1747, he was returned as MP for Tavistock by his friend the Duke of Bedford. He became more closely connected with the Duke when he married Lady Caroline Pierrepont, the daughter of Evelyn Pierrepont, 1st Duke of Kingston-upon-Hull who was an aunt of the Duke's wife. He was returned as MP for Gatton in 1754 and for Okehampton in 1768.

Brand died in August 1770. He was succeeded by his only son Thomas who was also MP. He and his wife Caroline also had two daughters.
