= Robert Hyde Colebrooke =

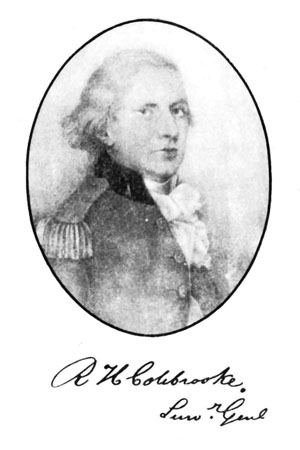
Copy of a miniature that was painted between 1790 and 1795 showing Colebrooke in a scarlet uniform with dark blue collar.

Robert Hyde Colebrooke (1762? - 21 September 1808) was a British infantry officer in India who conducted early surveys in Bengal and Mysore before becoming Surveyor General of Bengal, a position he held from 1788 to 1794 succeeding Alexander Kyd.

== Life and work ==
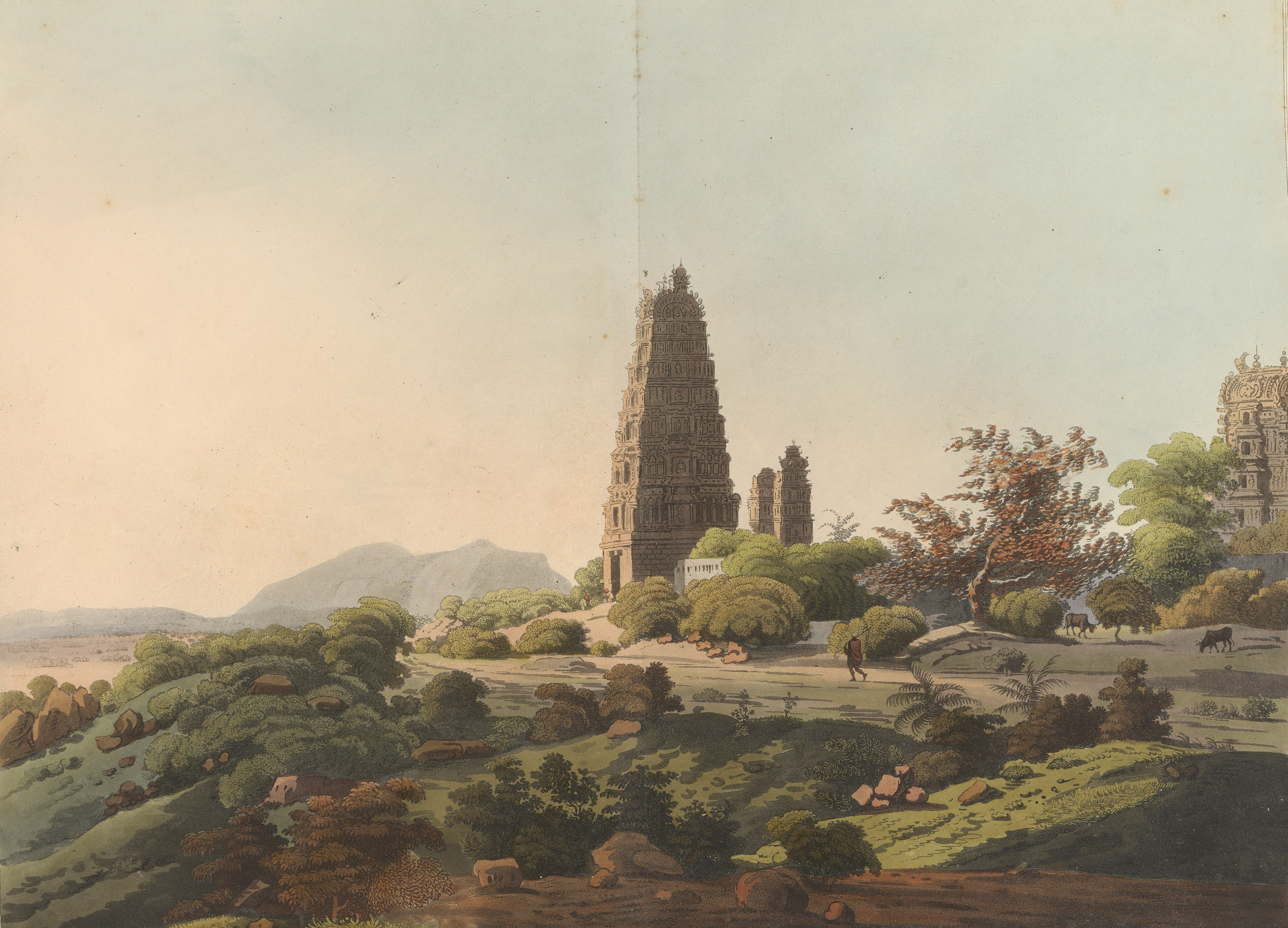
Pagodas at Maugry, with a distant view of Sewandroog, a print after Colebrook

It is thought that Colebrooke was born in Switzerland. His father Robert Colebrooke (1718 - 1784) was the British ambassador to the Swiss confederacy from 1762 to 1764 and his mother was Mary (née Williams). The father had to sell his property of Chilham Castle in 1774 to pay his creditors. Colebrooke joined the Bengal Infantry in 1778. T.D. Pearse trained and appointed him as Surveyor in 1783. Colebrooke surveyed the distance from Hooghly to Madras using a perambulator. Trained in topographical illustration and surveying he produced "Twelve views of places in the kingdom of Mysore" in 1794 based on his work in Mysore in 1790. He accompanied Archibald Blair to survey the Andaman Islands in 1789. Colebrooke Island and Passage were named after him. Colebrooke compiled a vocabulary of Andaman islanders in an article to the Asiatic Society of Bengal. He also described the volcanic Barren Island. After Alexander Kyd was moved to the Andamans as Superintendent of the settlement, the position of Surveyor General of Bengal became vacant and Colebrooke was appointed in 1794. He remained in this position he kept until his death from dysentery in 1808 on the way from Rohillakhand to Calcutta at Bhagalpur. Colebrooke was a cousin of the orientalist H.T. Colebrooke. He was promoted to Lieutenant in November 1778, Lt-Colonel in November 1803. Colebrooke took a special interest in the changing course of the Ganges river. One of Colebrooke's suggestions, made in 1795, was that by cutting a 20 foot wide and 15–20 foot deep canal between the Hurdum and Ichamati to connect the Churni River and the Ganges would make the river navigable for 155 miles and avoid the route through the Sunderbans. The idea was opposed by James Rennell who said:

Nature seems to have adjusted matters very nicely, in respect of the capacity of river beds and their levels; ... any tampering with them in delicate cases (particularly where there is so great a periodical swelling [in volume] and velocity of current) may be productive of much mischief.

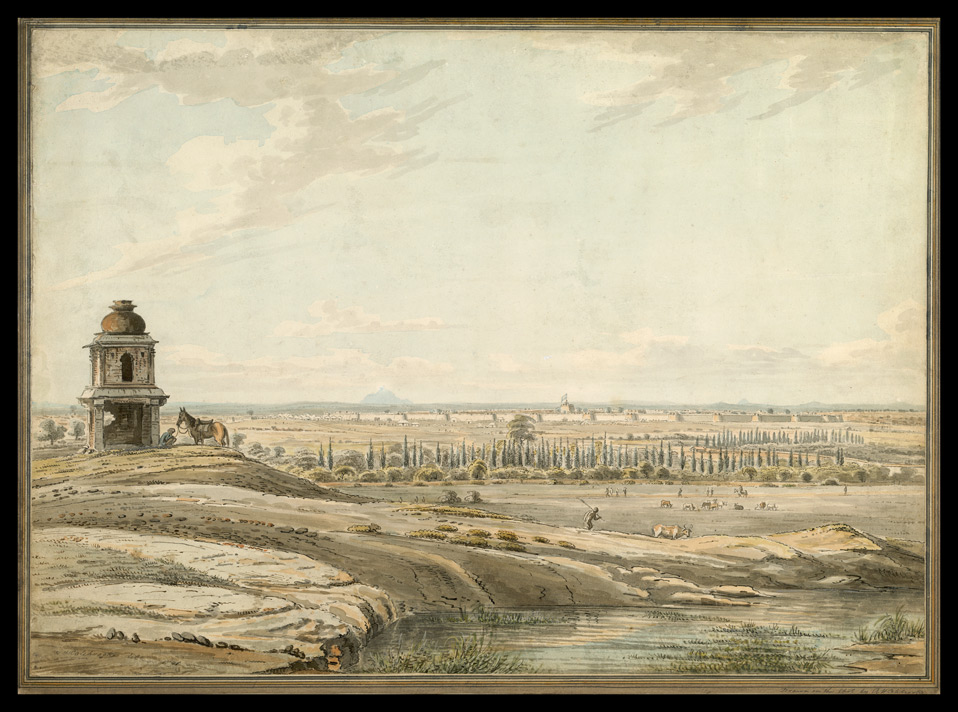
East view of Bangalore, a watercolour

A keen astronomer, Colebrooke also corresponded with John Goldingham at the Madras Observatory to establish the latitude of Calcutta. He was succeeded as Surveyor General by John Garstin.

== Personal life ==
Colebrooke married Charlotte Bristowe (died at Bath 2 July 1833) in Calcutta on 31 July 1795 and they had three daughters and two sons (both named Richard, one of whom born 30 December 1800 became an ensign in the Bengal infantry and died on 23 February 1868). As was common in the period, he also had illegitimate children from Indian mistresses. Colebrooke's brother James (1772-18 January 1816) worked in the Madras Infantry.
