= Sir Edward Colebrooke, 4th Baronet =

British politician (1813–1890)

Sir Edward Colebrooke Bt
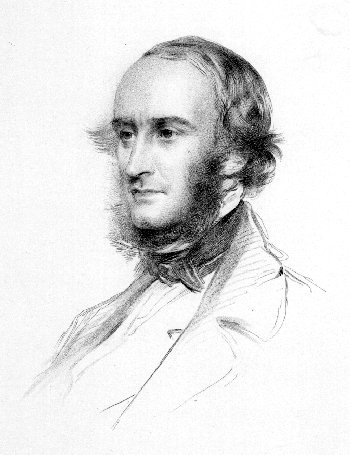

Member of Parliament for Taunton 1842–1852, Lanarkshire 1857–1868 and North Lanarkshire 1868–1885

Personal details
- Born: Thomas Edward Colebrooke; 19 August 1813 Calcutta, British India
- Died: 11 January 1890 (aged 76) London
- Party: Liberal
- Spouse: Elizabeth Margaret Richardson
- Children: 6 (1 died in infancy)
- Education: Eton College
- Profession: Politician

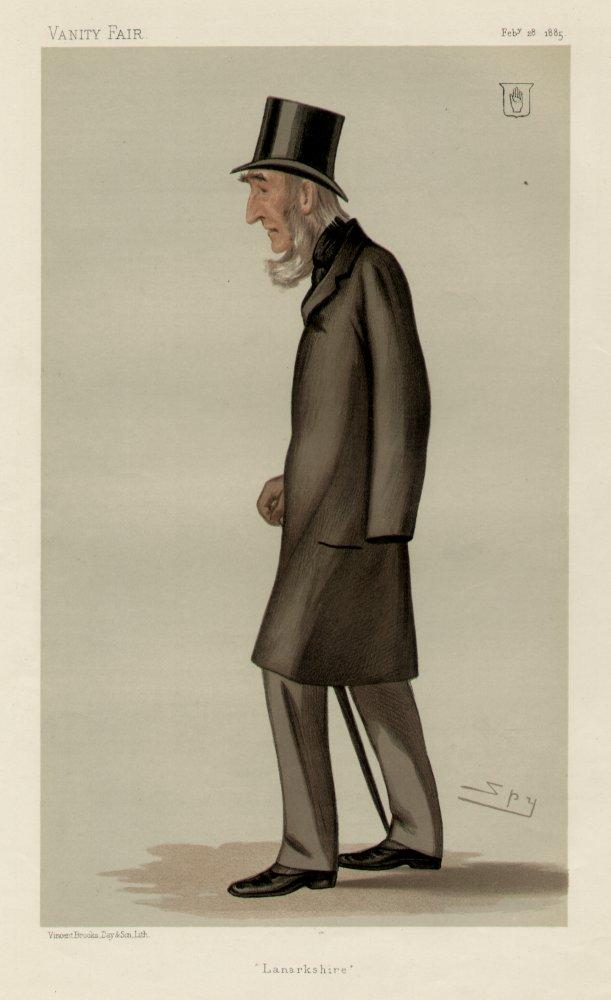
"Lanarkshire". Caricature by Spy published in Vanity Fair in 1885.

Sir Thomas Edward Colebrooke, 4th Baronet, DL (19 August 1813 – 11 January 1890), known as Sir Edward Colebrooke, was a British politician.

== Early life and education ==
Edward was born in Calcutta, the second son of Henry Thomas Colebrooke and Elizabeth (née Wilkinson) Colebrooke. He and his elder brother George Vernon went to Eton College. He then attended the East India Company College at Hertford Heath, Hertfordshire in preparation for appointment to a post in India with the East India Company.

== India ==
Colebrooke arrived in India in June 1832 and worked in Allahabad, leaving India on 9 October 1835 and arriving home in London in January 1836 to comfort his father following the unexpected death of his elder brother.

== Colebrooke baronetcy ==
Edward's brother George died on 9 February 1835 and his father in January 1837, leaving Edward heir to the Colebrooke baronetcy which he inherited in 1838 on the death of his uncle, Sir James Edward Colebrooke.

== Career ==
Colebrooke was Liberal Member of Parliament (MP) for Taunton 1842–1852, Lanarkshire 1857–1868 and North Lanarkshire 1868–1885. He stood unsuccessfully as a liberal Unionist of North East Lanarkshire in 1886.

He was Lord Lieutenant of Lanarkshire 1869–1890.

Colebrooke went to live in Ottershaw, Surrey in 1859. He provided sufficient land from his estate for a church, churchyard and vicarage, paid all the construction costs and endowed the church with £100 per year.

He was Dean of Faculties at the University of Glasgow from 1869 to 1872 and was awarded an honorary LLD in 1873.

He was President of the Royal Asiatic Society from 1864 to 1866, from 1875 to 1877 and in 1881.

== Marriage and family ==
He married Elizabeth Margaret Richardson, second daughter of John Richardson, at St Paul's Church, Knightsbridge, on 15 January 1857.

They had six children, of whom five survived into adulthood:

- Margaret Ginevra, born on 19 November 1857. She married the Marchese di Camugliano-Niccolini on 17 November 1890; they had no children
- Henry, born on 3 November 1858; died on 1 May 1859, to whom Christ Church, Ottershaw is believed to have been built as a memorial
- Helen Emma (known as Nelly), born in 1860; died on 21 January 1916.
- Edward Arthur (known as Ned), born on 12 October 1861, who after his father's death in 1890 inherited the baronetcy
- Mary Elizabeth (known as Molly), born on 21 May 1863; died on 2 October 1951. She married Edmund Henry Byng on 17 December 1894 and they had two children
- Roland, born on 22 July 1864; died on 19 January 1910.

== Death ==
Sir Edward Colebroke died on 11 January 1890 at his London home, aged 76. His wife, Lady Elizabeth, died on 26 October 1896.

== Sources ==
- Binns, Sheila (2014): Sir Edward Colebrooke of Abington and Ottershaw, Baronet and Member of Parliament: The Four Lives of an Extraordinary Victorian, Grosvenor House Publishing Ltd, ISBN 978 17814 86948

Parliament of the United Kingdom
Preceded by Edward Thomas Bainbridge; Henry Labouchere	Member of Parliament for Taunton; 1842–1852; With: Henry Labouchere	Succeeded by Arthur Mills; Henry Labouchere
Preceded by Alexander Baillie-Cochrane	Member of Parliament for Lanarkshire; 1857–1868	Constituency abolished
New constituency	Member of Parliament for North Lanarkshire; 1868–1885	Succeeded by Robert McLaren
Honorary titles
Preceded by Lord Belhaven and Stenton	Lord Lieutenant of Lanarkshire; 1869–1890	Succeeded by The Earl of Home
Baronetage of Great Britain
Preceded by James Edward Colebrooke	Baronet (of Fairwarp, Kent); 1838–1890	Succeeded by Edward Colebrooke, 1st Baron Colebrooke
