= George Colebrooke =

British merchant, banker and politician (1729–1809)

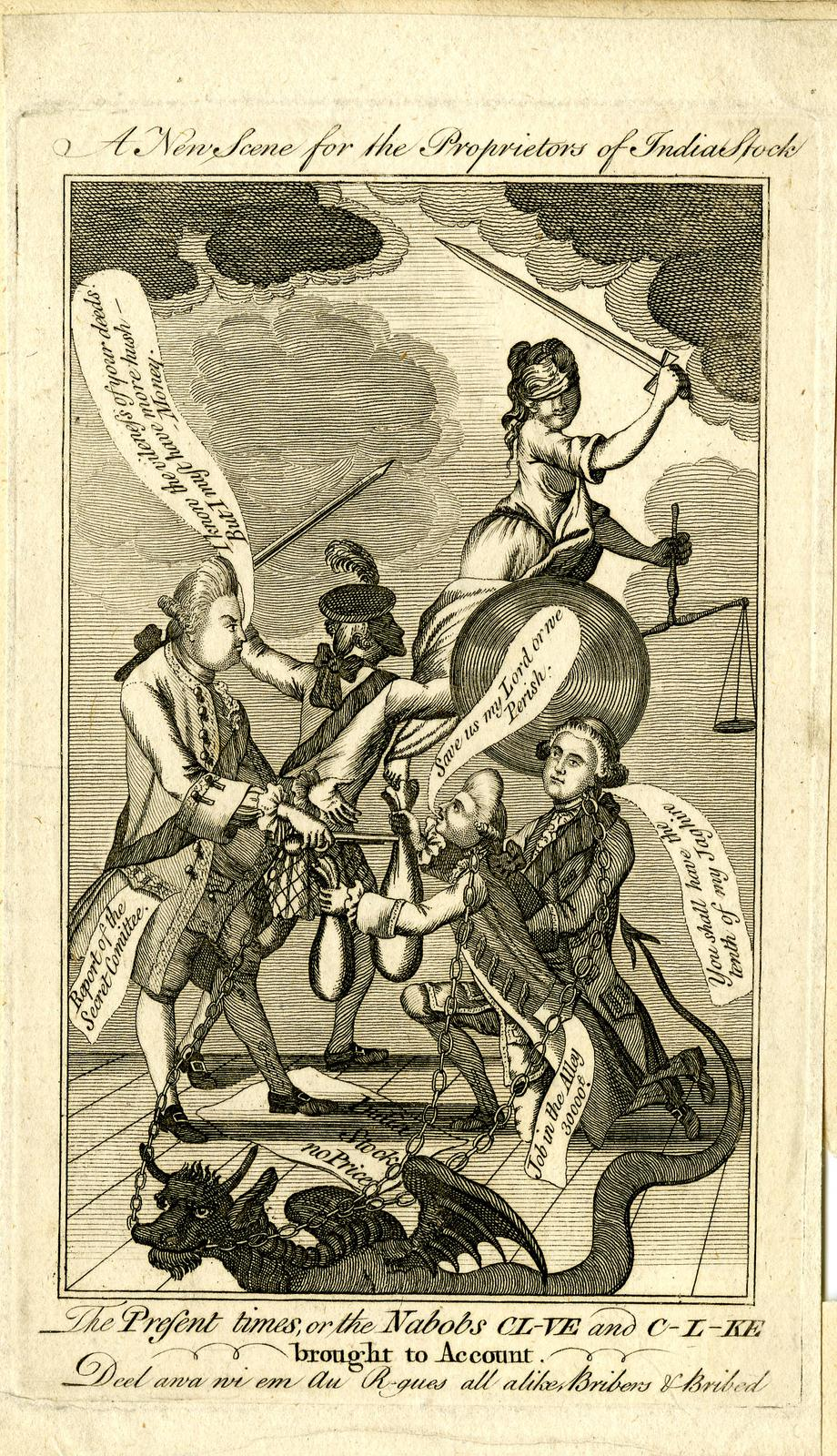
A 1773 political cartoon featuring Colebrooke (second from right)

Sir George Colebrooke, 2nd Baronet (14 June 1729 – 5 August 1809) - also known as Sir George Colebroke - was a British merchant, banker and politician who sat in the British House of Commons from 1754 to 1774, representing the constituency of Arundel. Born in Chilham, Kent, he was also a stockjobber and nabob with close ties to Robert Clive and Alexander Fordyce who thrice served as the chairman of the East India Company in 1769, 1770 and 1772 respectively. His financial activities, which included the ownership of slave plantations in the West Indies, resulted in Colebrooke coming into the possession of a large fortune; however, he went bankrupt through poor speculations during the British credit crisis of 1772–1773.

== Early life ==
George Colebrooke was born on 14 June 1729 in Chilham, Kent, the third son of London banker James Colebrooke. He was educated at Leiden University around 1745, alongside John Wilkes and Charles Townshend. He acquired Arnos Grove house in 1752 on the death of his father.

His older brothers were Robert Colebrooke and James Colebrooke. Robert was Member for Maldon, Essex from 1741 to 1761. In 1751 James bought control of one seat in the rotten borough, Gatton in Surrey, for £23,000, and was sitting in Parliament. From 1754 the brothers were at first Opposition Whigs, but switched support to the Duke of Newcastle's government and were rewarded in 1759 with the creation of a baronetcy for James (who had daughters but no son) and a special remainder of the baronetcy to George. When James died, and Robert was appointed as ambassador to Switzerland, George inherited both the baronetcy, Gatton Park and the Lordship of the Manor at Gatton with its guaranteed control of one of the parliamentary seats there. He had Gatton Park landscaped by Capability Brown between 1762 and 1768. He offered Jean Jacques Rousseau to live on his estate.

== Career ==
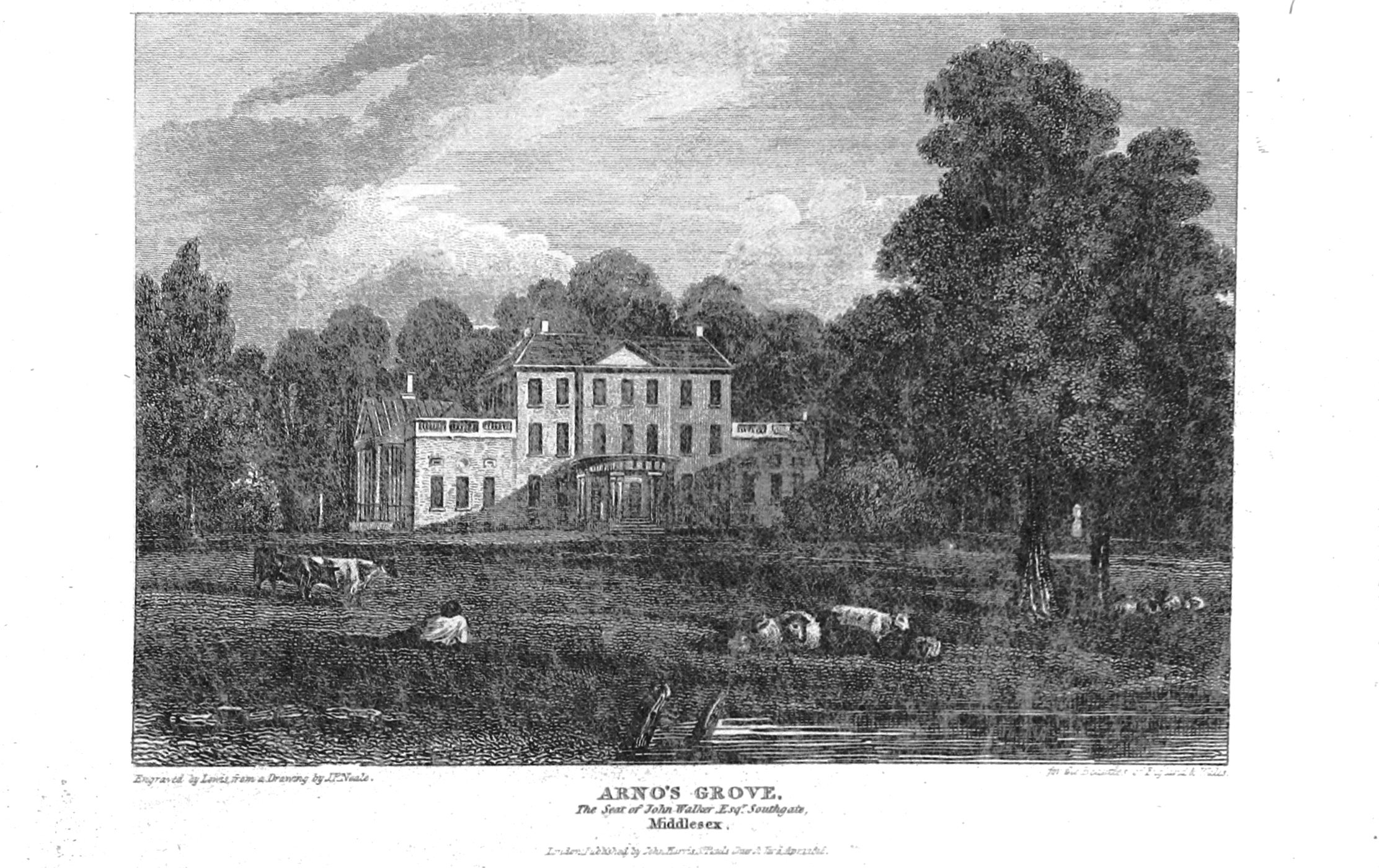
Arnos Grove house in 1816

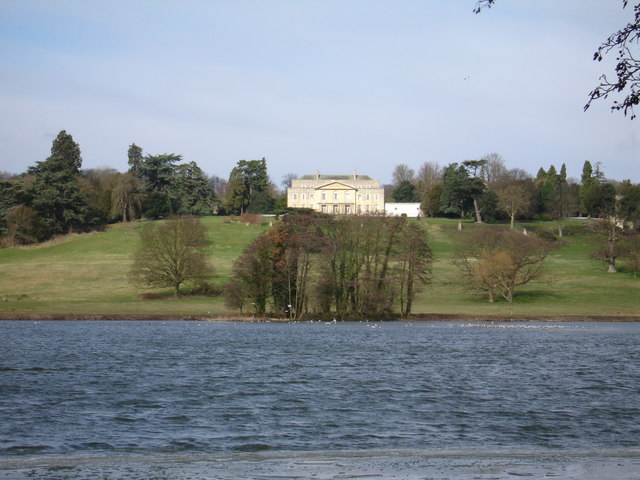
Gatton House in Gatton Park

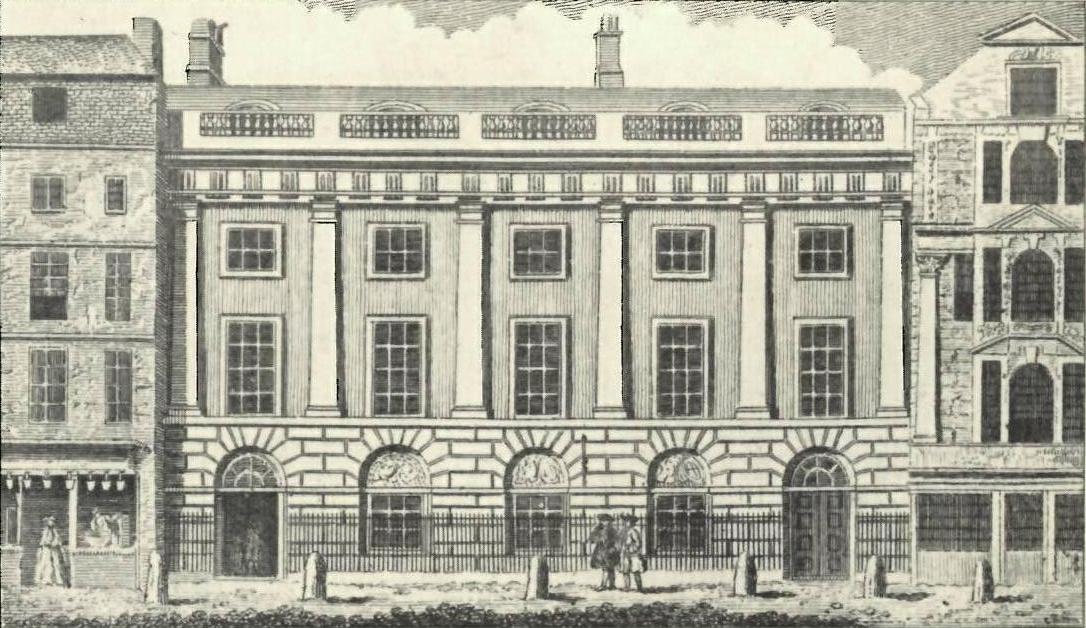
Engraving of East India House, Leadenhall Street (1766)

In 1761 George was left in sole charge of the family bank in Threadneedle Street, and invested some of his wealth in buying up control of the borough of Arundel in Sussex, where the family lived. Arundel was not a classic pocket borough, where the power to return MPs was literally tied to property rights that could be freely bought and sold, but a thoroughly corrupt one where bribery was routine and where maintaining influence of the elections required constant expenditure. Nevertheless, Colebrooke kept control for twenty years, sitting himself as Arundel's MP from 1754 to 1774 and for most of the period being able to choose also who held the other seat.

More valuably, however, Colebrooke's support for Newcastle ensured his eligibility for lucrative government contracts. By 1762, he held two of these contracts, one for remitting money to the British forces in the American colonies and the other for victualling the troops there. But with Newcastle's fall from power in that year, Colebrooke was immediately ejected from one contract by the new government, and the other was not renewed when it expired in 1765. Though offered compensation or new contracts on the formation of the Rockingham government, he preferred instead to accept a well-paid post as chirographer to the Court of Common Pleas. From this point onwards although he retained his seat in Parliament he was rarely active there.

In 1764, he became a partner in a Dublin bank. Colebrooke's business interests were diverse. He speculated in land, purchasing large estates in Lanarkshire and slave plantations in Antigua (where his wife already had interests), Grenada and Dominica. He was also a member of a syndicate to settle the Ohio Valley in 1768, and had interests in New England. (Colebrook, New Hampshire is named in his honour.) Two interests in particular, however, led to his eventual downfall: his involvement in the East India Company and his speculations in raw materials.

By 1771, Colebrooke clearly desired a new interior decorative scheme for 23 Arlington Street, and he hired Robert Adam to produce designs for at least seven rooms, and a selection of furniture. It is unlikely that any of Adam's designs for Colebrooke were completed owing to the start of his financial problems at around the same time.

== 1773 ==
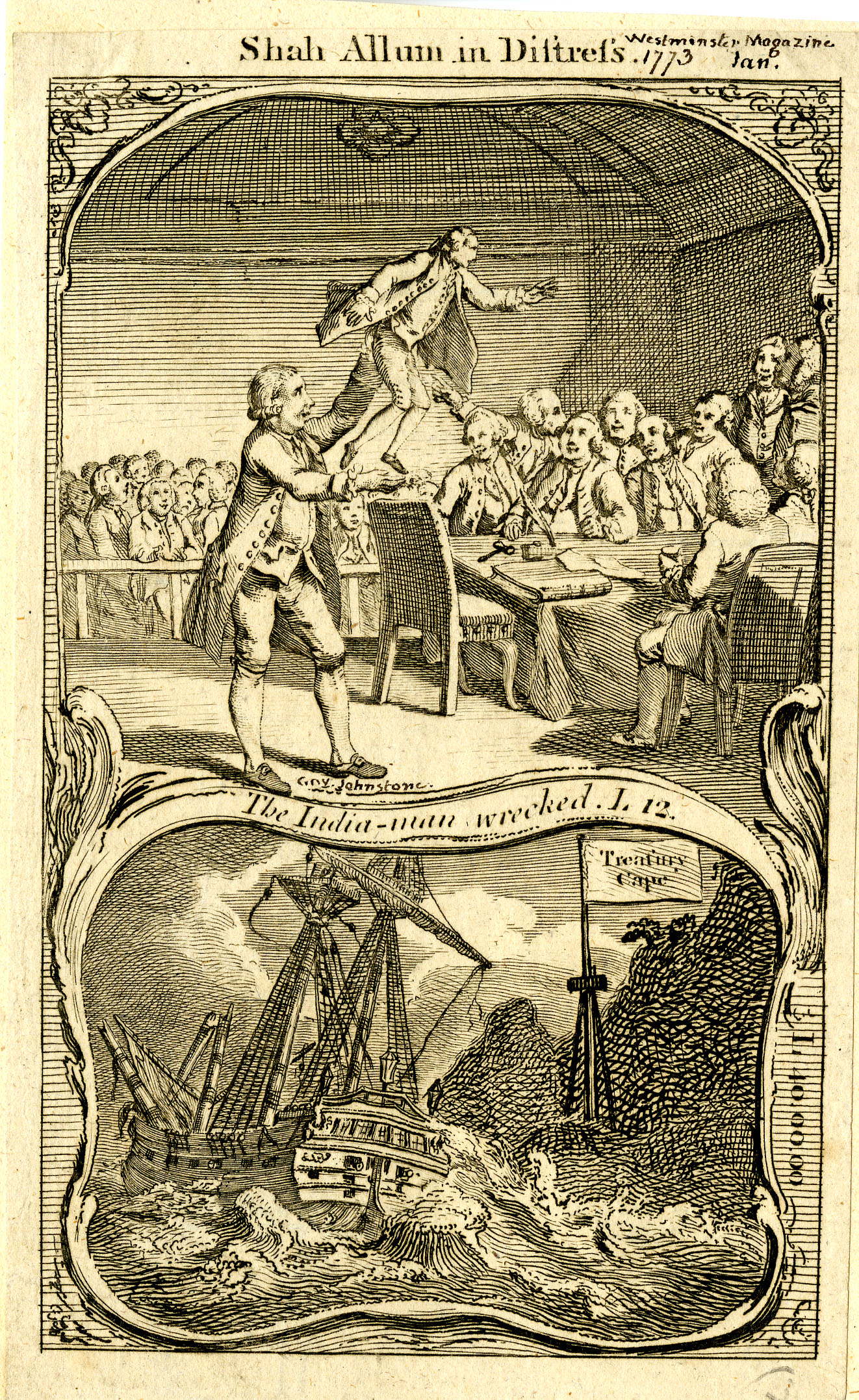
Shah Allum in distress; representation of Sir George Colebrooke

Colebrooke was a full-time director of the East India Company from 1767 to 1771, deputy chairman from 1768 to 1769 and was elected chairman three times, in 1769, 1770 and 1772. His final year in office was a disastrous one: the company got into financial difficulties (which led to the passing of the Regulating Act 1773), he was accused of speculating in its stock while chairman, and was left heavily in debt to a number of the other leading figures in the company, partly through arrangements to procure votes in the company's elections. (In 1771 he, Sir William Pulteney and Sir James Cockburn recruited Paul Wentworth (spy) borrowed £66,000 together from Hope & Co.) He lost much larger sums, however, speculating on raw materials - hemp, flax, lead, logwood and alum, and the fall or rises of the market value of EIC-stocks. In 1771 he lost £190,000 dealing in hemp; from 1772 he was attempting to corner the world's supply of alum, buying up mines in Yorkshire and Lancashire, and saw much of the remainder of his fortune swallowed up when the market collapsed as part of the financial crisis of 1772.

At first, Colebrooke was able to stay in business with assistance from the Bank of England, but his bank temporarily stopped payment on 31 March 1773, and permanently (after three years in the control of trustees appointed by his creditors) on 7 August 1776. Most of his property, including his share in the rotten borough at Gatton and art collection, was sold in 1774 to meet his liabilities, and a commission of bankruptcy was taken out against him in 1777. Yet at the same period he was spending considerable sums on the rebuilding of his London house at 32 Soho Square. The mansion was sold to Sir Joseph Banks in 1779.

== Later life ==
Between 1777 and 1778, he retired to Boulogne-sur-Mer, so poor that the East India Company had to vote him a pension, but later moved to Soissons, after Robert died. In 1789, during the French Revolution, he returned to England and managed eventually to pay his creditors in full so that some inheritance was left for his descendants. He played a prominent role in Bath, Somerset, particularly in the philanthropic arena.

== Marriage ==
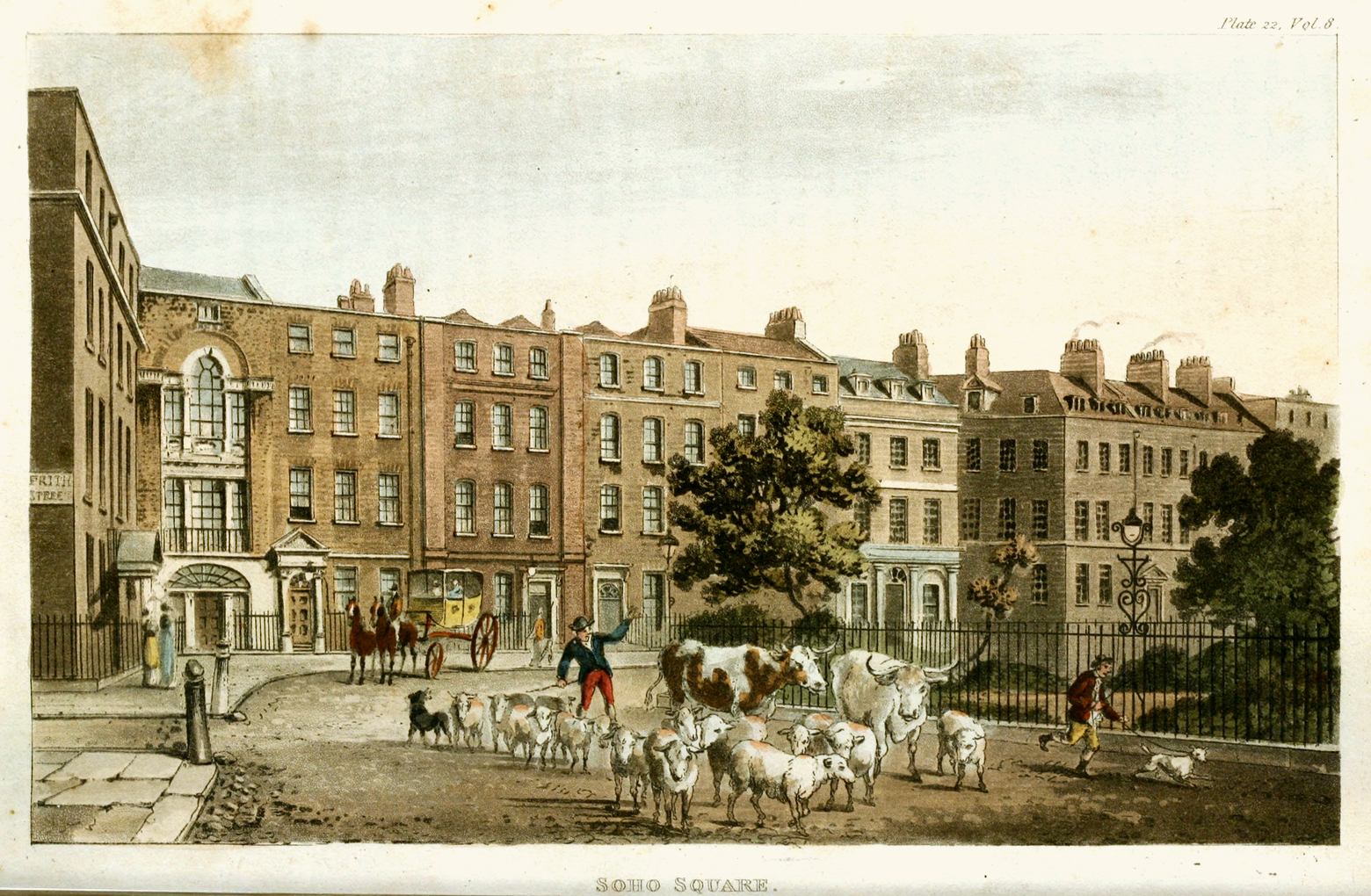
Soho Square, from Ackermann's Repository of Arts, 1812

He had married Mary Gayner, daughter of Peter Gayner of Antigua, in 1754, and they had three sons and three daughters:

- Mary Colebrooke (born 1757-d.20 Dec 1813) married 1) Chevalier de Peyron [died 1784] (parents of Charles Adolphus Peyron (1780–1807); married 2) William Traill [1759-1842(?)](graduate of Harvard 1777); parents of British diplomat George William Traill (1792–1847)
- George Colebrooke (1759–1809)
- James Edward Colebrooke (1761–1838), and succeeded to the baronetcy
- Harriet Colebrooke (1762–1785)
- Louisa Colebrooke (born 1764)
- Professor Henry Thomas Colebrooke (1765–1837)

He also raised his brother James' two daughters, Mary and Emma Colebrook from 1761 until they were married.

== References and sources ==
Sources

- Edward Kimber and Richard Johnson, The Baronetage of England (London, 1771) The Baronetage of England: Containing a Genealogical and Historical Account of All the English Baronets Now Existing ... Illustrated with Their Coats of Arms ... To which is Added an Account of Such Nova Scotia Baronets as are of English Families; and a Dictionary of Heraldry ... by E. Kimber and R. Johnson
- Survey of London: volumes 33 and 34: St Anne Soho (1966), online at www.british-history.ac.uk
- Leigh Rayment's list of baronets

Parliament of Great Britain
Preceded by Theobald Taafe; Garton Orme	Member of Parliament for Arundel; 1754–1774; With: Thomas Griffin 1754–1761; John Bristow 1761–1768; Lauchlin Macleane 1768–1771; John Stewart 1771–1774	Succeeded by Thomas Brand; George Newnham
Baronetage of Great Britain
Preceded by James Colebrooke	Baronet (of Gatton); 1761–1809	Succeeded by James Edward Colebrooke
