= John Stewart (Arundel MP) =

British politician

John Stewart (c. 1723 – 1 April 1781) was a British politician and merchant who represented Arundel in the House of Commons of Great Britain from 1771 to 1774. The son of Archibald Stewart and his wife Grizel Gordon, Stewart worked as a wine merchant in addition to sitting in the House of Commons. Arundel having two members of parliament at the time, Stewart's tenure overlapped with that of George Colebrooke, many of whose "multifarious affairs" he had been managing since at least 1766.
