= Kimpton, Hertfordshire =

Village and parish in Hertfordshire, England

Coordinates: 51°51′N 0°17′W

Kimpton
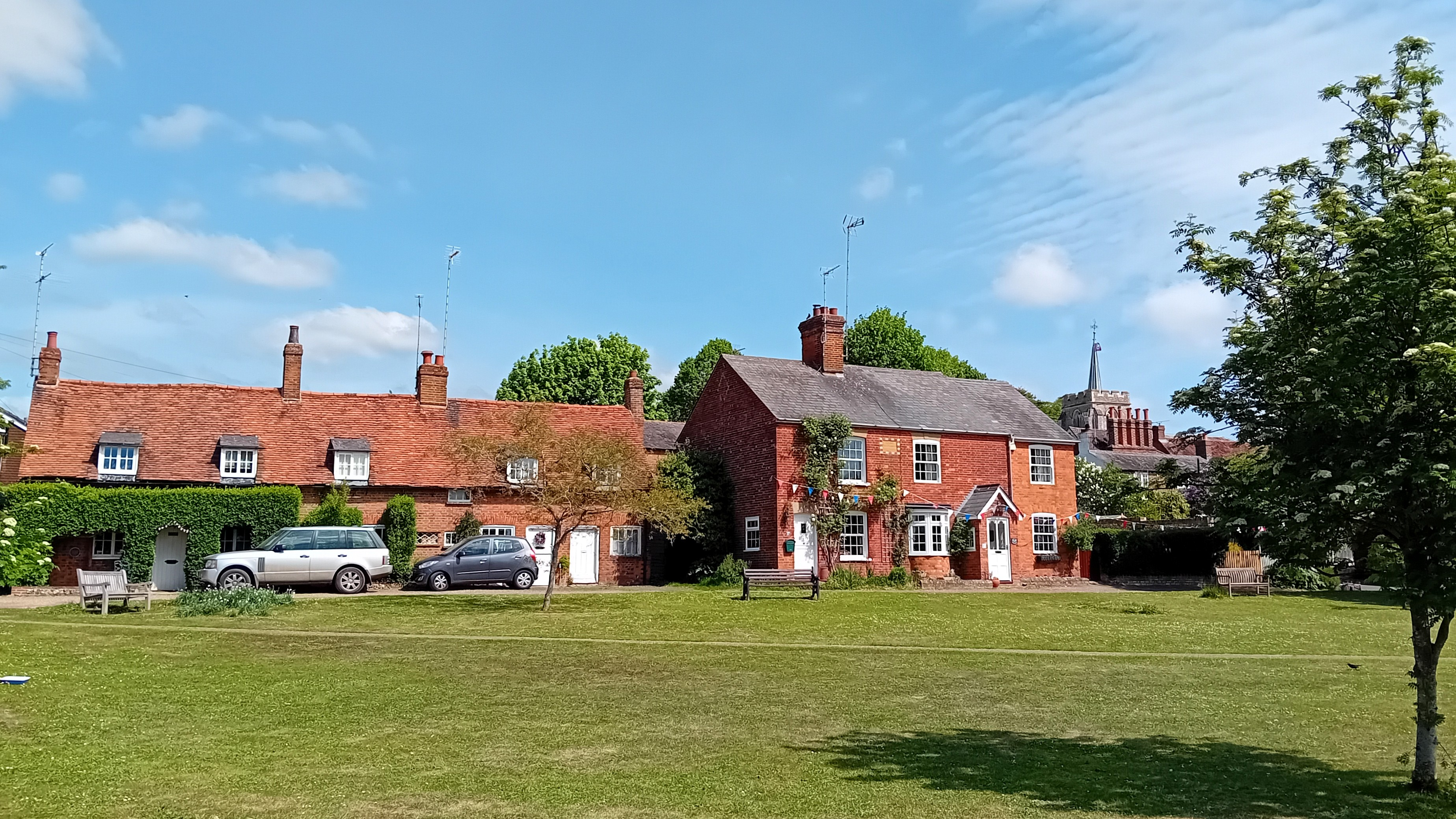
- The Green at Kimpton
- Population: 2,261 (Parish, 2021)
  - London: 25 mi (40 km)
- Civil parish: Kimpton
- District: North Hertfordshire
- Shire county: Hertfordshire
- Region: East
- Country: England
- Sovereign state: United Kingdom
- Post town: Hitchin
- Postcode district: SG4
- Police: Hertfordshire
- Fire: Hertfordshire
- Ambulance: East of England
- UK Parliament: Hitchin

Kimpton is a village and civil parish in the North Hertfordshire district of Hertfordshire, England. It lies 6 miles (10 km) south of Hitchin, its post town, 7 miles (11 km) north of St Albans and 4 miles (6 km) from both Harpenden and Luton. As well as the village itself, the parish also contains the hamlets of Peters Green and Blackmore End and surrounding rural areas. The population of the parish was 2,261 at the 2021 census.

== History ==
Kimpton is mentioned in the Domesday Book: "In the Half-Hundred of HITCHIN 24 Ralph holds KIMPTON from the Bishop. It answers for 4 hides. Land for 10 ploughs. In Lordship 2; a third possible. 2 Frenchmen and 12 villagers with 2 smallholders have 7 ploughs. 3 cottagers; 5 slaves. Meadow for 6 oxen; woodland, 800 pigs; 1 mill at 8s. The total value is and was £12; before 1066 £15. Aelfeva, mother of Earl Morcar, held this manor."

The manor was later held by the Hoo-Keate family, and then by marriage to the Dacre family.

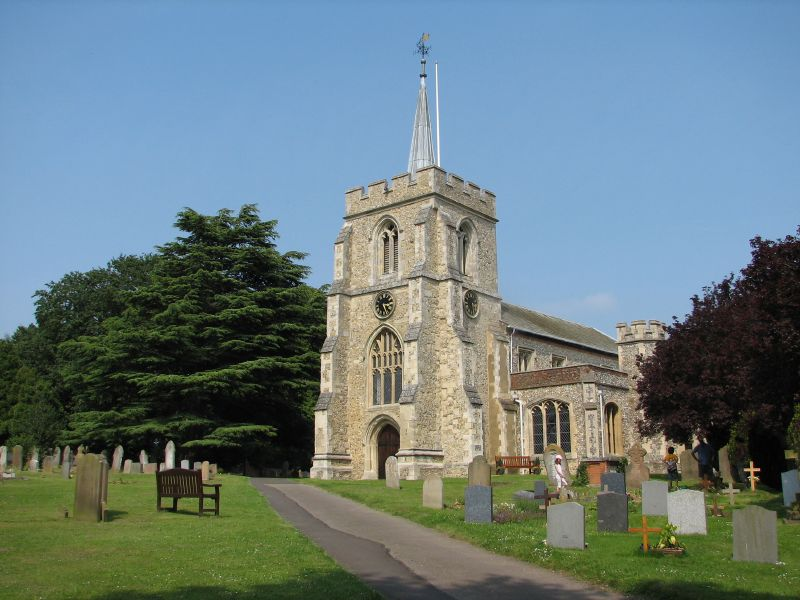
Parish church of St. Peter and St. Paul, Kimpton, Hertfordshire

Kimpton's parish church, dedicated to St Peter and St Paul, dates back to circa 1200. It is a spacious flint-built building in the unusual transitional style between Norman and Early English. The Dacre Chapel has a fine Perpendicular screen, and the remains of early wall paintings in the chancel show St Christopher and the Seven Corporal Works of Mercy. The belfry contains a peal of eight bells, the oldest having been cast c. 1390.

=== The Kimpton Flood ===
In February 2001, Kimpton was hit by flooding due to an unprecedented amount of rainfall. The dried up river Kym, which was now a vital road, emerged again and followed its natural course from Netherfield Springs, through Kimpton and joined the Mimram at Kimpton Mill. The situation became fairly serious on the 24th when business owners from the industrial estate on Claggy Road and also residents at risk hired pumps and called the fire brigade to try to deal with the 1-metre-deep water flow. The total cost of the damage caused by the flood was approximately £500,000. There is evidence suggesting that this is not the only flood to occur in the history of the village. There was a BBC news report on the situation.

== Geography ==
The village lies along the valley of a dried-up river bed and is about one mile long. Some of the houses on the High Street date back to the 16th century, but most are 19th and early 20th century. Behind the High Street are two large housing estates built in the 1970s, as well as another estate built in the 2010s located further west.

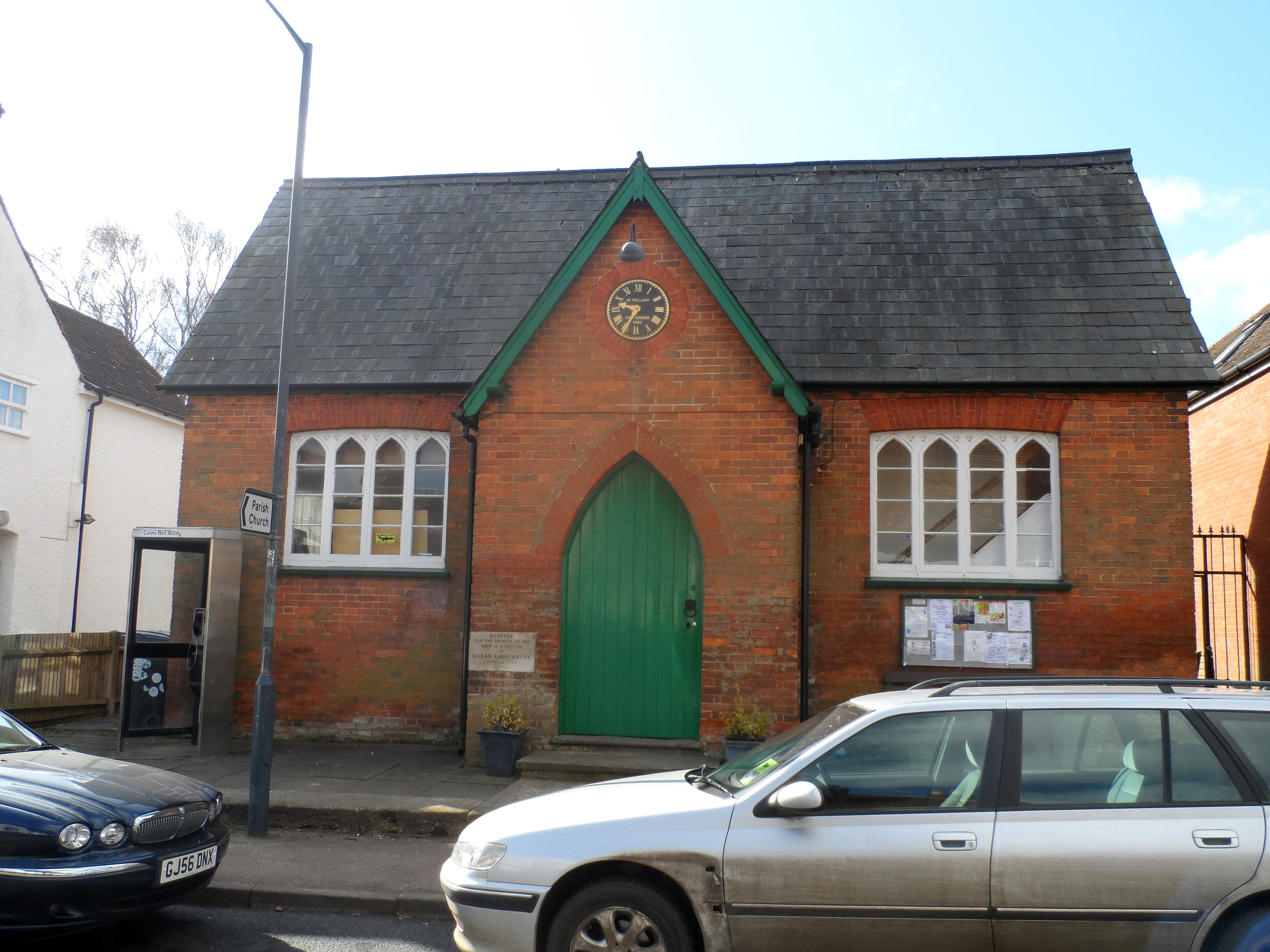
Dacre Rooms, High Street

The village has a primary and nursery school with over 150 children. The Dacre Rooms on High Street were donated to the village in 1879 by Susan, Lady Dacre, and are used as an events venue. The main village hall is now a modern building called the Memorial Hall on Hall Lane.

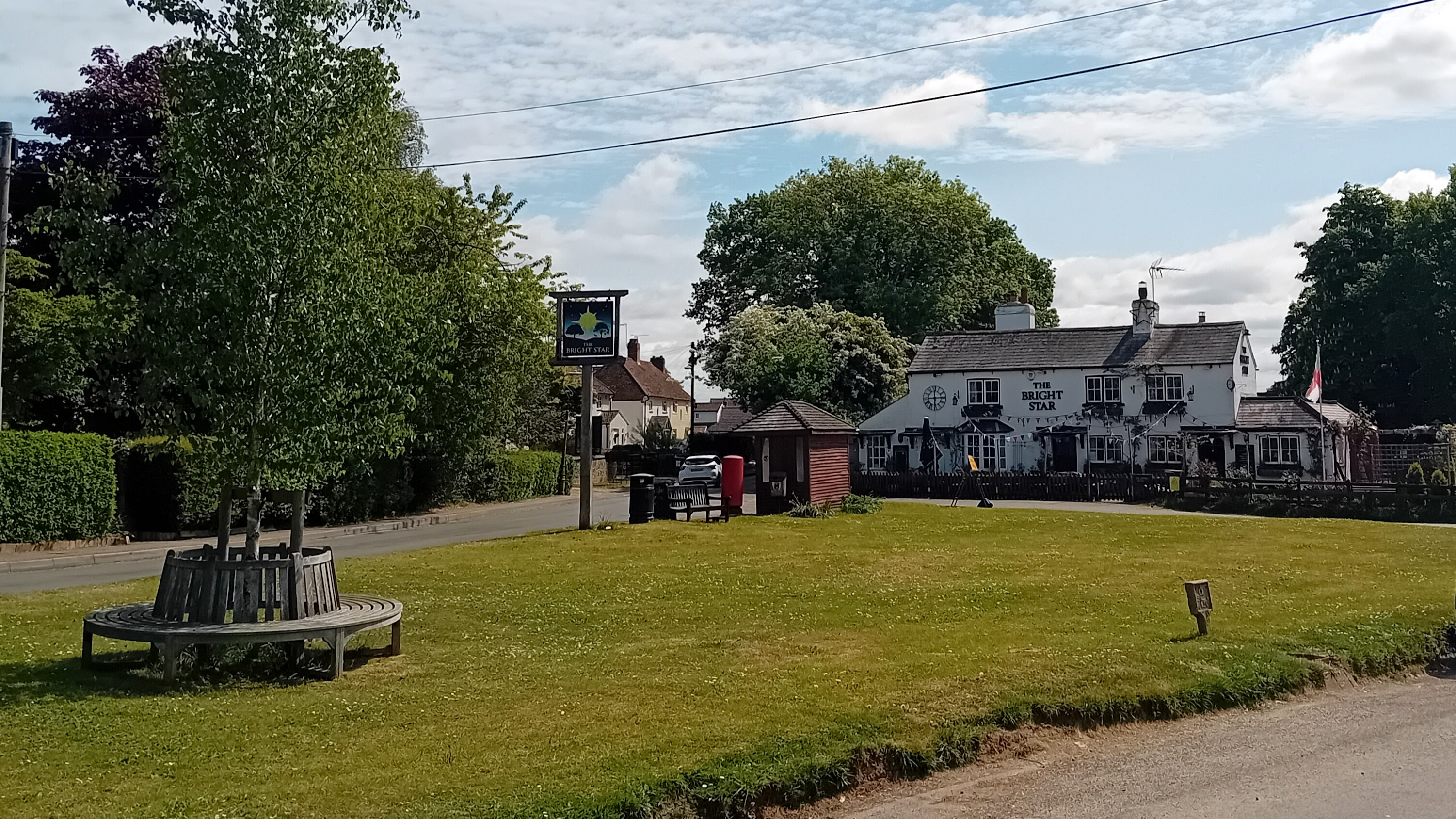
The Bright Star and the green at Peters Green

As well as Kimpton village, the parish also includes the hamlets of Peters Green and Blackmore End and surrounding rural areas, both sitting above the valley Kimpton is in.

== Governance ==
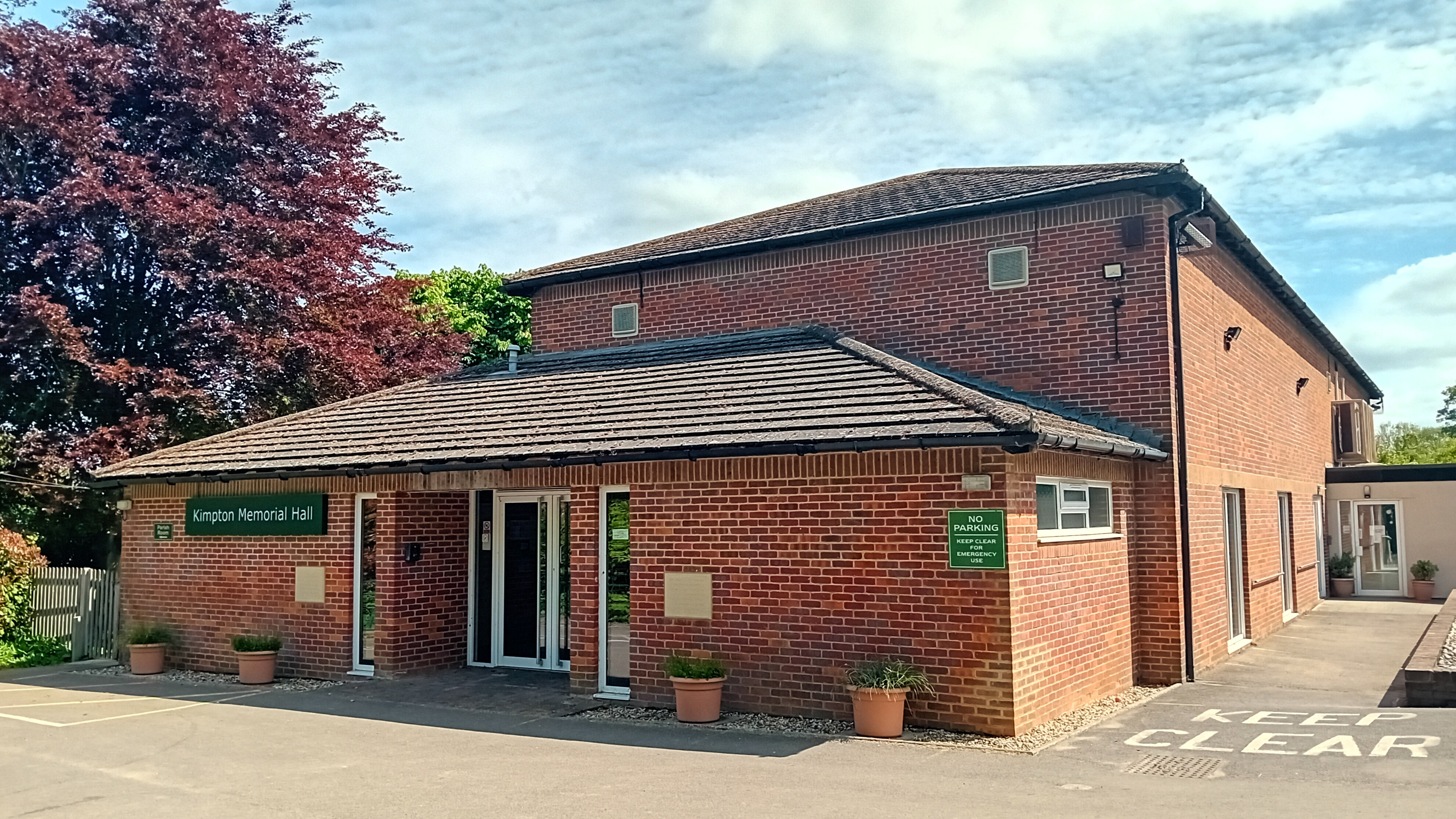
Kimpton Memorial Hall

There are three tiers of local government covering Kimpton, at parish, district, and county level: Kimpton Parish Council, North Hertfordshire District Council, and Hertfordshire County Council. The parish council generally meets at the Memorial Hall.
