= James Colebrooke =

English politician (1722–1761)

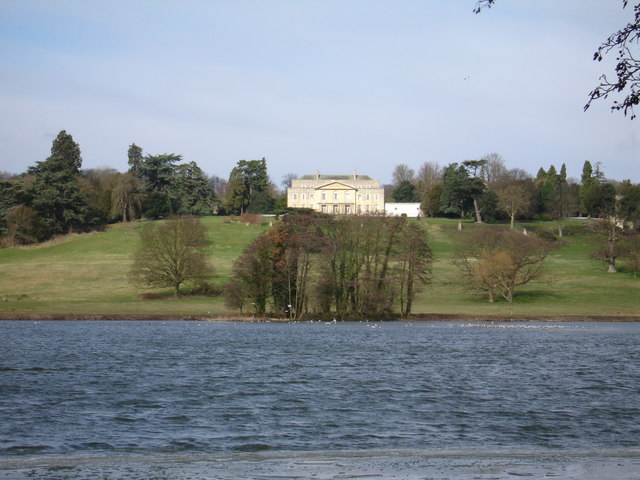
Gatton House in Gatton Park

Sir James Edward Colebrooke, 1st Baronet (21 July 1722 — 10 May 1761) sat in the House of Commons from 1751 to 1761.

== Early life ==
He was the son of James Colebrooke, of Chilham Castle, Kent, a very prominent private banker in London, and his wife Mary Hudson. He and his brother George were educated at Leiden University; on his return to Britain, he married Mary Skynner, daughter and co-heiress of Stephen Skynner of Walthamstow, Essex, and Mary Remington, in May 1747.

== Career ==
Shortly thereafter he bought Gatton Park from William Newland, with the proprietorship of the borough of Gatton, and the privilege of sending two members to the House of Commons. He duly exercised the privilege, sitting in the House of Commons from 1751 to 1761.

Sir James was invested as a Knight and was created 1st Baronet Colebrooke, of Gatton, county Surrey (Great Britain) on 12 October 1759, with a special remainder to his brother, George. He left two daughters, Emma, Lady Tankerville who was a botanist and Mary (1750–1781), who married Sir John Aubrey, 6th Baronet. On his death in 1761 the baronetcy and Gatton Park passed to his brother George.

== Notes ==
Parliament of Great Britain
Preceded by Charles Knowles; Paul Humphrey	Member of Parliament for Gatton; 1751–1761; With: Charles Knowles 1751–1752; William Bateman 1752–1754; Thomas Brand 1754–1761	Succeeded by Thomas Brand; Edward Harvey
Baronetage of Great Britain
New creation	Baronet (of Gatton); 1759–1761	Succeeded by George Colebrooke
