= Henry Meux =

Henry Meux may refer to:

- Sir Henry Meux, 1st Baronet (1770–1841), of the Meux Baronets, British brewer
- Sir Henry Meux, 2nd Baronet (1817–1883), British brewer and politician, son of the above
- Henry Bruce Meux (1856–1900), British brewer, son of the above and husband of Valerie, Lady Meux
