= Ellen Beach Yaw =

American opera singer (1869–1947)

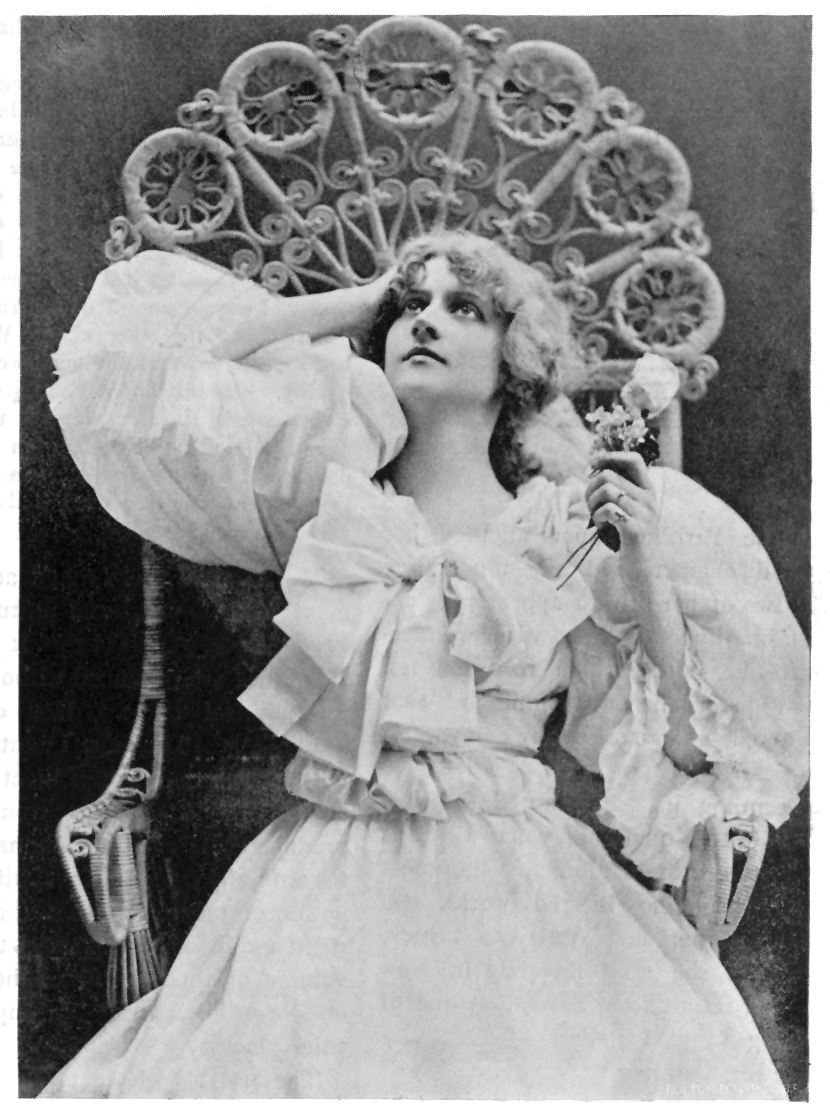
Ellen Beach Yaw in 1895

Ellen Beach Yaw (September 14, 1869 – September 9, 1947) was an American coloratura soprano, best known for her concert career and extraordinary vocal range, and for originating the title role in Arthur Sullivan's comic opera The Rose of Persia (1899).

After she undertook American and European concert tours in 1894 and 1895, Yaw was heard by Sullivan at a private concert in London and arranged for her to be cast as the lead in The Rose of Persia. Yaw received mixed reviews in the role, and Helen Carte dismissed her after less than two weeks. After further vocal studies, Yaw made her grand opera debut as Ophelia in Ambroise Thomas's Hamlet in Nice, France, in 1903 or 1904. She eventually performed about 18 leading opera roles. In 1908, she gave a single performance of the title role in Lucia di Lammermoor at the Metropolitan Opera House in New York, her only appearance there. She continued to perform on concert tours and at charitable benefits for the next several decades.

== Early life and career ==
Yaw was born on September 14, 1869, in the small town of Boston, south of Buffalo, New York. She was the youngest child of Ambrose Spencer Yaw, who manufactured cow and sheep bells, and Mary Jane Yaw (née Beach), both of whom had some musical ability. Her father died when she was young, and the family moved west, first to Minnesota, and eventually to California.

Yaw began to sing at an early age, but her early musical education was intermittent. She was taught first by her mother, and then by a succession of teachers in New York, Massachusetts, and Minnesota, with whom she could afford only brief lessons, which she paid for partly by singing and partly by working as a secretary. As she recalled in an interview in 1899, "I was very poor, and could only afford to take quite a few lessons at a time. Then I had to sing so as to make enough money to pay for the next course, and so on." In the early 1890s she moved to back to New York to study with Hervor Anna Sofia Torpadie, the wife of tenor Theodore Bjorksten, and in 1893 she traveled with Torpadie to Paris, where she took lessons from Enrico delle Sedie and Saint-Yves Bax, and subsequently from Alberto Randegger in London. At this point she began to perform more regularly, with American and European concert tours in 1894 and 1895 and appearances at Carnegie Hall in New York in January 1896.

=== Vocal range ===
Yaw was best known for her remarkable vocal range, which was widely reported to extend from the G below middle C to the E above high E, a span of more than three-and-a-half octaves. She was also able to trill in major thirds or fifths (trills usually involve rapidly alternating notes over an interval of a minor or major second). During the 1890s her manager, Victor Thrane, began to promote her as the singer with the highest range in history, and contemporary American press accounts describe her as a home-grown prodigy whose vocal gifts exceeded those of famous European singers such as Christina Nilsson, Adelina Patti, and Lucrezia Aguiari. Some critics, however, observed that her highest notes were "little more than squeaks", and Yaw herself, in an interview with The New York Times in 1908, admitted as much: "I sing the E an octave above the E over high C. But of course, I can't give much musical value to a note as high as that. It must be quick and staccato. But the G above high C I can hold."

=== The Rose of Persia ===
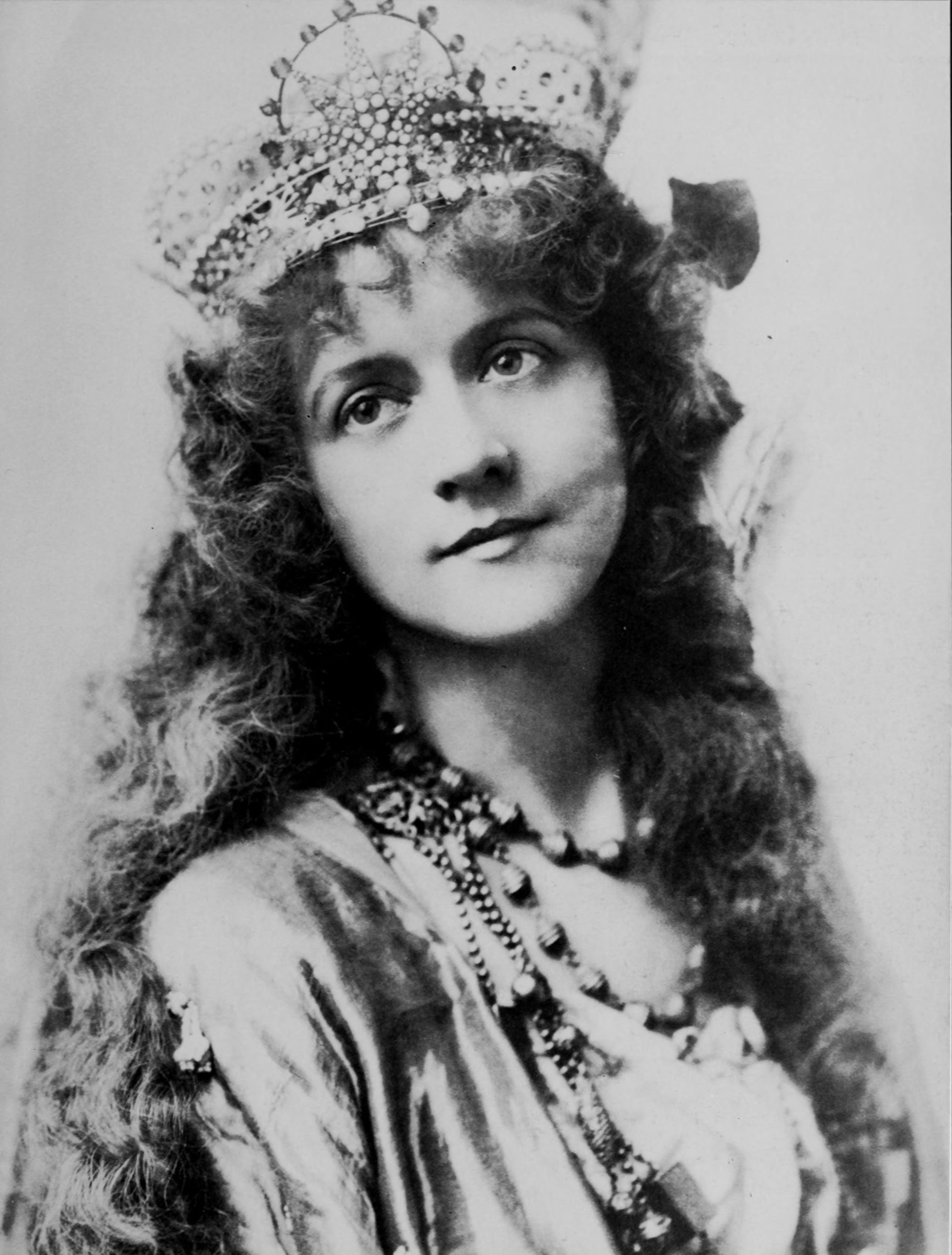
Ellen Beach Yaw as Sultana Zubedyah in The Rose of Persia (1899)

In 1898 and 1899, Yaw was singing in private concerts in London, and at one of these, at the home of Mrs. Fanny Ronalds, Sir Arthur Sullivan heard her and arranged for her to be cast as the leading role, Sultana Zubedyah, in his comic opera The Rose of Persia, which opened on November 29, 1899, at the Savoy Theatre in London. Sullivan wrote a special cadenza for her song "'Neath My Lattice" that was so high that only she could sing it. Yaw had difficulty in the role the first two nights of the production, though the reviews were mixed, and both the music director, Francois Cellier, and Mrs. Carte advocated for her replacement.

Sullivan wrote in his diary on December 2, 1898, "I told [Cellier] I was afraid [that Yaw] would not improve, that she hadn’t got it in her", but noted, "I don’t quite see what it’s all about – Miss Yaw is not keeping people out of the theatre as Cellier and the Cartes imply." By December 10, however, he wrote in his diary that Yaw was "improving rapidly" and "sang the song really superbly: brilliant. So I wrote again to Mrs. Carte saying that I thought if we let Miss Yaw go it would be another mistake." It was too late, however, and the next day Yaw stopped at Sullivan's flat to tell him that she had been dismissed summarily by Mrs. Carte (ostensibly on account of illness). She was replaced in the role by Isabel Jay.

=== Further study and opera performances in Europe ===
Yaw's performances in London attracted the attention of Valerie Meux, the wealthy wife of brewing magnate Henry Bruce Meux. Meux became Yaw's patron, paying her expenses and sending her to Paris to study for three years with the Mathilde Marchesi, one of the foremost singing teachers in Europe. Yaw later spoke of Meux as her "fairy godmother", and in 1908 there were rumors in the press that Meux was contemplating making Yaw her heir. According to some later reports, she did in fact inherit a substantial sum from Meux, which she invested in real estate and citrus groves near her retirement home in Covina, California.

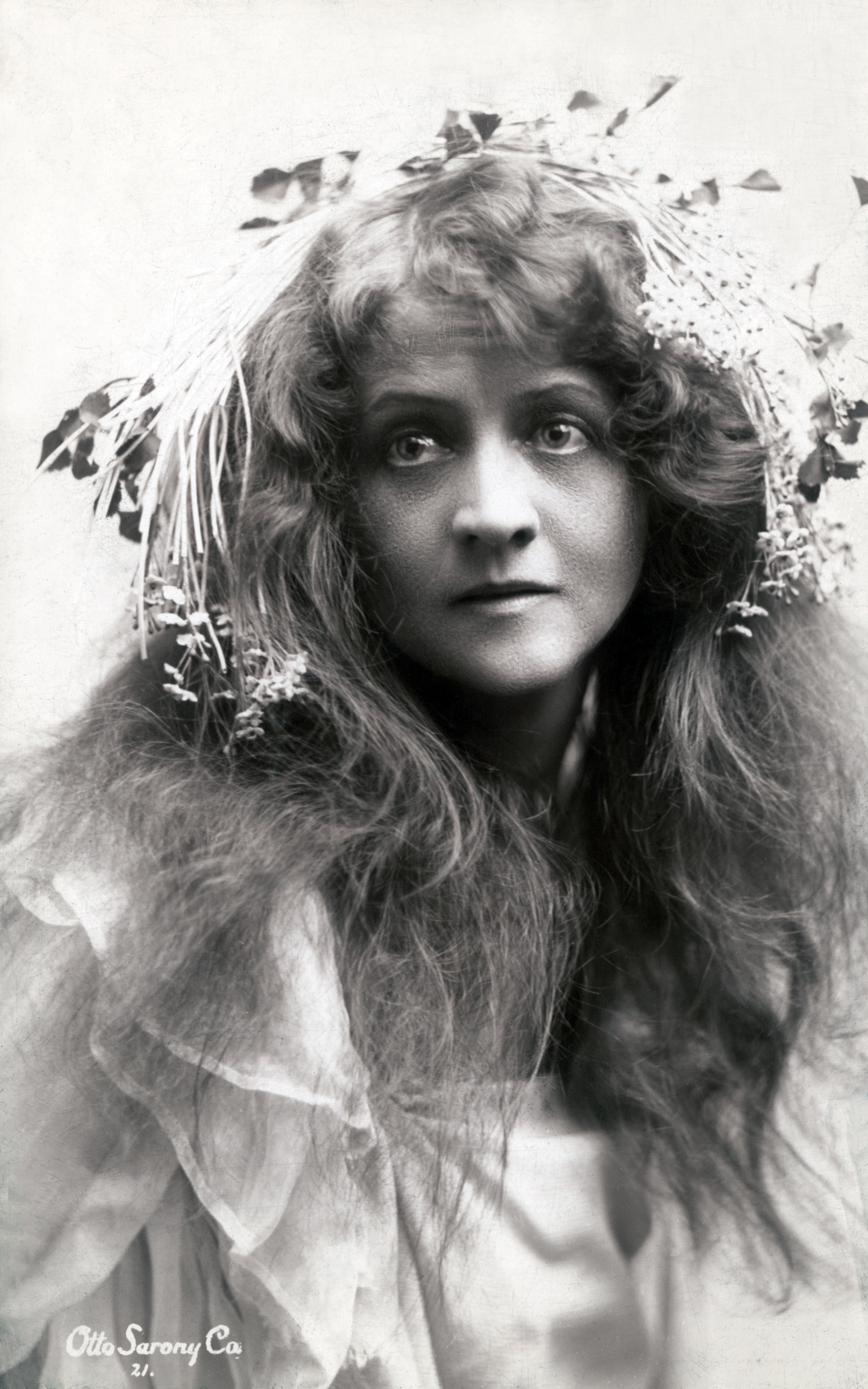
Ellen Beach Yaw as Ophelia in Hamlet

Yaw made her grand opera debut as Ophelia in Ambroise Thomas's Hamlet in Nice in 1903 or 1904. In February 1905, she sang the title role in Donizetti's Lucia di Lammermoor under the stage name Elena Elvanna at the Quirinal Theater in Rome, followed by additional performances in Naples, Catania, and Milan. In July of the same year she sang the role of Gilda in two performances of Verdi's Rigoletto at the Waldorf Theatre in London. Her operatic repertoire reportedly included about 18 works, including Lakmé, La traviata, Un ballo in maschera, The Magic Flute, The Marriage of Figaro, The Barber of Seville, and La bohème.

=== Metropolitan Opera debut ===
Yaw gave her first and only performance at the Metropolitan Opera House in New York on March 21, 1908. At the time, the Met was competing for singers and public support with Oscar Hammerstein's Manhattan Opera Company, which had been formed only two years earlier and, in spite of some initial skepticism from the New York musical establishment, had quickly become a formidable competitor, booking international stars such as Nellie Melba, Mary Garden, Lillian Nordica, and Alessandro Bonci, and programming new and rarely performed works such as Debussy's Pelléas et Mélisande and Offenbach's Tales of Hoffmann. In one of his greatest coups, Hammerstein had secured a contract with soprano Luisa Tetrazzini, then at the peak of her fame and coming off a series of performances at Covent Garden in London, where she had been rapturously greeted as "the voice of the century". Tetrazzini made her New York debut with the Manhattan Opera Company on January 21, 1908, and appeared in 21 further performances during the season. Her association with his crosstown rival was particularly galling to Metropolitan director Heinrich Conried, who had tried to obtain Tetrazzini's services as early as 1904, but had failed when their negotiations devolved into recriminations and lawsuits. When he heard that she had signed with Hammerstein, he sued again, unsuccessfully, to prevent her from performing. It was at this point that Conried offered Ellen Beach Yaw, whose reputation as a vocal prodigy had already garnered great attention from the press, a chance to put on "a Tetrazzini-like show" at the Metropolitan. The role was Lucia in Lucia di Lammermoor, which Tetrazzini was performing at the same time with Hammerstein's company.

Yaw's Metropolitan debut was by all accounts a popular success, but it received mixed reviews from critics, some of which specifically alluded to the celebrity war between the two opera companies. The New York Press reportedly wrote:

Miss Yaw's coloratura is more perfect than Mme Tetrazzini's, her scales are lighter and more fluent, her trills are much more flexible, precise, and speedy. She performed the difficult cadenza in the "Mad Scene" with all the fioritura heard so often from Mme. Tetrazzini, and the final E flat with exceeding ease and accuracy, and much charm. Technically it was a more finished achievement than the other soprano's.

On the other hand, the critic for The New York Times observed:

[H]er coloratura passages were managed with brilliancy, and with style. Her staccato was especially good. Unfortunately, however, she sang a large part of the second act with false intonation. Her high notes, which have been so much heralded, were disappointing. They were always thin, and not of sufficient carrying power. She transposed the final G of "Quando rapite in Estasi" an octave higher than the score, but without effect. The sudden leap up the scale was not musical, and the tone was so thin that it was not brilliant. The high C’s in the sextet were likewise disappointing. The voice is not a large one in any of its registers, but the high tones are especially small.

Whatever the hopes or expectations of either party, this was Yaw's only appearance at the Metropolitan Opera. She later claimed that Conried had called and offered her a three-year contract, describing her as "the world's greatest coloratura soprano", but that she had turned down the offer because of prior commitments, or because more established artists such as Marcella Sembrich had the first option on all of her favorite roles.

=== Recordings ===
Yaw's first records were made in London in 1899 for the Berliner Gramophone company. In Paris in 1902 she was engaged by the Shah of Persia to make a series of cylinder recordings on his private machine. She recorded ten selections for the Victor Talking Machine Company in 1907, only four of which were released at the time, and in 1912 and 1913 she recorded six sides for the Edison company, only one of which (Yaw's own composition, "The Skylark", written to show off her unusual range) was issued. Thomas Edison reportedly said of her voice, "I can see no defects of any kind in this voice. Sweet on lower notes, and mellow. Best high tones yet for the disc machine." In 1913 she also made three recordings for Keen-o-Phone records, which were later reissued on the Rex label. Her final recordings were "O légère hirondelle" from Gounod's Mireille and "Spring's Invitation" (another of her own compositions), privately recorded in 1937 and later released on the Herrold label; and a version of Ophelia's mad scene from Hamlet, made for the Co-Art Company on June 16, 1941, when she was 71 years old.

== Later life ==
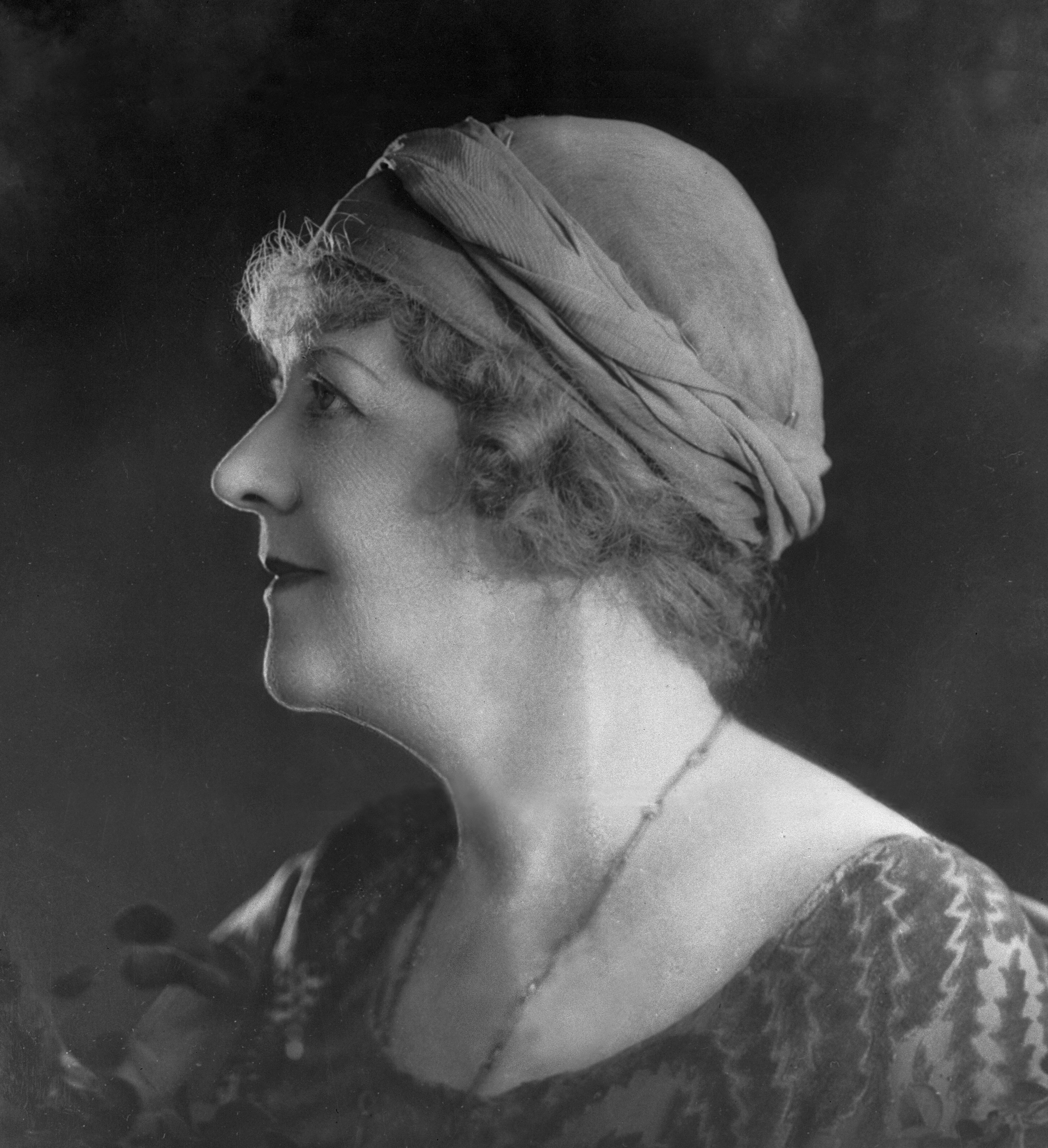
Yaw in February 1936 at age 66

After her Metropolitan Opera experience, Yaw confined her appearances chiefly to concert tours, which she found both easier and more financially rewarding than the operatic stage. According to her student, Antonio Altamirano, she remarked, "Opera is very hard work and I can make more money in one concert than any opera company can pay me!" She continued to tour in Europe until 1912, and after a break during World War I, she resumed touring in North America from 1921 until her retirement in 1931.

For the last four decades of her life, Yaw resided in Covina, California, about 25 miles east of Los Angeles, where her mother and her sister, Anna Yaw Thorpe, also lived. She was known locally as "Lark Ellen", a nickname given to her in the 1890s by Harrison Gray Otis, the publisher of the Los Angeles Times. Her home was a center of musical activity, including vocal and instrumental recitals, where girls and young women sought her singing advice. In 1934 she built an open-air theater, known as the Lark Ellen Bowl, and established the Lark Ellen School of Out-of-Door Singing, declaring in an interview that "If one learns to sing in the open, he can sing anywhere."

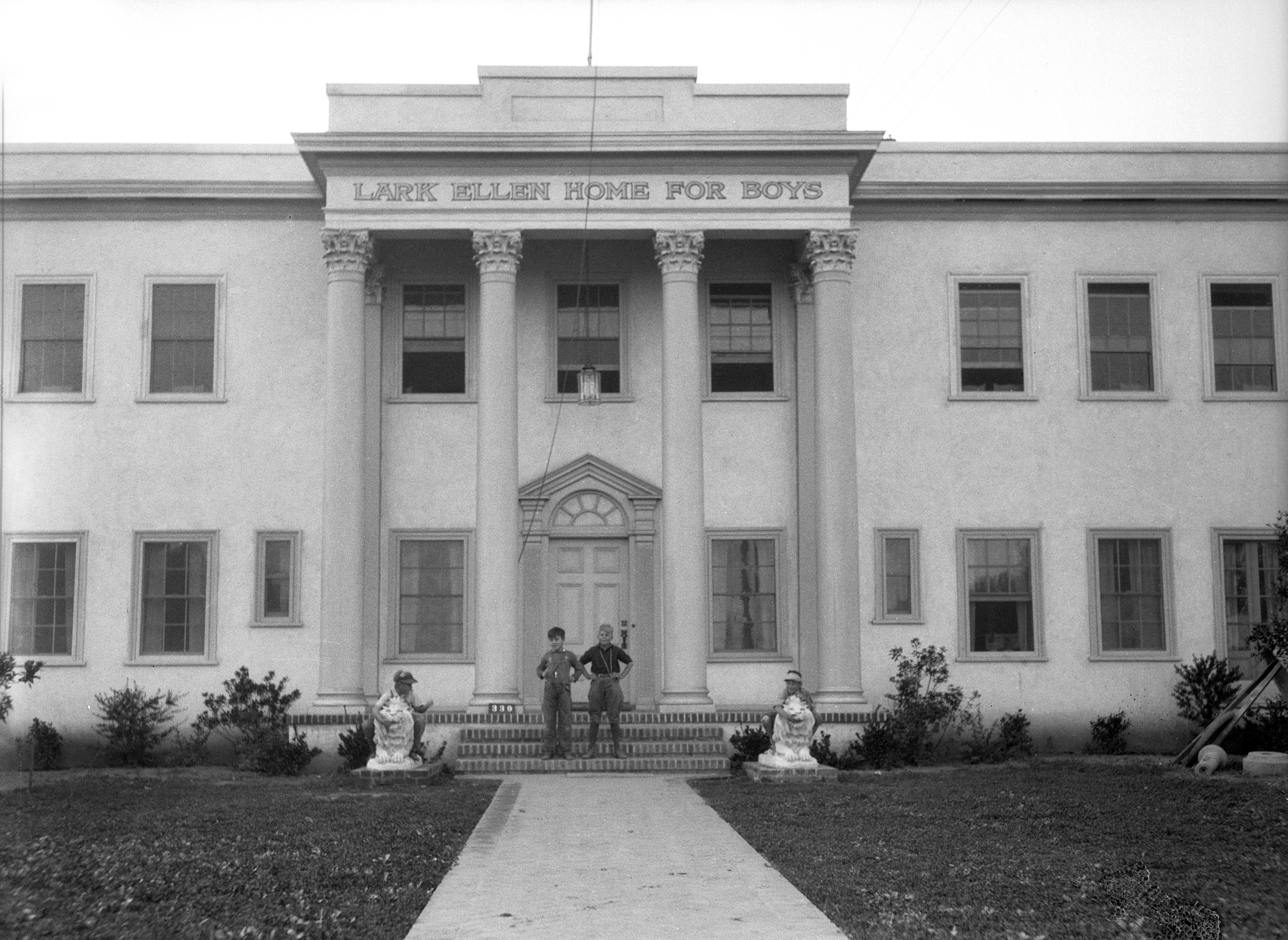
The Lark Ellen Home for Boys in Sawtelle, West Los Angeles, 1924

Aside from her concert tours, Yaw performed frequently at public events throughout the Los Angeles area during the 1910s and 1920s, among them the opening of the Los Angeles Aqueduct on November 5, 1913, where she sang a composition of her own entitled "California, Hail the Waters!" Much of her work was in aid of charitable causes, and under the auspices of the Lark Ellen League she give concerts in hospitals, homes, and jails. She was especially supportive of organizations that helped poor or homeless children, such as the Day Nursery of the Daughters of the King in Los Angeles, which provided day care for children of working single mothers. The charity with which she was most closely associated was the Los Angeles Newsboys' Home, which was established in 1890 as a residence for indigent and homeless boys, and which in 1894 was formally renamed the Lark Ellen News and Working Boys' Home (later simply the Lark Ellen Home for Boys). She continued to support the home with annual benefit concerts and other assistance for the rest of her life.

In Covina, Lark Ellen Avenue, Lark Ellen elementary school, and Lark Ellen station (on the Pacific Electric Railway) were named in her honor. Lark Ellen Towers, a high-rise apartment building and sometime nursing home, was demolished in 1997 and replaced by Lark Ellen Village, an affordable housing and retirement complex.

=== Private life ===
In later life, Yaw was a Republican and a Christian Scientist. She was married twice, first in 1907 to Vere Goldthwaite, a Nebraska-born Boston lawyer, who died in 1912; then, in 1920, to Franklin D. Cannon, a pianist and music teacher, who accompanied on her concert tours in the 1920s. They divorced in 1935.

Yaw died of jaundice on September 9, 1947, just shy of her 78th birthday. She was buried at Rose Hills Memorial Park near Whittier, California. After her death, her memoirs, entitled The Song of the Lark, were reportedly in the hands of her student Altamirano, who was preparing them for publication, but they were not published and have not been found; he died in 1986.
