= Cedars Park, Cheshunt =

Historic public park originally the site of Theobalds Palace in Hertfordshire, England

Cedars Park
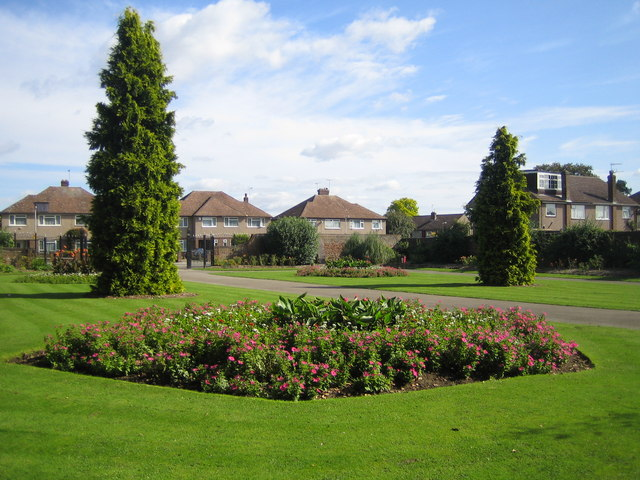
- Residences on Theobalds Lane, viewed from the park
- Interactive map of Cedars Park
- Type: Historic public park
- Location: Cheshunt, Hertfordshire
- Coordinates: 51°41′30″N 0°02′29″W
- Opened: 1921
- Operator: Borough of Broxbourne
- Awards: Green Flag Award
- Designation: Queen Elizabeth II Field
- Website: https://www.parksherts.co.uk/parks/view/cedars-park

Cedars Park is a historic public park located in Cheshunt, Hertfordshire, England. It was originally the site of Theobalds Palace, King James I's favourite residence. The park has received a Green Flag Award every year since 2009, rewarding it for promoting high standards of management for green spaces.

== History ==
Cedars Park is the historic site of the 16th-century Royal Palace of Theobalds, which existed as a smaller estate in the 14th century, and possibly earlier.

Sir William Cecil acquired Theobalds in 1563, and Queen Elizabeth I visited over 15 times between 1564 and 1598. Robert Cecil inherited the Palace and accommodated King James I and his associates on several occasions, including Christian IV of Denmark. In May 1607, the King exchanged Hatfield House for Theobalds. The estate was extended into a grand Royal Palace with a 2500-acre deer park. James I died here in 1625. Charles I rarely used Theobalds Palace and granted the estate to various nobles as an acknowledgement of their services.

The buildings were demolished to support the troops during the Civil War and the estate was eventually sold to the Prescott family in the late 18th century, when new houses were constructed, including The Cedars. In 1820, Theobalds was rented to Sir Henry Meux, who stayed at The Cedars. Admiral of the Fleet Sir Hedworth Meux inherited The Cedars from Valerie, Lady Meux. The grounds were donated to the public in 1919 and opened in 1921.

Cedars Park contains several scheduled monuments, as the site of a magnificent and influential Tudor house (now demolished) with extensive grounds, created by the leading architects, gardeners and craftsmen for Sir William Cecil, and becoming an occasional place for Elizabeth I to reside. Elements of the present park can be identified as probable parts of the original Elizabethan, Jacobean and Georgian gardens and outbuildings.

== Management ==
Cedars Park is managed by Broxbourne Borough Council supported by the Friends of Cedars Park. In 2011, the Council received a £1.89 million grant from the Heritage Lottery Fund and Big Lottery Fund to protect and improve Cedars Park, and conserve & promote its heritage. The park was protected as a Queen Elizabeth II Field under Fields in Trust in 2012 to celebrate the Diamond Jubilee of Elizabeth II.

== Access ==
The park is located on Theobalds Lane with pedestrian and vehicle entrances and a free car park on site. Cedars Park is fully wheelchair accessible.
