= Sir Henry Meux, 1st Baronet =

British brewer and baronet (1770–1841)

Sir Henry Meux, Bt
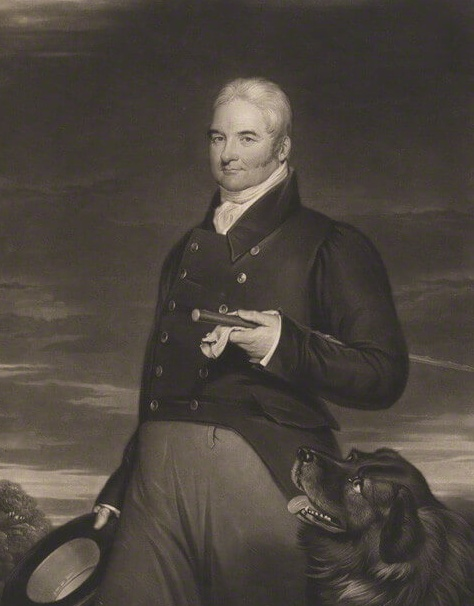
- Sir Henry Meux, 1st Baronet
- Born: 8 May 1770
- Died: 7 April 1841 (aged 70); Theobald's Park, Hertfordshire
- Spouse: Elizabeth-Mary Smith (m. 1831)
- Children: Sir Henry Meux, 2nd Baronet; Elizabeth Arabin; Marianne, Lady Bowyer-Smijth; Emma, Viscountess Malden
- Parent(s): Richard Meux; Mary Brougham
- Relatives: Sir Henry Bruce Meux, 3rd Baronet (grandson); George Capell, 7th Earl of Essex (grandson); Henry Brougham (uncle); Henry Brougham, 1st Baron Brougham and Vaux (cousin)

Sir Henry Meux, 1st Baronet (pronounced "Mews") (8 May 1770 – 7 April 1841) was a British brewer, owner of the London brewery which became the Meux Brewery.

== Early life ==
Meux was baptised on 8 May 1770. He was the second son of brewer Richard Meux (c. 1734–1813) - whose portrait was drawn in 1796 by Henry Bone copied from a painting by Sir William Beechey - and Mary (née Brougham) Meux (c. 1744–1812). Henry's elder brother was Richard Meux, who died in 1824, leaving his daughter, and heiress, Elizabeth Meux, who married Thomas Starling Benson of Champion Lodge (parents of Richard Meux Benson, SSJE, and Gen. Henry Roxby Benson). Another sister, Fanny Meux, was the wife of Vicesimus Knox.

Meux was descended from an old Isle of Wight family. The elder brother of his grandfather's grandfather, Sir John Meux, MP for Newtown, had been created a baronet in 1641; but the title became extinct with Sir John's grandson in 1705. (Note: The Meux family was descended from Sir Walter Meux, of Meaux, in France, who married Eleanor Strangways, daughter of Sir Henry Strangways and Margaret Manners (daughter of George Manners, 11th Baron Ros, and Ann St Leger, herself a daughter of Sir Thomas St Leger and Ann, sister of Kings Edward IV and Richard III and their siblings Edmund, Earl of Rutland; Elizabeth of York, Duchess of Suffolk; Margaret, Duchess of Burgundy; and George Plantagenet, 1st Duke of Clarence).) Sir Henry's maternal grandfather was Henry Broughman of Brougham Hall, Cumbria, and his uncle was Henry Brougham, father of Lord Broughman and Vaux.

== Career ==
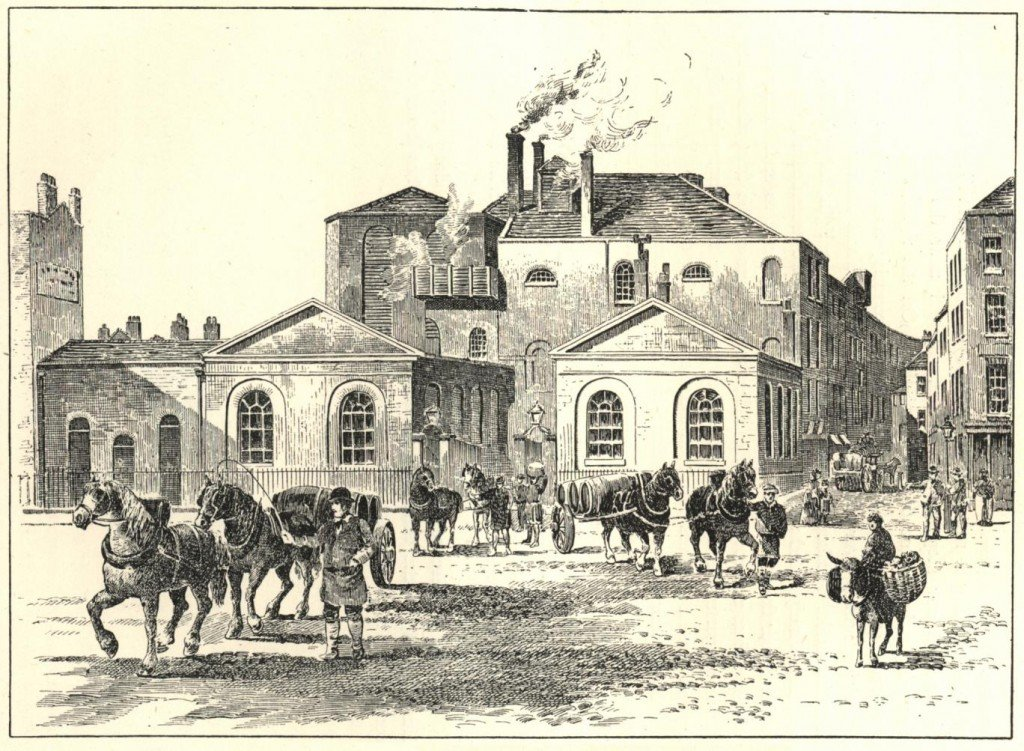
Horse Shoe Brewery, London, c. 1800

Meux's father owned the Griffin Brewery on Liquorpond Street in Clerkenwell, London, and Meux learned the business from him. His father built in 1795 the largest recorded vat, that held 20,000 barrels and cost £10,000. However, Meux "left his father's employ, in 1809, after an argument" and acquired the Horse Shoe Brewery, a brewery in the City of Westminster that had been formed in 1764. Meux renamed it "Henry Meux & Co." and it became a major producer of porter. In 1814, his brewery was the site of the London Beer Flood, which killed eight people after a porter vat burst. After his death in 1841, his son took over the brewery.

On 30 September 1831 he was made a baronet of the second creation of the Meux baronets, this time of Theobald's Park.

== Personal life ==
On 1 November 1816, Meux married Elizabeth-Mary Smith, a daughter of Thomas Smith of Castlebar House, Middlesex. Together, they were the parents of one son and three daughters:

- Sir Henry Meux, 2nd Baronet (1817–1883), who married Lady Louisa Caroline Brudenell-Bruce, the eldest daughter of Ernest Brudenell-Bruce, 3rd Marquess of Ailesbury and his wife, the former Hon. Louisa Elizabeth Horsley-Beresford (daughter of John Horsley-Beresford, 2nd Baron Decies), in 1856.
- Elizabeth Mary Meux (1819–1880), who married her first cousin, Richard Arabin, a son of William St Julien Arabin and Mary (née Meux) Arabin.
- Marianne Frances Meux (d. 1875), who married Sir William Bowyer-Smijth, 11th Baronet, eldest son of the Rev. Sir Edward Bowyer-Smijth, Bt. of Hill Hall, in 1839.
- Emma Martha Meux (1822–1905), who married Arthur de Vere Capell, Viscount Malden, eldest son and heir apparent of Arthur Capell, 6th Earl of Essex, in 1853.

Sir Henry died at Theobald's Park, Hertfordshire on 7 April 1841, and was succeeded by his only son, Henry. His widow, Lady Meux, died on 18 September 1851.

=== Descendants ===
Through his only son Henry, he was a grandfather of Sir Henry Bruce Meux, 3rd Baronet, who married socialite Valerie Langdon.

Through his daughter Elizabeth, he was a grandfather of William St Julien Arabin, Alice Charlotte Arabin (wife of Hon. Arthur Charles Lewin Cadogan, a son of Henry Cadogan, 4th Earl Cadogan), and Marianne Elizabeth Arabin (wife of John William Gordon Woodford, son of Sir Alexander George Woodford).

Through his daughter Marianne, he was a grandfather of diplomat Sir William Bowyer-Smijth, 12th Baronet, who died unmarried.

Through his youngest daughter Emma, he was a grandfather of George Capell, 7th Earl of Essex, who married American heiress Adele Beach Grant.

Baronetage of the United Kingdom
New creation	Baronet (of Theobold's Park); 1831–1841	Succeeded by Henry Meux
