= Theobalds House =

Stately home in Hertfordshire, England

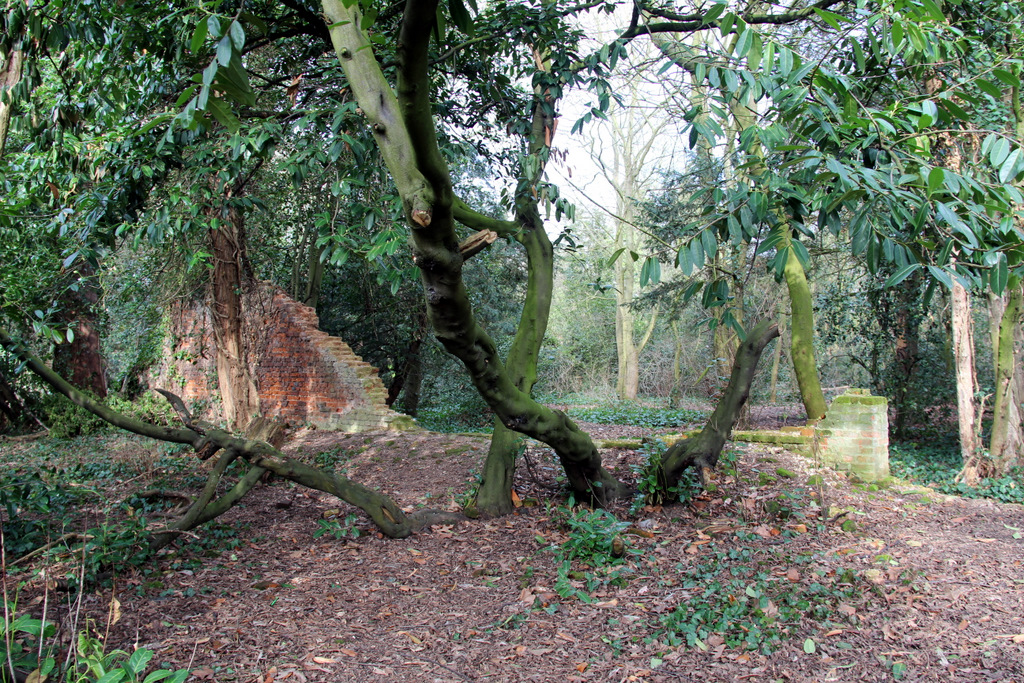
- Ruined wall in Cedars Park, Cheshunt.
- Interactive map of the Theobalds House area

General information
- Coordinates: 51°41′32″N 0°2′29″W

Theobalds House, also known as Theobalds Palace, was a significant 16th-century stately home located in the parish of Cheshunt, Hertfordshire.

Set in extensive parkland, it was a residence of statesmen Lord Burghley and his son the Earl of Salisbury, both leading royal advisers. It was a notable example of the Elizabethan prodigy house. It became a royal palace in the seventeenth century when it was acquired by King James I, who died there in 1625. The palace was demolished as a result of the English Civil War.

A new mansion, Theobalds Park, was built on the estate in 1763, about a mile west of the palace: this Grade II* listed building now serves as a hotel. The site of the original sixteenth-century palace is now occupied by a public park, Cedars Park, in which some Grade II listed remnants of the palace can be seen.

== Early history ==
The manor was originally called Cullynges, later Tongs (after William de Tongge), and since 1440, Thebaudes, Tibbolds, and finally Theobalds. The original manor house was surrounded by a moat. In 1563, it was bought by William Cecil, 1st Baron Burghley, senior councillor of Queen Elizabeth I. He entertained Elizabeth in this house on several occasions.

=== Fit for a queen ===
Lord Burghley commissioned a grand new house, which was built between 1564 and 1585. Burghley's intention in building the mansion was partly to demonstrate his increasingly dominant status at the royal court, and also to provide a palace fine enough to accommodate the Queen on her visits. The Queen visited eight times between 1572 and 1596. The location was ideal in that it lay just off the main road north from London to Ware, a 2.5 hour horse trot journey from London, and thus an ideal stop at the end of the first day of a royal tour. A list of rooms to be prepared for the royal visit in 1572 survives.

The formal gardens of the house were modelled after the Château de Fontainebleau in France, the English botanist, John Gerard, acting as their superintendent. A plan for rebuilding the inner or conduit court in 1572 was made by Henry Hawthorne, who was a "purveyor" in the royal works. In 1582, brass figures called "terms" were supplied for the Great Chamber fireplace and the windows were glazed with heraldry. There was a water feature, six artificial trees, and the ceiling was decorated with the signs of the zodiac. The great staircase with its oak carvings, similar to those at Hatfield House, was salvaged and eventually installed at Herstmonceux Castle. Another schedule of rooms and lodgings was drawn up in May 1583, when Elizabeth stayed for a week at Theobalds and was reconciled with the Earl of Oxford. Elizabeth came in May 1591 and an entertainment, the Hermit's Welcome at Theobalds, was performed.

Visitors would first enter the Great Hall. It was two storeys high, with oak panelling and a minstrels' gallery. The hall ceiling was arched over "with curved timber of curious workmanship" and may have resembled the slightly later decorative hammerbeams of the Great Hall at Wollaton. The chimneypiece was carved from blue marble. In 1585 a painter called Jenings drew the heraldry of the peers of England on the wall and provided a frame for a map, the "chart of England".

The Painted, or Green Gallery, completed in 1574 ran over a wing of lodgings and bedchambers. The decoration of the Green Gallery was also of a topographic and heraldic character. It was described by a German visitor, Jacob Rathgeb, secretary to the Duke of Württemberg, who visited in 1592, and the Baron Waldstein in 1600. Frederic Gerschow, secretary to the Duke of Stettin-Pomerania, saw the hall in 1602 and explained that England was represented by 52 "trees", a tree for each county hung with arms of the earls and barons. There were also token items depicting the produce of the regions. Paul Hentzner mentioned a canal in the garden for visitors to row boats amidst the shrubbery.

Two thieves, John Todd alias Black Jack and Thomas Travers got into the Queen's privy chambers and stole an inkstand and two silver bowls in September 1597. They were caught and executed. Burghley employed the London goldsmith Richard Martin to recover the silver they had sold. Lord Burghley's younger son, Robert Cecil, 1st Earl of Salisbury, inherited the house. The Earl of Northumberland paid him a compliment, writing that for planning his own new house he was going to look at Copthall and as a builder he "must borrow of knowledge somewhat out of Tibballs, somewhat out of every place of mark where curiosities are used.

=== King James and Theobalds ===
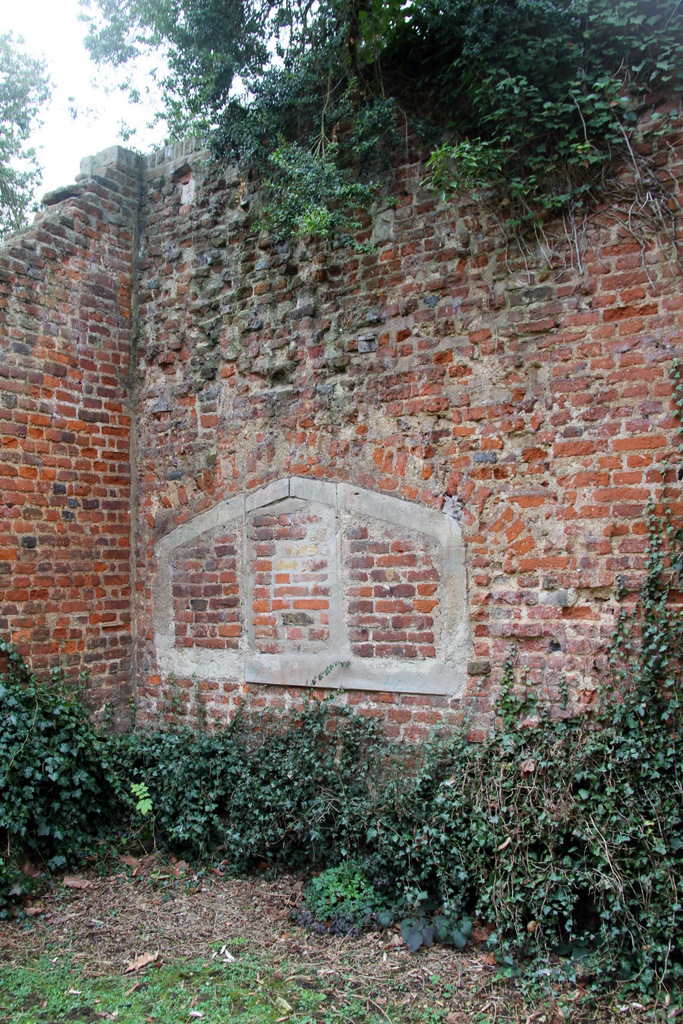
Ruins of walls and entranceways, located in Cedars Park, are all that remain today of Theobalds.

After the Queen's death in 1603, Robert Cecil arranged for the new king, James I, to stay on his way from Scotland to London, and receive homage from the Privy Council. The king was troubled by the dust of the entrance road or drive, and an alternative route was made through the lands of Cheshunt Park and Peryours. James wrote to Cecil to provide stags for him to hunt in the woods and park of Theobalds in July 1604. Fulke Greville went to Theobalds in May 1605 to report on Salisbury's horses and survey the lake and islands in the park. Greville suggested enlarging some windows in one of the galleries of the house.

In July 1606, Cecil again entertained King James and his brother-in-law, King Christian IV of Denmark, at Theobalds, while Anne of Denmark stayed at Greenwich. Both monarchs were notoriously heavy drinkers, and according to Sir John Harington, the occasion was simply an orgy of drunkenness, as few English or Danish courtiers had their rulers' capacity to hold their drink: an attempt to put on a masque of Solomon and Sheba descended into a farce, as most of the players were too inebriated to remember their lines, or even to stand up. The five-day visit cost Cecil £1,180 including presents worth £284. Cecil paid Inigo Jones £23 for making and designing the masque scenery. Doubts have been expressed about the details in Harington's description of the masque.

In 1607, King James I acquired Theobalds in exchange for Hatfield Palace, also in Hertfordshire. James gave Theobalds to Anne of Denmark in 1607, and this formality was the occasion of court festivities in May 1607 involving hunting, tournaments, and the Prince de Joinville. James ordered improvements, and bought neighbouring lands to extend the park, and Theobalds quickly became his favourite country residence.

The house had some disadvantages compared with other aristocrats' houses. Although James declared in 1607 that it was "a fitting place for our sports", Godfrey Goodman noted that it had no "lordship nor tenants, nor so much as provision of fuel, only a park for pleasure and no more". In 1624, Prince Charles wrote "there is no kind of field-hawking there". Theobalds was however conveniently near to Waltham Forest where the king could hunt. In July 1613 Anne of Denmark was hunting deer at Theobalds and accidentally shot and killed the king's dog "Jewel" with a crossbow bolt. King James invited a young Polish-Lithuanian nobleman Tomasz Zamoyski to join the hunt at Theobalds in July 1615.

In September 1618 James gave orders for the demolition of two new buildings nearby that housed tobacco shops patronised by his courtiers. He also ordered the keeper of the gardens, Munten Jennings, to build a house to keep silkworms and feed them mulberry leaves. The architect John Smythson visited and made drawings, a surviving diagram shows the panelling of the great chamber in "walnut tree colour" graining with black and gold mouldings.

On 9 January 1622 King James rode from Theobalds after dinner to see the ice on the New River and fell in head first so that his companions could only see his boots. He was rescued by Sir Richard Young and returned to a warm bed at Theobalds. A new pool with a barge and barge house was created in the gardens in 1622. The ambassador Diego Sarmiento de Acuña, 1st Count of Gondomar arranged for the gift of two camels and a breeding pair of asses to be sent from Spain for the park in 1622.

King James died at Theobalds on 27 March 1625. The Knight Marshal, Edward Zouch proclaimed King Charles at Theobalds gate. James had made few changes to the main suites, installing panelling in the Great Gallery to which his son Charles I added a number of carved and painted stag's heads. Charles I hunted in the park at Theobalds. Platforms known as "stands" were built in the park each season for shooting at game. In September 1633, Henry Cary, 1st Viscount Falkland fell from a stand at Theobalds and died after his leg was amputated.

Later, after the execution of Charles I, Theobalds was listed, amongst other royal properties, for demolition and disposal by the Commonwealth. This was achieved speedily, and by the end of 1650, the house was largely demolished. After the Restoration, the estate was granted to George Monck, 1st Duke of Albemarle, but reverted to the Crown after the death of the 2nd Duke of Albemarle, who left no heir.

== Eighteenth and nineteenth centuries: the new house ==
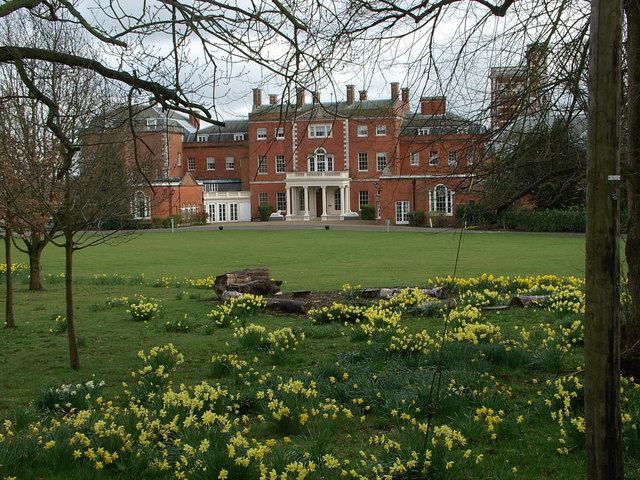
Theobalds Park, built in 1763

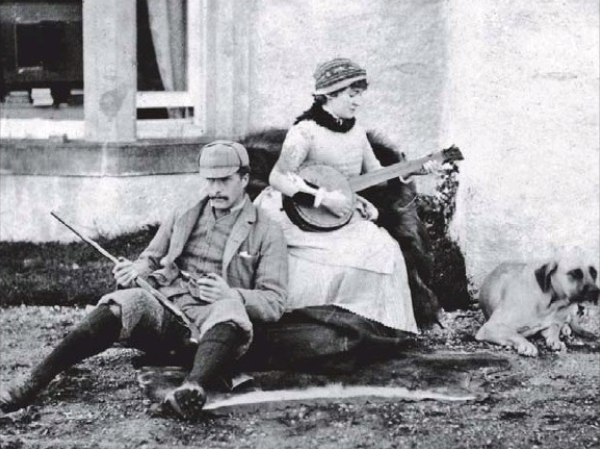
Sir Henry Bruce Meux, 3rd Baronet and his wife Lady Valerie

The estate was then given by King William III to William Bentinck, 1st Earl of Portland and descended in that family until sold in 1762 by the 3rd Duke of Portland to George Prescott, a merchant and MP. In 1763, Prescott built a Georgian style mansion, known as Theobalds Park, about a mile to the west of the original palace. Around the same time, four smaller country houses, known collectively as Theobalds Square, were built around the site of the palace on the eastern part of the estate, including Old Palace House, The Cedars, and Grove House.

The new house passed from the Prescott family to the Meux family of Meux's Brewery fame in about 1820, and they made extensive alterations and added extensions during the nineteenth century. These included a remodelled entrance based on Sir Christopher Wren's Temple Bar Gate, which had been dismantled and stored in a yard at Farringdon Road. In 1888, it caught the eye of the beautiful (painted by Whistler) and eccentric Lady Meux (formerly a banjo-playing barmaid named Val); the gateway was purchased from the City of London and the 400 tons of stone was transported by horse-drawn carts to the park, where it was carefully rebuilt at a cost of £10,000. Lady Val Meux often entertained in the gateway's upper chamber; guests included King Edward VII and Winston Churchill.

== Later history ==
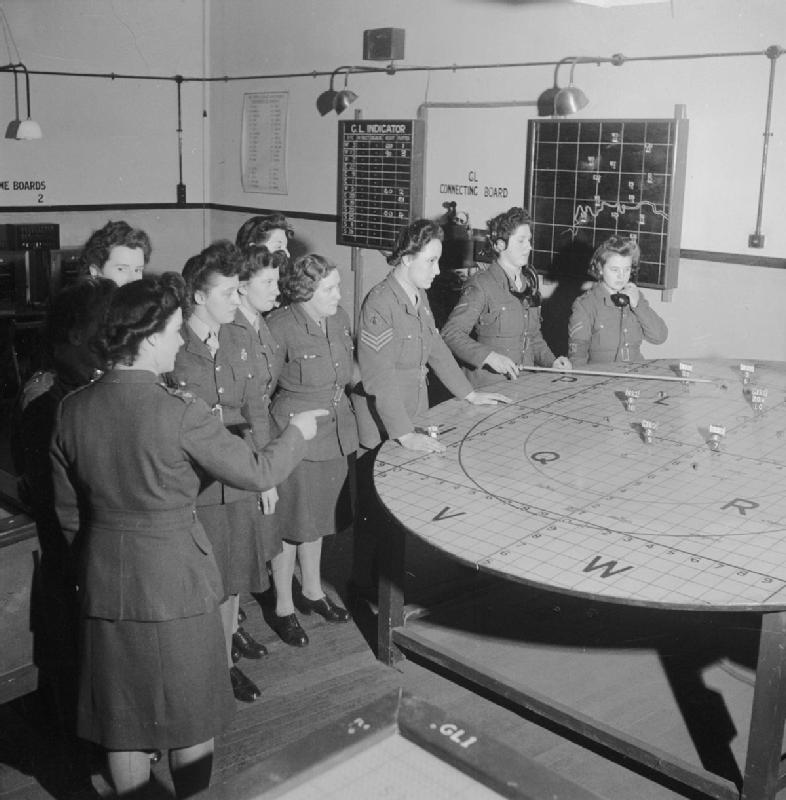
ATS women in the Gun Operations Room of AA Command

When Sir Hedworth Lambton, the commander of the Naval Brigade at the siege of Ladysmith, returned to England, he called on Lady Meux at Theobalds to recount his adventures. She was so taken with him that she made him the chief beneficiary of her will, on condition that he change his surname to Meux (she was without direct heirs, and had been snubbed by her husband's family). When she died on 20 December 1910, he willingly changed his name to Sir Hedworth Meux by Royal Warrant and inherited the Hertfordshire estate and a substantial interest in the Meux Brewery.

In 1912, the house known as The Cedars, built on the eastern part of the estate on part of the site of the Elizabethan palace, was partly destroyed by fire. In 1921 the site of this house was given to the town of Cheshunt by Sir Hedworth Meux to commemorate the end of World War I, and became a public park, known as Cedars Park. The park was subsequently expanded to encompass the sites of nearby Grove House, which had been demolished in 1912, and Old Palace House, which was destroyed by fire in 1968. Part of The Cedars survives in the centre of the park and remains in use, and fragments of the Elizabethan palace and of Old Palace House can be seen, as well as an eighteenth-century grotto.

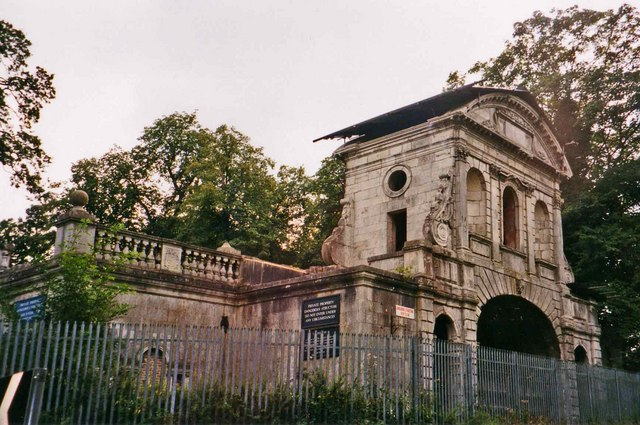
Temple Bar Gate in Theobalds Park before 2001

Following Meux's death in 1929, Theobalds Park, the eighteenth-century mansion on the western part of the estate, was a hotel for some years. It was then sold to Middlesex County Council in 1938. During World War II, the house was used by the Royal Artillery and then by the Metropolitan Police as a riding school. In 1951 it became a secondary school and after 1969, an adult education centre. In the 1990s it was refurbished for use as a commercial conference centre. By 2009, it had been converted as the Theobalds Park Hotel in the De Vere Venues chain. On Christmas Eve 2015, Katie Locke was murdered at the hotel by a man she was on a first date with; Carl Langdell was jailed for life for the crime in June 2016. The hotel relaunched as Birch Cheshunt in 2020, but closed in 2023. In 2025, Surya Hotels acquired the property and opened The Ridings restaurant and rooms in another building on the estate, and then reached an agreement in 2026 with IHG Hotels & Resorts, on the basis of which Theobalds Park itself would be refurbished to open as an IHG hotel in 2027.

The Temple Bar Gate was excluded from the 1938 sale of the mansion, and remained in the hands of the Meux family trustees. Despite its status as a Scheduled Ancient Monument, it lapsed into decay. After a long campaign, it was decided to return it to the City in 2001. The arch was again dismantled, and was reconstructed on a site next to St Paul's Cathedral. The project was completed in November 2004, and a commemorative plaque was placed in Theobalds Park.
