= Valerie, Lady Meux =

British socialite (1852–1910)

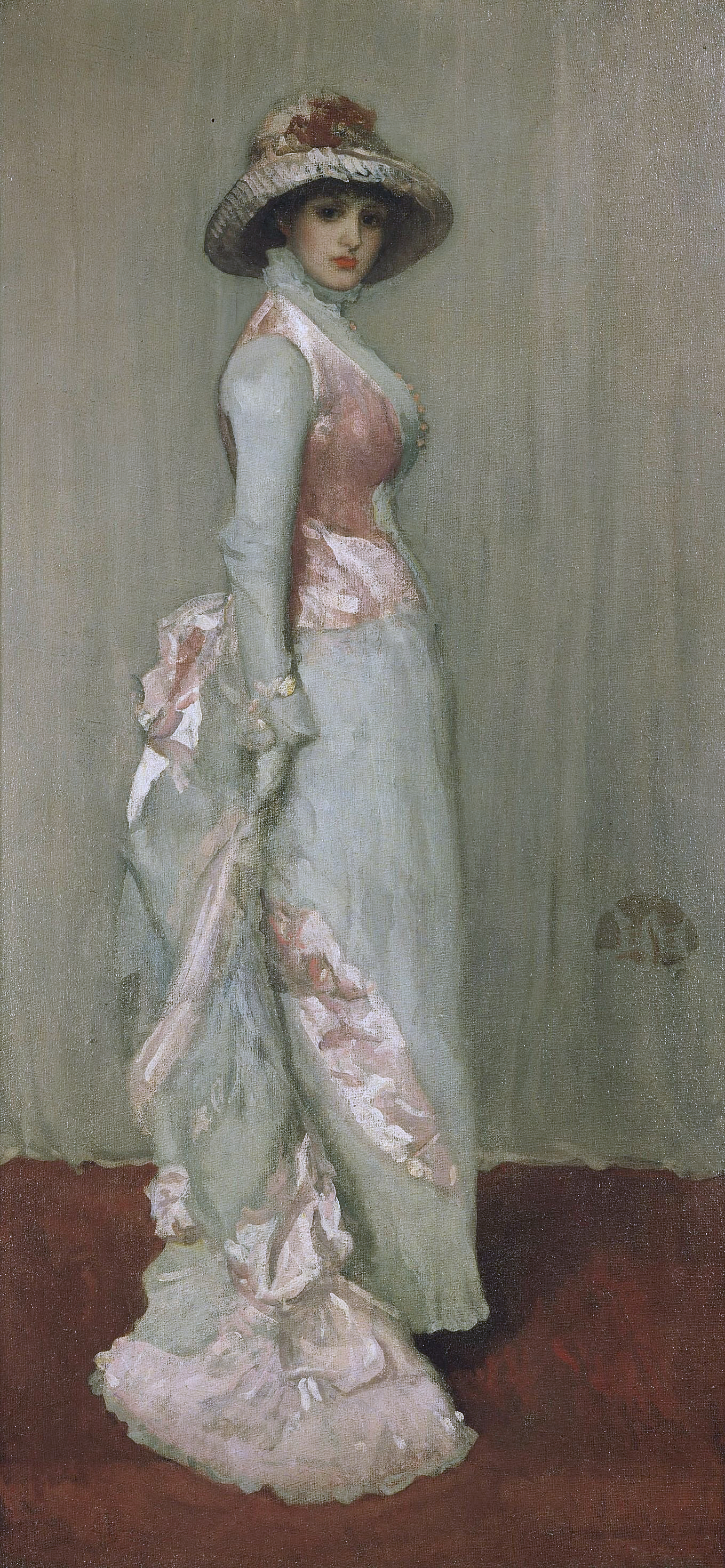
Harmony in Pink and Grey (Portrait of Lady Meux), by James Abbott McNeill Whistler, 1881, Frick Collection

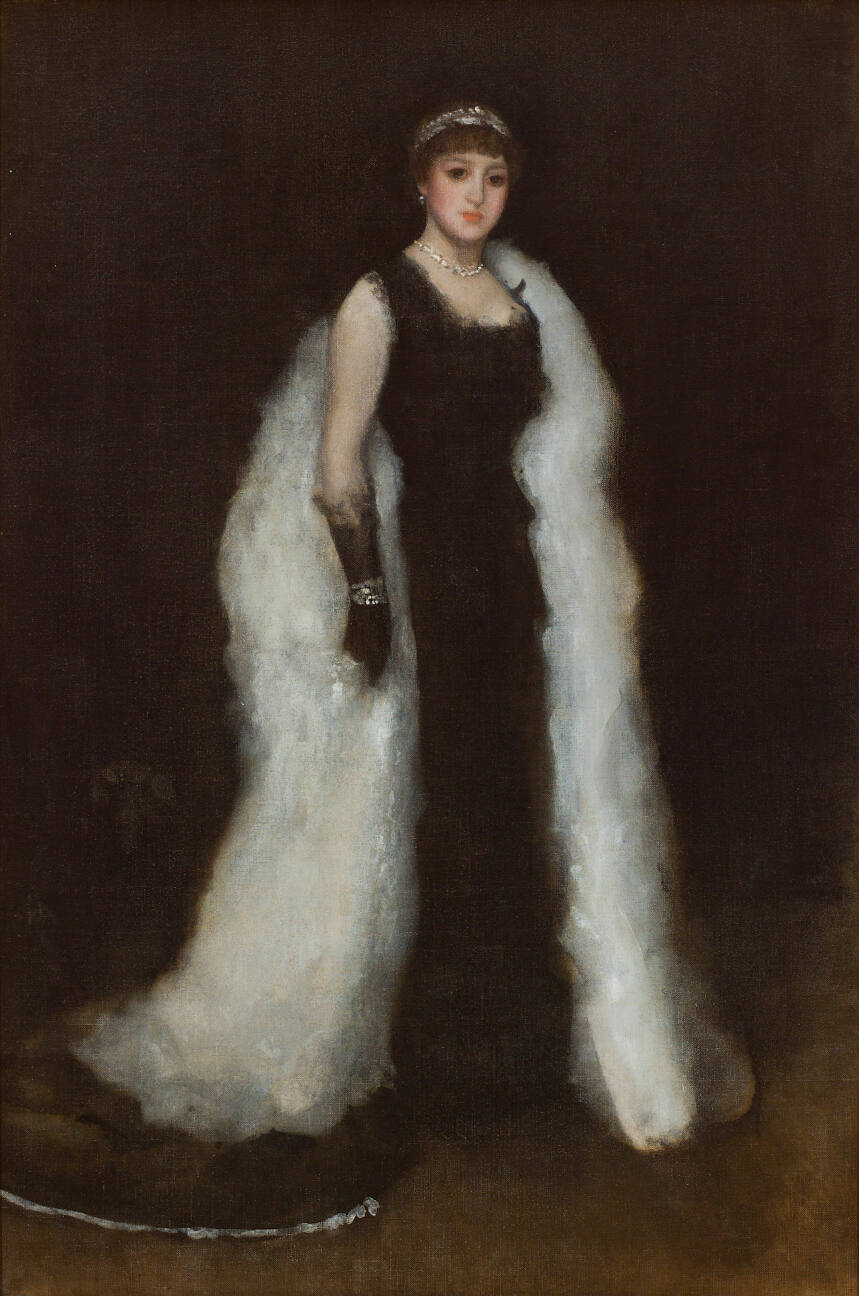
Arrangement in Black, No. 5 (Portrait of Lady Meux), James McNeill Whistler, 1881, Honolulu Academy of Arts in Hawaii.

Valerie Susan, Lady Meux (pronounced "Mews"; née Langdon; 1852–1910), was a Devon-born socialite of the Victorian era. She was the wife of Sir Henry Bruce Meux, 3rd Baronet (1856–1900), who came from one of Britain’s richest brewing dynasties, Meux’s Brewery, founded in 1764, which was a major brewer of porter ale in London in the 19th century.

== Early life ==
Langdon was born in Crockernwell, Drewsteignton, Devon on 27 February 1852.

== Married life ==
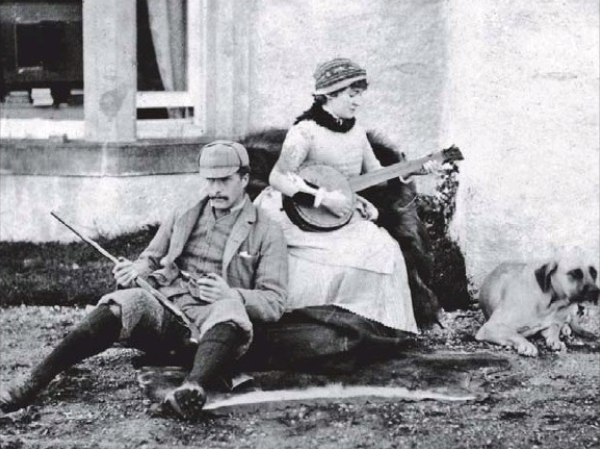
Sir Henry Meux, 3rd Baronet and Lady Meux

Langdon claimed to have been an actress, but was apparently on the stage for only a single season. She worked at the Surrey Music Hall in a pantomime. She is believed to have met Sir Henry Meux at the Casino de Venise in Holborn, where she worked as a banjo-playing barmaid and had a stage name Val Langdon. She married him in London on 27 October 1878.

Never accepted by her husband's family or by polite society, Lady Meux was a flamboyant and controversial figure, given to driving herself around London in a high phaeton, drawn by a pair of zebras. Her husband had an estate of some 9,200 acres (3,700 ha) on the Marlborough Downs in Wiltshire. They also had a house, Theobalds, in Hertfordshire, which was lavishly improved and enlarged; additions included a swimming pool and an indoor roller skating rink. In 1887, at Lady Meux's request, the dismantled Temple Bar Gate was purchased from the City of London Corporation, transported to Theobalds Park in Hertfordshire and carefully rebuilt as a new gateway to the estate. She often entertained in the upper chamber of the gateway. Guests included the Prince of Wales and Winston Churchill. Sir Henry died in 1900, without issue, ten years before she did.

== Whistler ==
James Abbott McNeill Whistler painted three portraits of Lady Meux in 1881. The portraits were the first full-scale commissions to be given to Whistler following the notorious Ruskin trial, which had left him financially bankrupt. Harmony in Pink and Grey: Portrait of Lady Meux currently belongs to the Frick Collection in New York City, Arrangement in Black: Lady Meux belongs to the Honolulu Museum of Art while the third portrait, Portrait of Lady Meux in Furs, is believed to have been destroyed by Whistler after he became outraged over a comment made to him by Lady Meux during a sitting.

== Interests ==
Lady Meux also owned a string of race horses, racing them under the assumed name of Mr. Theobolds. As an owner she was not greatly successful, but she won the Sussex Stakes with Ardeshir in 1897.

She was a noted collector of ancient Egyptian artefacts; the Egyptologist Wallis Budge published a catalogue of more than 1,700 of her items including 800 scarabs and amulets. He dedicated his publication The Book of Paradise to her. She tried to leave the collection to the British Museum, but the trustees snobbishly declined the bequest and it was sold. She also acquired five illustrated Ethiopic manuscripts, and Budge published a coloured facsimile of them. On finding that they were revered by the Ethiopians, she left them in her will to Emperor Menelik. The courts set aside this provision, ostensibly to keep them in Britain — and they were sold to William Randolph Hearst, of California.

In the early 20th century, Lady Meux was the châtelaine at Château de Sucy-en-Brie at Sucy-en-Brie in France.

== The Boer War ==
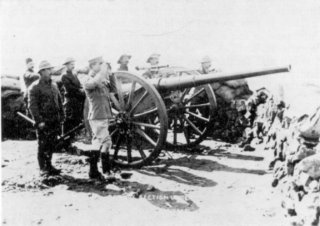
A QF 12-pounder naval gun of the "Elswick Battery". Lady Meux paid for six naval 12-pounder artillery guns to be sent out on special field carriages to the British troops.

During the Second Boer War, the early British reverses made headline news and the defence of Ladysmith made a particular impression on Lady Meux. On hearing of the landing of naval guns for the Battle of Ladysmith, she ordered, at her own expense, six naval 12-pounders on special field carriages made by Armstrong of Elswick. The guns were sent directly to Lord Roberts in South Africa, because they had been refused by the War Office. The unit which manned these guns were known as the "Elswick Battery". The battery was in action several times, including the Second Battle of Silkaatsnek.

== Sir Hedworth Lambton ==
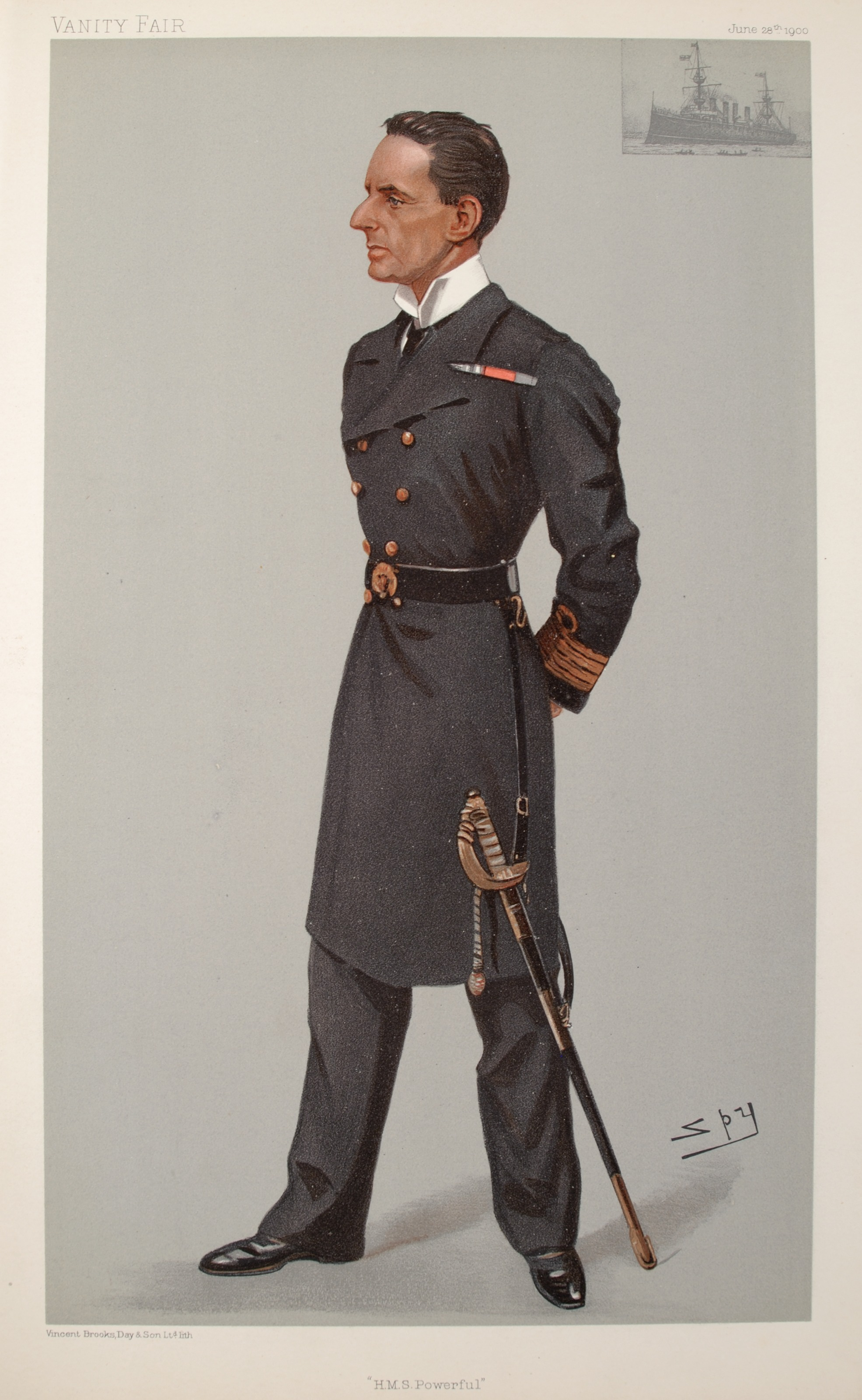
Captain Hedworth Lambton. Caricature by Spy in Vanity Fair, 1900

When Sir Hedworth Lambton, the commander of the Naval Brigade at Ladysmith, returned to England, he called on Lady Meux at Theobalds to thank her for her gift and recount his adventures. She was so taken with him that she made him the chief beneficiary of her will, on condition that he change his surname to Meux (she was without direct heirs). When she died on 20 December 1910, he willingly changed his name by Royal Warrant, and inherited the Hertfordshire estate and a substantial interest in the Meux Brewery.
