= Henry Bruce Meux =

English baronet, brewer and politician (1856–1900)

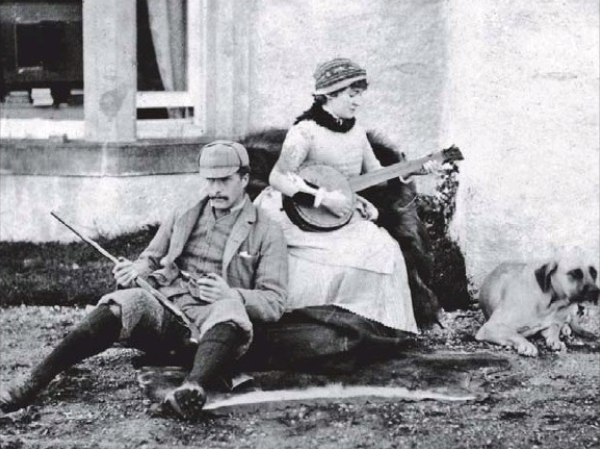
Sir Henry Meux, 3rd Baronet and his wife Lady Meux

Sir Henry Bruce Meux, 3rd Baronet (pronounced "Mews") (21 November 1856 – 11 January 1900) was an English baronet, the son of Sir Henry Meux, 2nd Baronet (1817–1883), a brewer and politician.

== Biography ==
Meux was born in London, educated at Eton College and, from 1875 on, at Trinity College, Cambridge. He was commissioned as a captain of the Royal Wiltshire Yeomanry Cavalry in 1883 and was High Sheriff of Wiltshire in 1886. In 1898, he was promoted to major.

Meux was joint-manager, with Dudley Marjoribanks, of the Westminster brewer Meux's Brewery Company Ltd which they registered as a public company in 1888. His share of the company capital was worth £224,000 in 1894 (which would be over £22 million in 2022).

Meux had a considerable estate, including 9,200 acres (3,700 ha) on the Marlborough Downs in Wiltshire. He restored Vasterne Manor and, in 1889, Wooton Bassett Town Hall, both in Wiltshire. He was a lifetime member of the Wiltshire Archaeological Society, and was elected president of that society in 1893.

He commissioned James Whistler to paint three portraits of his wife, Valerie, Lady Meux. At Lady Meux's request, Henry purchased from the City of London the Temple Bar Gate, which they preserved at their Theobalds Park estate at Cheshunt in Hertfordshire.

Meux died childless in 1900 aged 43. His wife inherited his share of the brewery and his estate.

Baronetage of the United Kingdom
Preceded by Henry Meux	Baronet (of Theobold's Park); 1883–1900	Extinct
