= Villamagna Altarpiece =

Painting by Rosso Fiorentino

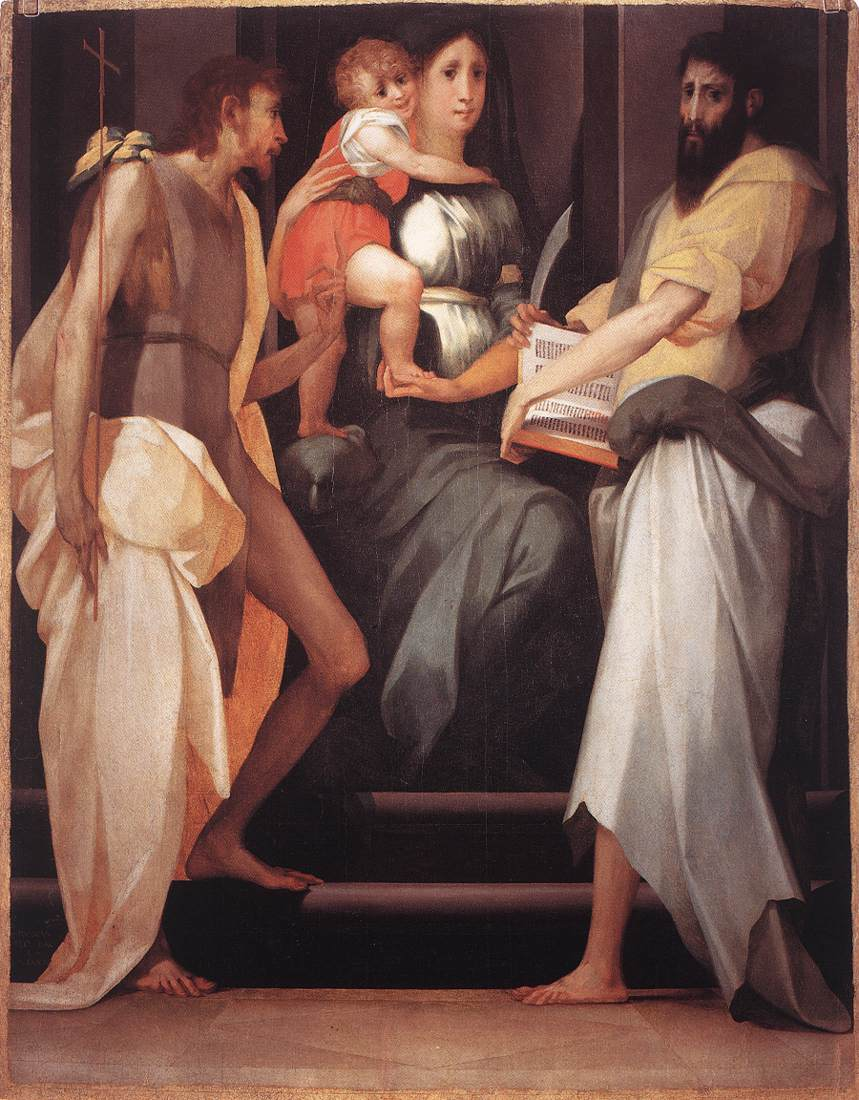
Villamagna Altarpiece (1521) by Rosso Fiorentino

Villamagna Altarpiece is a 1521 oil on panel painting by Rosso Fiorentino, produced for Pieve dei Santi Giovanni Battista e Felicita, Villamagna's parish church, where it remained until the mid 1860s. It is now in the Diocesan Museum in Volterra. The artist's second commission in Volterra after Deposition, it is signed and dated in the lower left-hand corner. To the left of the Madonna and Child is John the Baptist in his camel-skin tunic and holding a cross, whilst to the left is Saint Bartholomew holding an open book and the knife used to flay him.

Compared to his earlier Spedalingo Altarpiece and his later Dei Altarpiece, the work uses a simple symmetrical composition derived from 15th century Florentine traditions. The background, the Madonna's pose (with knee thrust out and the Christ Child clinging to her neck) and the male saint with an open book recall Andrea del Sarto's Madonna of the Harpies.
