= Portrait of a Man in Black =

Painting by Rosso Fiorentino

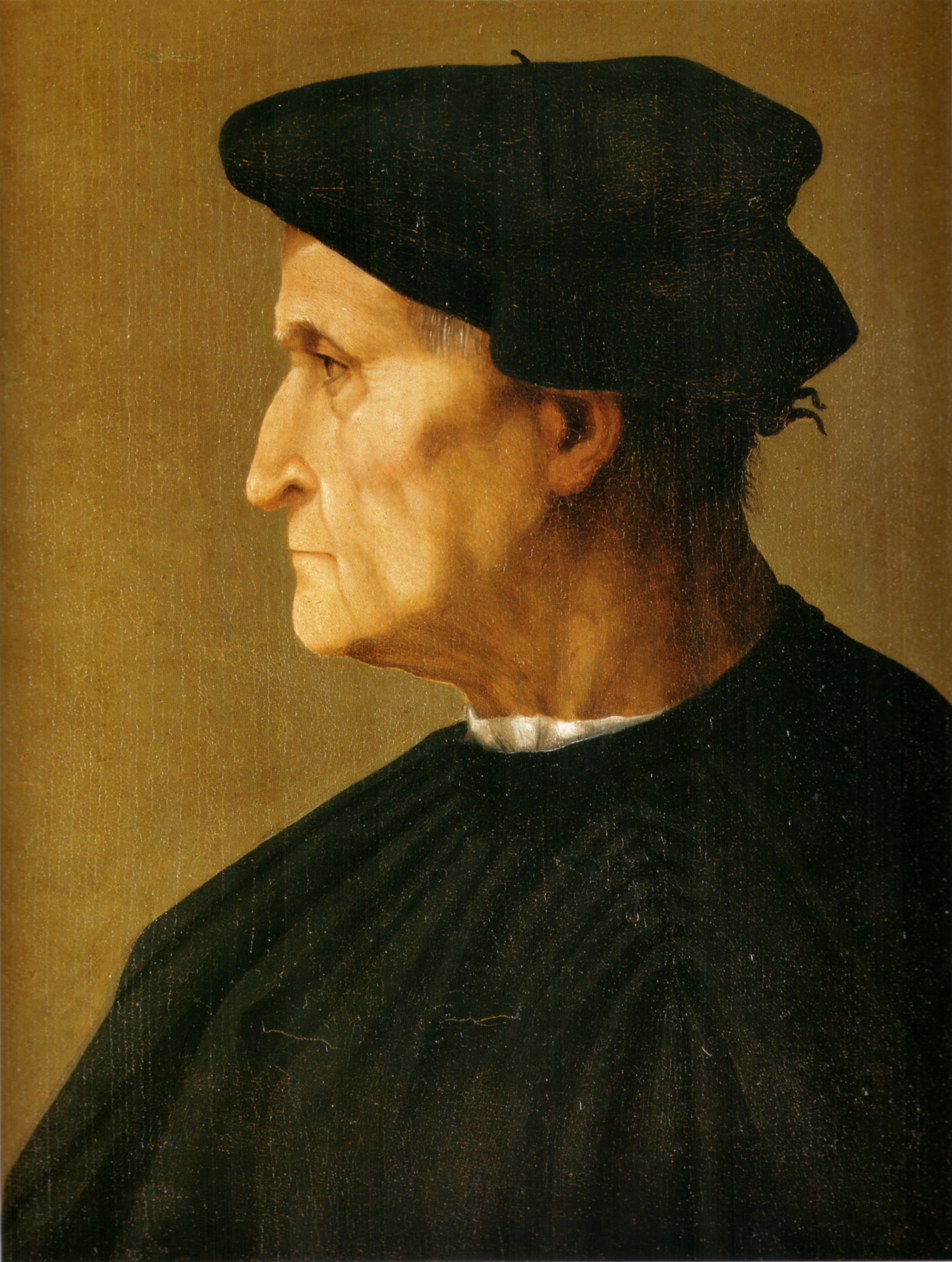
- Artist: Rosso Fiorentino
- Year: c. 1520-1522
- Medium: oil on panel
- Dimensions: 50.5 × 39.5 cm
- Location: Galleria Palatina, Florence

Portrait of a Man in Black or Man in Black in Profile is an oil on panel painting by Rosso Fiorentino, from c. 1520-1522. It is held in the Galleria Palatina, in Florence.

== History and description ==
Vasari's Life of Rosso Fiorentino briefly states that he saw several portraits by the artist in homes in Florence, probably produced before Rosso left for Volterra in 1521. How Man entered the Medici-Lorraine collections is unknown, since the first definite mention of the work is an 1815 inventory placing it in the Galleria's Sala dell'Iliade.

Previously attributed to Pontormo, this was changed by Falciani due to several similarities between it and faces in the Volterra Deposition, placing it just before or after Rosso Fiorentino's stay in Volterra. Franklin (1997) argued against the reattribution, but it was backed by Padovani and Antonio Natali, with the latter seeing similarities to a medal of Jacopo Sannazaro by Girolamo Santacroce and thus theorising that Rosso had made a trip to Naples. Schaeffer (1910) had previously identified its subject as the Florentine canon Francesco da Castiglione based on similarities to the Entry of Leo X fresco at the Palazzo Vecchio, but Falciani argues against this as the man is in civil not ecclesiastical dress.
