= The Infant Saint John the Baptist (Rosso Fiorentino) =

Painting by Rosso Fiorentino

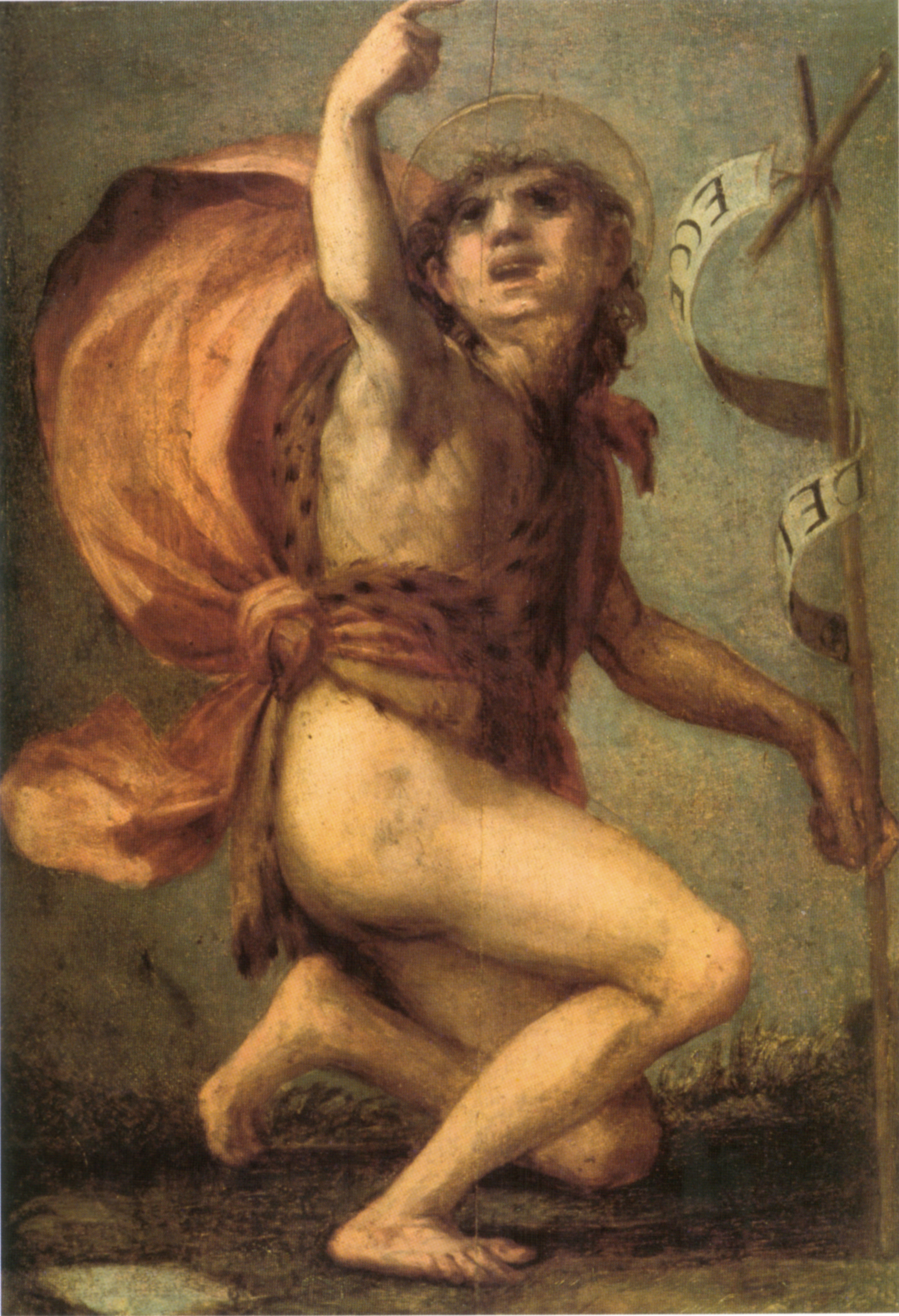
The Infant Saint John the Baptist (c. 1521) by Rosso Fiorentino

The Infant Saint John the Baptist is a c.1521 oil on panel painting by Rosso Fiorentino, now in a private collection in Florence. Stylistically close to the artist's Volterra Deposition, its nervy contour lines and gaunt brushstrokes are also similar to his Holy Family with the Infant Saint John the Baptist (Walters Art Museum).
