= The Dead Christ with Angels (Rosso Fiorentino) =

Painting by Rosso Fiorentino

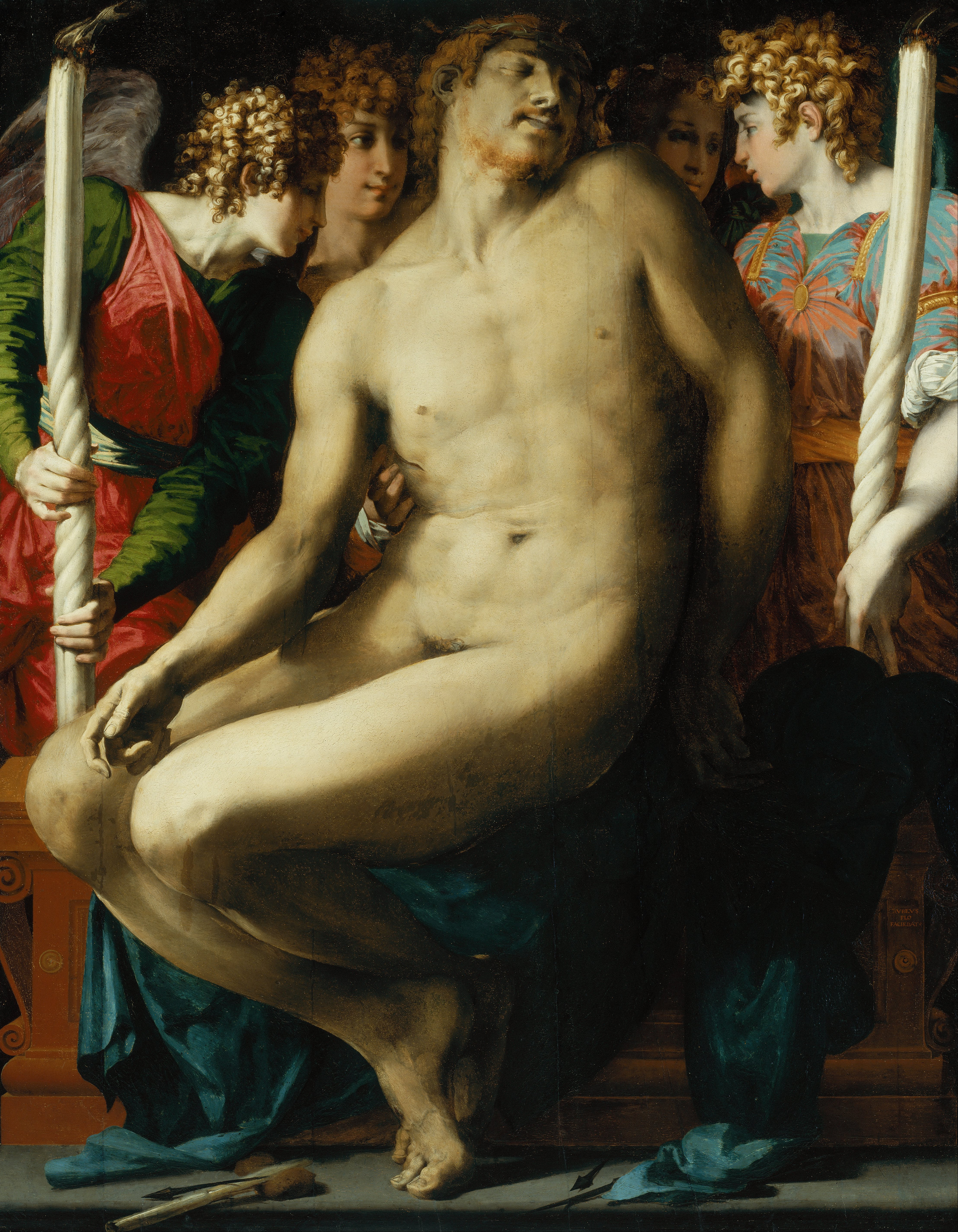
- Artist: Rosso Fiorentino
- Year: c. 1525-1526
- Type: Oil on panel
- Dimensions: 133.4 cm × 104.1 cm (52.5 in × 41.0 in)
- Location: Museum of Fine Arts, Boston

The Dead Christ with Angels or Four Angels Lamenting the Dead Christ is an oil on panel painting by Rosso Fiorentino, executed c. 1525–1526, now in the Museum of Fine Arts in Museum of Fine Arts, in Boston.

Despite the discrepancy in the number of angels, the work is traditionally held to be the "canvas of a dead Christ supported by two angels" mentioned in Vasari's Lives of the Artists as produced for Leonardo Tornabuoni, Bishop of Sansepolcro, one of several Florentine prelates at Pope Clement VII's court. Vasari did not specify the work's intended destination.

It was probably in the artist's studio at the time of the Sack of Rome before being entrusted to Maria Maddalena, a Florentine sister at the San Lorenzo in Colonna monastery.

== Bibliography ==
- (in Italian) Antonio Natali, Rosso Fiorentino, Silvana Editore, Milano 2006. ISBN 88-366-0631-8
- (in Italian) Elisabetta Marchetti Letta, Pontormo, Rosso Fiorentino, Scala, Firenze 1994. ISBN 88-8117-028-0
- "Catalogue entry".
