= Moses Defends Jethro's Daughters =

Painting by Rosso Fiorentino

- Mosè difende le figlie di Jetro (Italian)
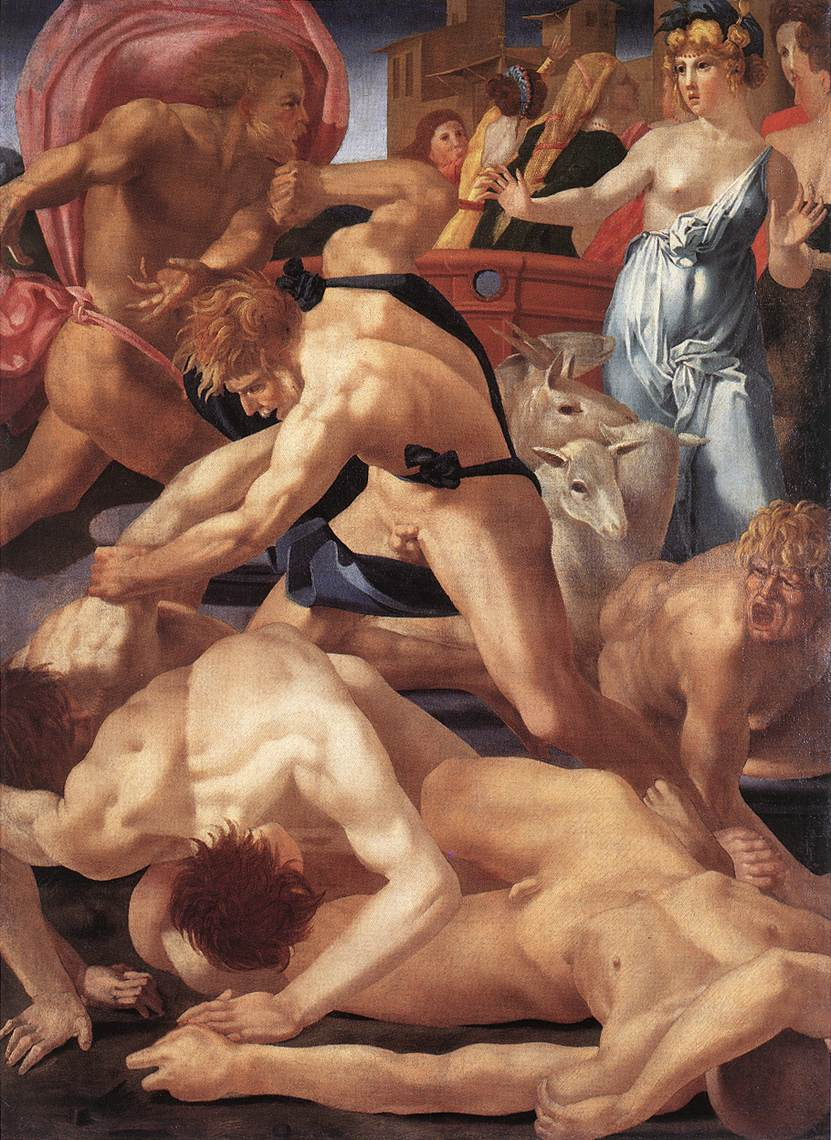
- Artist: Rosso Fiorentino (attribution)
- Year: c. 1523–1524
- Type: Oil on canvas
- Dimensions: 160 cm × 117 cm (63 in × 46 in)
- Location: Uffizi, Florence

Moses Defends Jethro's Daughters is an oil on canvas painting attributed to Italian artist Rosso Fiorentino, created c. 1523–1524, now held in the Uffizi in Florence, which acquired it in 1632. It depicts the Biblical episode when Moses defended the seven daughters of Jethro, who would be his father-in-law.

== History ==
Vasari's Lives of the Artists states the work was produced for Giovanni Bandini as "a canvas with some very handsome ignudi in a story [from the life] of Moses, when he lived in Egypt... and I believe it was commissioned in France". The work was then sent to Francis I of France around 1530 It was already in the Casino di San Marco by 1587 among the goods of don Antonio de' Medici. It was first connected to the reference in Vasari by Gaetano Milanesi It is unclear if the original work was sent to France or, as Antonio Natali theorises, this is a faithful copy.

In fact, it is not excluded that this is not the original, which is possibly lost: the reflectographs of 1995 found an underlying drawing that is not very good, moreover some passages reveal a certain summary, especially in the male bodies, if not a cheap workmanship (the sheep) and with unsolved passages (such as the part between lawn and stone in the middle of the left edge). The same support on canvas, never used by the painter before his stay in France, also raises doubts.

The dating to about 1523 is linked to the coloristic affinities with the Marriage of the Virgin, in the Basilica of San Lorenzo, even if Goldschmidt and Pevsner suggested a slightly later dating, perhaps of the Roman period. The conception of the painting was certainly influenced by the richess of ideas for the nude moving figures in the cartoon of Michelangelo of the now lost Battle of Cascina, and by the expressive force of the also lost The Battle of Anghiari by Leonardo da Vinci, both destined for the Sala del Maggior Consiglio in the Palazzo Vecchio in Florence.

There is a pendant, Rebecca in the Well almost certainly a copy of Rosso attributed to Giovanni Antonio Lappoli, in the National Museum of the Royal Palace, in Pisa

== Description and style ==
The painting represents the biblical episode of Exodus (2:16–22), when the seven daughters of Jethro, a priest of the land of Midian, were harassed by a group of Midianite shepherds as they draw water from a well to water their father's flock. The shepherds wanted to take advantage of the efforts of the young women to give their animals to drink, but the threatening intervention of the young Moses, sitting nearby, made them quit. As a reward, Moses was given one of the girls as his wife, Zipporah.

The life story of Moses was popular in the humanistic circles of Florence because of the "Life of Moses", written by the Jewish author Philo in the 1st century. Rosso had to know the text, retaining its moralizing and philosophical connotation.

The work does have a very original compositional system, in which the prophet has a fully active and violent role in driving away the shepherds. In fact, Moses appears furious and half-naked in the center of the composition, while raging on the bodies of his rivals. According to Mugnaini (1994), the painting would have included two other events of the life of the young Moses, namely the killing of an Egyptian who had attacked a Jewish (ES I, 11–12) and when he intervene to stop a fight between two Jews (ES I, 13–15).

The foreground is a tangle of boldly foreshortened naked bodies, in which the pained grimace of the man on the right stands out, or the anger of the man who is rushing to the left with a veil blown by the wind around his body, a quote of classical art. Probably it is Moses himself, again, who would approach Sephora (with her breasts uncovered and the wet-effect dress that adheres to her skin) announcing the expulsion of the shepherds, while other women run away ignoring what has happened. Nearby there can be seen the sheep and the edge of the well, reachable by a few steps. At the top right, in front of a strip of sky, stands a row of houses. The reclining figure in the foreground, with the violent foreshortening, will be an important source of inspiration for the Florentine Mannerists, such as Bronzino.

The scene is essentially tripartite on three levels, but the complexity of the articulation binds the plans with continuous references, subverting the traditional Renaissance balances. Complementary colors are often juxtaposed and the geometric shapes used in the pictorial surfaces are varied: this contributes to canceling the sense of spatial depth and plasticity of the volumes, in a decidedly anticlassical direction.

In the painting, however, there is the presence of different artists that aren't the original artist himself, perhaps they were necessary to complete unfinished areas, or perhaps they make this a copy of a lost original by Rosso.

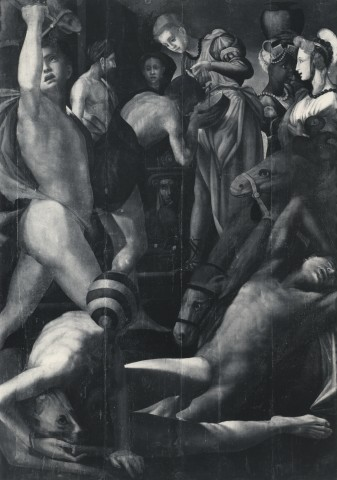
Rebecca at the Well by the same artist
