= Psyche (mythology) =

Wife of Cupid

- Immortal wife of Cupid
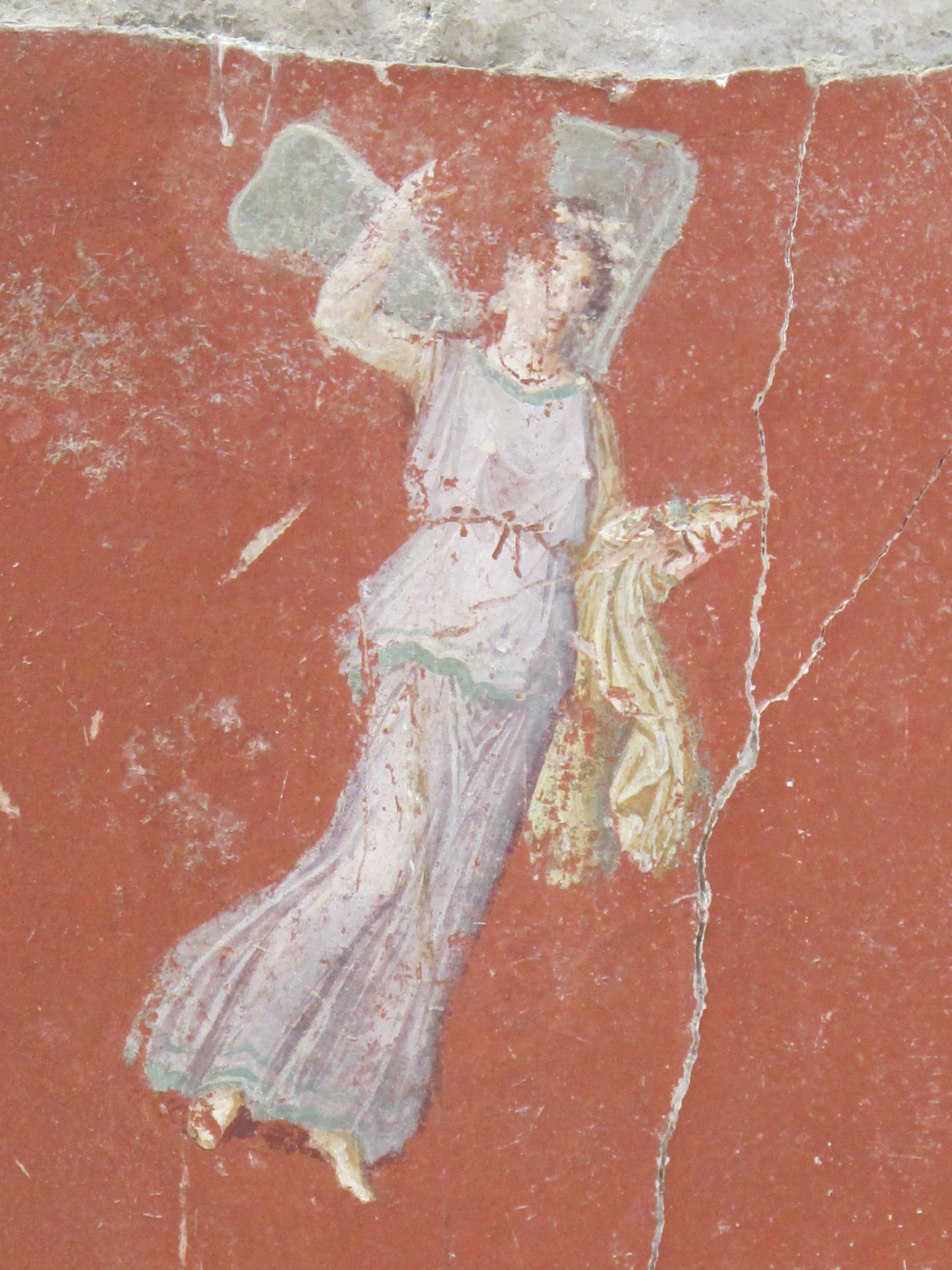
- Psyche on an ancient Roman fresco from Pompeii
- Abode: Mount Olympus
- Symbol: Butterfly wings

Genealogy
- Parents: Unnamed king and queen
- Spouse: Cupid
- Children: Voluptas

In classical mythology, Psyche (/ˈsaɪkiː/; Greek: Ψυχή, romanized: Psykhḗ Ancient Greek: [psyːkʰɛ̌ː]; Greek pronunciation: [psiˈçi]) is the immortal wife of Cupid, Roman god of erotic love and desire. She is often represented as a beautiful woman with butterfly wings.

Psyche is known from the ancient Roman proto-novel The Golden Ass (also known as the Metamorphoses), written by philosopher and orator Apuleius in the 2nd century. In the story, Psyche violates the trust of her new husband, Cupid, and must endure multiple trials at the hand of his mother, Venus, to win him back. At the conclusion of her trials, the couple is reconciled and married, and Psyche is made immortal. Though The Golden Ass is the only known version of Psyche's story from antiquity, the cultural influences of the narrative are depicted in art dating back to the 4th century BCE.

== Name ==
Psyche (Ψυχή) has Greek origins, and is commonly translated as "soul," "life," and "spirit." Homer's usage of the word is often translated as "ghost" (psukhê) and is used to refer to the departed souls that Odysseus meets in the Odyssey. It can also be translated as "butterfly" or "moth" (psukhai). Its relationship with the word psȳ́chein ("to blow," "to breathe," "life-breath") is disputed, and it is unknown if psyche is a derivative.

== The Golden Ass ==
The Golden Ass was written in Latin in the 2nd century CE by Apuleius. The story follows its protagonist, Lucius, who is accidentally transformed into a donkey after experimenting with magic. Along his journey, he is told multiple stories, one of which is the Cupid and Psyche episode, spanning Books 4–6. While the exact origin of this story is unclear, it was likely borrowed from a folktale or now-lost work. Scholars have proposed that the story itself may be of Italian, Greek, North African (specifically Berber), or Iranian origin. Potential sources and inspirations have been named as Lucian, Lucius of Patrae, Aristides, or another unknown author.

== Mythology ==
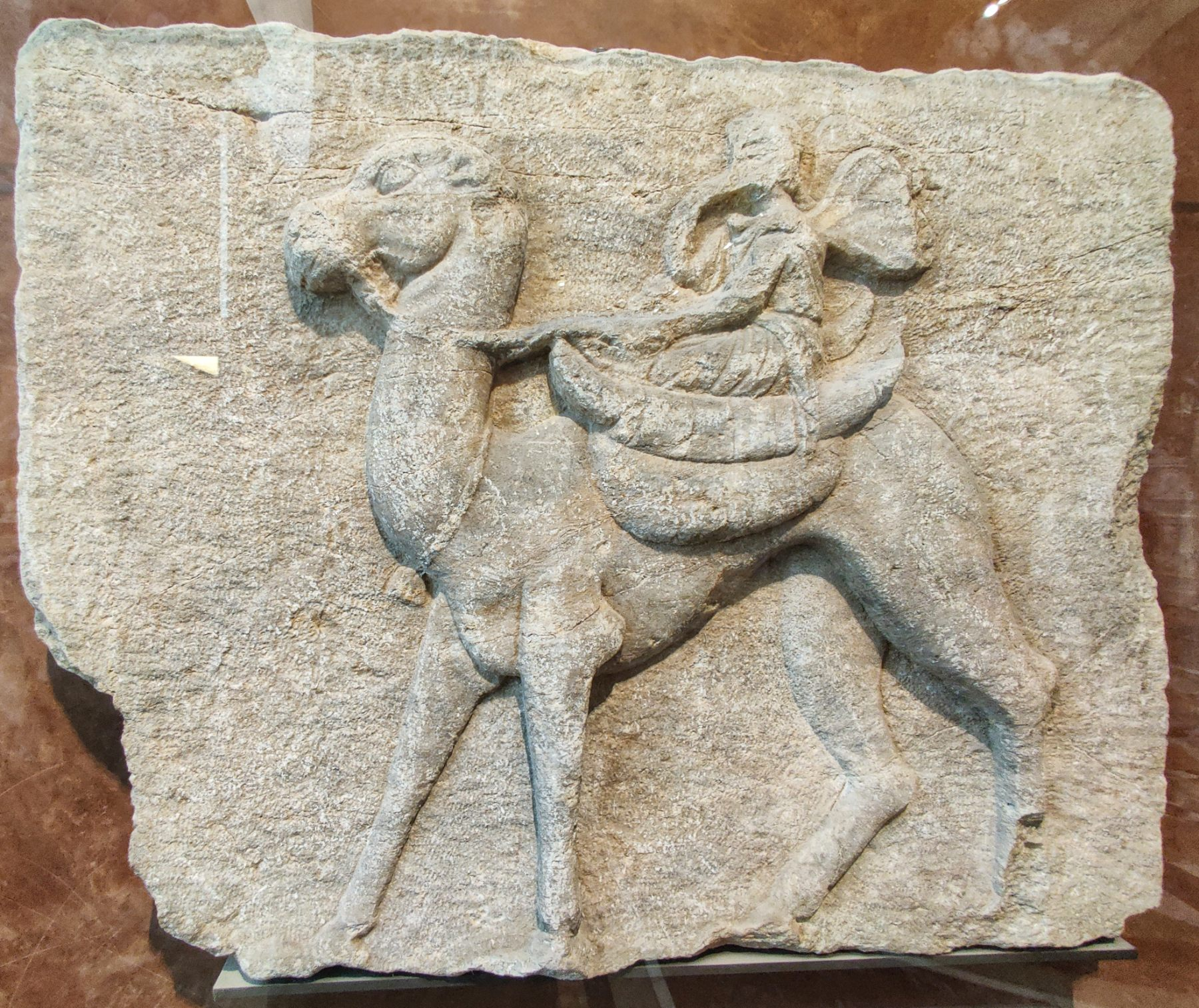
Psyche with butterfly wings mounted on a camel, marble relief at the Louvre

In an unnamed kingdom, a king and queen had three daughters. While all three were beautiful, the youngest, Psyche, possessed a supernatural beauty. As word of her appearance began to spread, huge numbers of people began to arrive in the city to look upon her; some even began to worship her as the goddess Venus or a new earthly version of her. Worshippers began to neglect Venus' temples, offerings, and rites, opting to visit Psyche instead. The goddess was enraged that a mortal was being worshipped over her, and decided to take revenge upon the girl. Venus called upon her son, Cupid, god of desire. Cupid could make anyone fall in love with the prick of his arrow, and she instructed him to shoot Psyche and make her fall in love with a hideous and impoverished man.

=== Relationship with Cupid ===
However, Psyche felt miserable and isolated due to her beauty, and was still unmarried even though her less beautiful sisters had already made advantageous marriages. Psyche's father decided to consult the oracle of Apollo at Miletus, and received a prophesy that Psyche would marry a non-mortal and terrible serpentine monster that even Jupiter would fear and that no men nor god can resist, and that she was to be placed on the top of the mountain in funeral attire to carry out the ceremony. Terrified, Psyche's father obeyed, and she was abandoned on the mountaintop. Zephyrus, the western wind, picked her up and brought her to a meadow in the valley below to meet her new spouse. In some retellings, Cupid is there, only invisible.

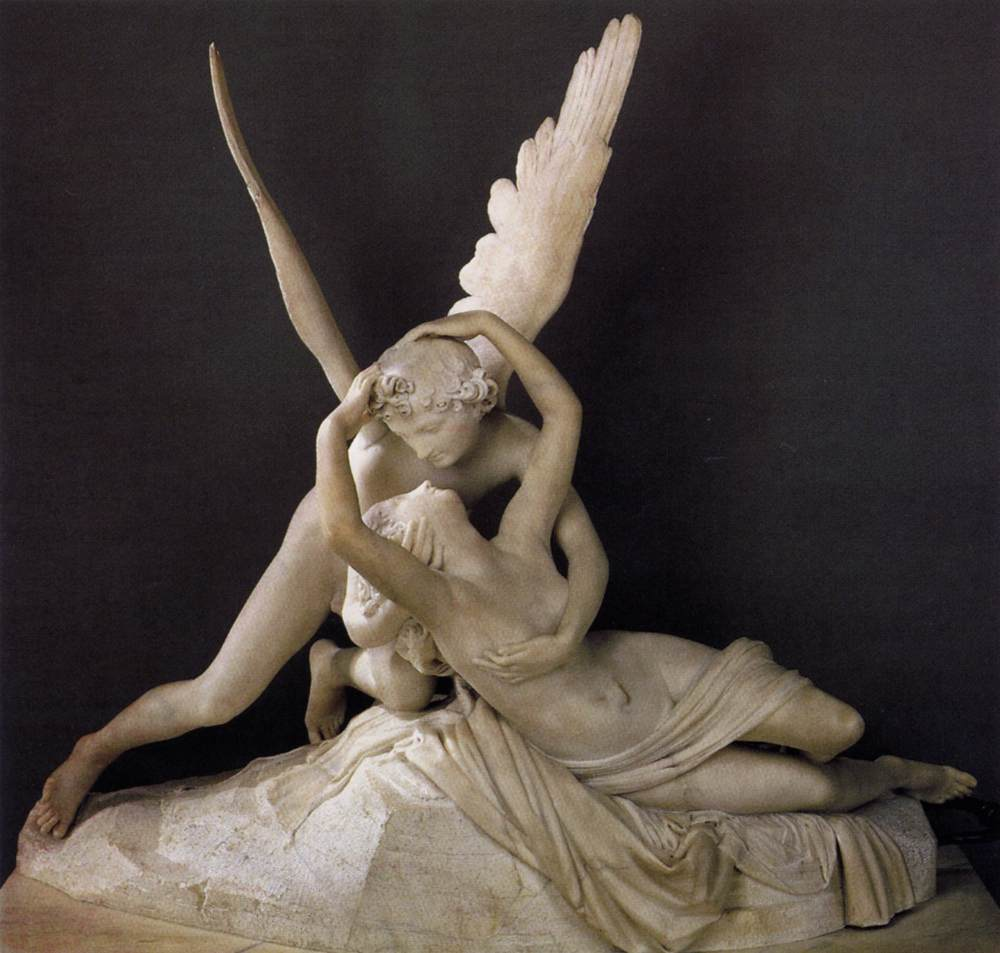
Psyche Revived by Cupid's Kiss, marble sculpture by Antonio Canova

When Psyche explores her surroundings, she finds and enters a beautifully crafted home with bejeweled mosaic floors, carved citron-wood and ivory ceilings supported by gold columns, and silver walls embossed with depictions of animals. A disembodied voice suddenly speaks and informs her that all the treasures in the home are hers, and that she will be cared for by invisible attendants. She is treated to a feast that serves itself and is entertained by an invisible choir and lyre player. That night, when she went to bed, her husband finally arrived. However, he did not greet her. Instead, he took her virginity and left before sunrise without letting her see him. After many weeks of this arrangement, Psyche fell pregnant.

Later, Psyche's sisters learned of what had happened to their sister, they wished to find her and decided to travel to the mountain where the ritual had taken place. Cupid learned of this, and he spoke to Psyche saying: "your sisters, believing you to be dead, are now in their grief following you to the mountain-top and will soon be there. If you should hear their lamentations, do not answer or even look that way, or you will bring about heavy grief for me and for yourself sheer destruction." Psyche promised to follow his orders, but became depressed and inconsolable, refusing to bathe or eat. Cupid was distressed by his wife's condition. Swayed by her pleading, told her that she could see her sisters, but once again warned that their meeting could lead to her ruin, and told her that she could not disclose to her sisters the nature of their relationship, nor be encouraged by them to try and discover his identity. Psyche agreed, and Cupid had Zephyr bring her sisters to the house.

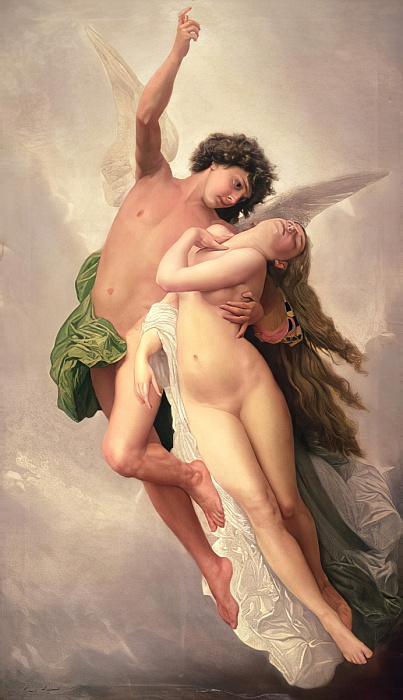
The Abduction of Psyche, painting by Émile Signol

When her sisters arrived, Psyche treated them to the same luxuries she enjoyed when she first arrived. They were amazed by the splendor, and began to envy their sister's position. They asked questions about her husband, and she claimed that he was a young man who spent most of his time hunting and farming. After the sisters left, their envy began to transform to rage; they believed that their sister was undeserving of such a luxurious life, ones that they themselves had been denied in their loveless marriages. They resolved to punish her. However, Cupid was aware of their plots and once again warned Psyche that they would try to persuade her to look upon his face, and told her that if she divulged his secret, their child would be born mortal, but if she did not, he would be born as divine. At their third visit, her sisters reminded Psyche of the oracle's words, and convinced her that Cupid was likely a monster that would eventually destroy her. They instructed her that, while he was sleeping, she should use an oil lamp to look upon his face, then take a blade and cut off his head.

Psyche, although doubtful, was eventually swayed by her sisters' words and looked upon Cupid while he was sleeping. As Psyche shone the light on her husband's face, she realized that he was a god and reprimanded herself for her foolishness. However, as she shifted, a small drop of hot oil fell onto Cupid' shoulder, awakening him. Betrayed by his wife's actions, Cupid took off in flight to take refuge at his mother's house and treat his wound. When Venus discovered that her son had taken Psyche as a lover, she was enraged and vowed to take revenge on her once more.

When Cupid left, the palace disappeared and Psyche found herself in a field near to where her sisters lived. Distraught, Psyche told her sisters of what happened, and they pretended to feel sorry for her. Instead, they were plotting to convince Cupid to take one of them to be his wife. The two traveled to the peak and jumped, thinking Zephyrus would catch them and take them to the palace as he did the last time. Zephyrus, however, knowing what was truly in their hearts, ignored them and the two sisters fell to their deaths.

Distraught and lost, Psyche began to wander across the countryside in search of her lover. She first arrived at the temple of Ceres, and deciding that she should not neglect the worship of any god during her search, organized and cleaned the temple, then prayed to the goddess. Ceres took pity upon Psyche. She appeared to her and informed her of Venus' rage, but was unable to help her in fear of angering Venus. Psyche then left and wandered to a temple of Juno, where she received a similar response: Juno could not help her and betray Venus. Psyche then decided that she needed to find a way to repent before Venus herself.

When Psyche arrived at Venus' home, she was met by the goddess' handmaid, Habit, who seized her by the hair and dragged her in front of the goddess. Venus was ecstatic, and called her handmaids Care (Note: Alternatively translated as 'Sadness') and Sorrow to beat and torture Psyche, after which Venus began to beat Psyche herself, tearing off her clothes and threatening to kill her unborn child. After this, Venus told Psyche that, if she wanted to earn the trust of her son again, then she would need to become her slave and prove her merit by completing impossible tasks.

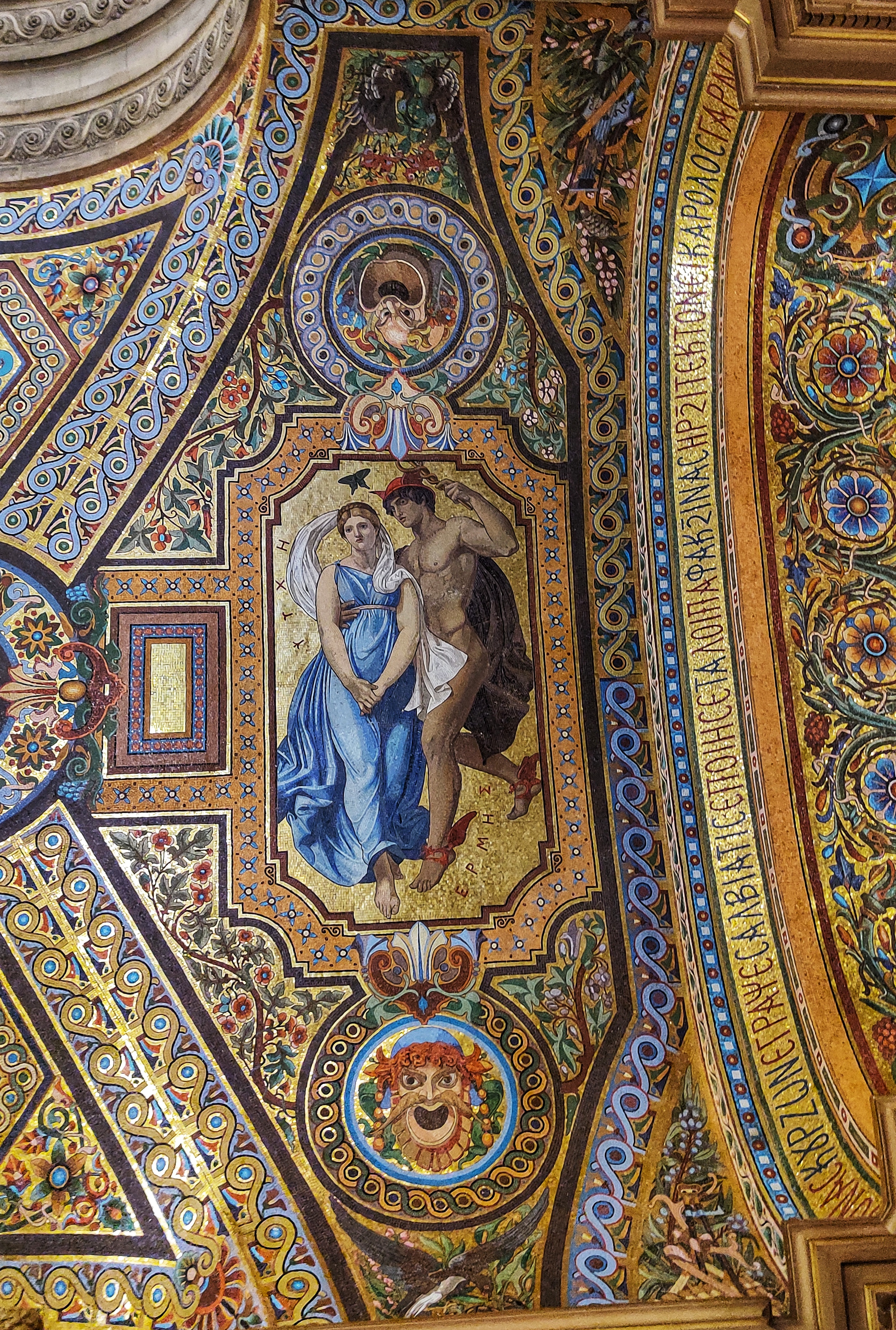
Hermes and Psyche in the Palais Garnier at Paris. Above Psyche's head is a butterfly. Their names are in Greek, ΨΥΧΗ (Psyche) and ΕΡΜΗΣ (Hermes).

=== Psyche's trials ===
==== Sorting grain ====
Venus presented Psyche with a large heap of mixed grains and instructed her to separate and sort them by the time Venus returned from a wedding party that evening. Psyche broke down in despair. However, when an ant saw her in distress and realized the impossibility of the task she had been given, it took pity upon her. It rallied other ants, and, working together, they were able to successfully sort all of the grains before Venus returned. When the goddess saw that Psyche had completed the trial successfully, she was infuriated. She threw the girl a piece of coarse bread and then went to bed, leaving Psyche alone once more.

==== Golden fleece ====
When Venus awoke the next morning, she gave Psyche a new task. She showed the girl a forest and a winding river where rams with golden fleece grazed, and instructed her to retrieve some of their wool. Psyche obeyed, and made her way to the river where she secretly planned to drown herself and end her suffering. However, as she was standing on the riverbank, a divine voice spoke to her from a reed and told her not to go through with her plans. It then informed her that she needed to wait until after the heat of the day passed to retrieve the fleece, as the rams would be enraged by the heat, but would calm down as the weather cooled. Once they were more docile, she could then go to the forest and retrieve some of the wool that had got caught on the branches. Psyche obeyed the voice, and was able to collect a heap of wool to present to the goddess.

==== Waters of the Styx ====
Once that task had been completed, Venus gave Psyche her third task: to gather the black waters from the River Styx in a crystal cup. However, the Styx ran from the top of a mountain cliff that was far too dangerous and difficult for Psyche to climb, and the River itself called out to her, telling her to turn away. One of Jupiter's eagles spotted Psyche and took pity; he took the cup from the girl and collected some of the River's waters for her, thus successfully completing the third task.

==== Journey to the Underworld ====
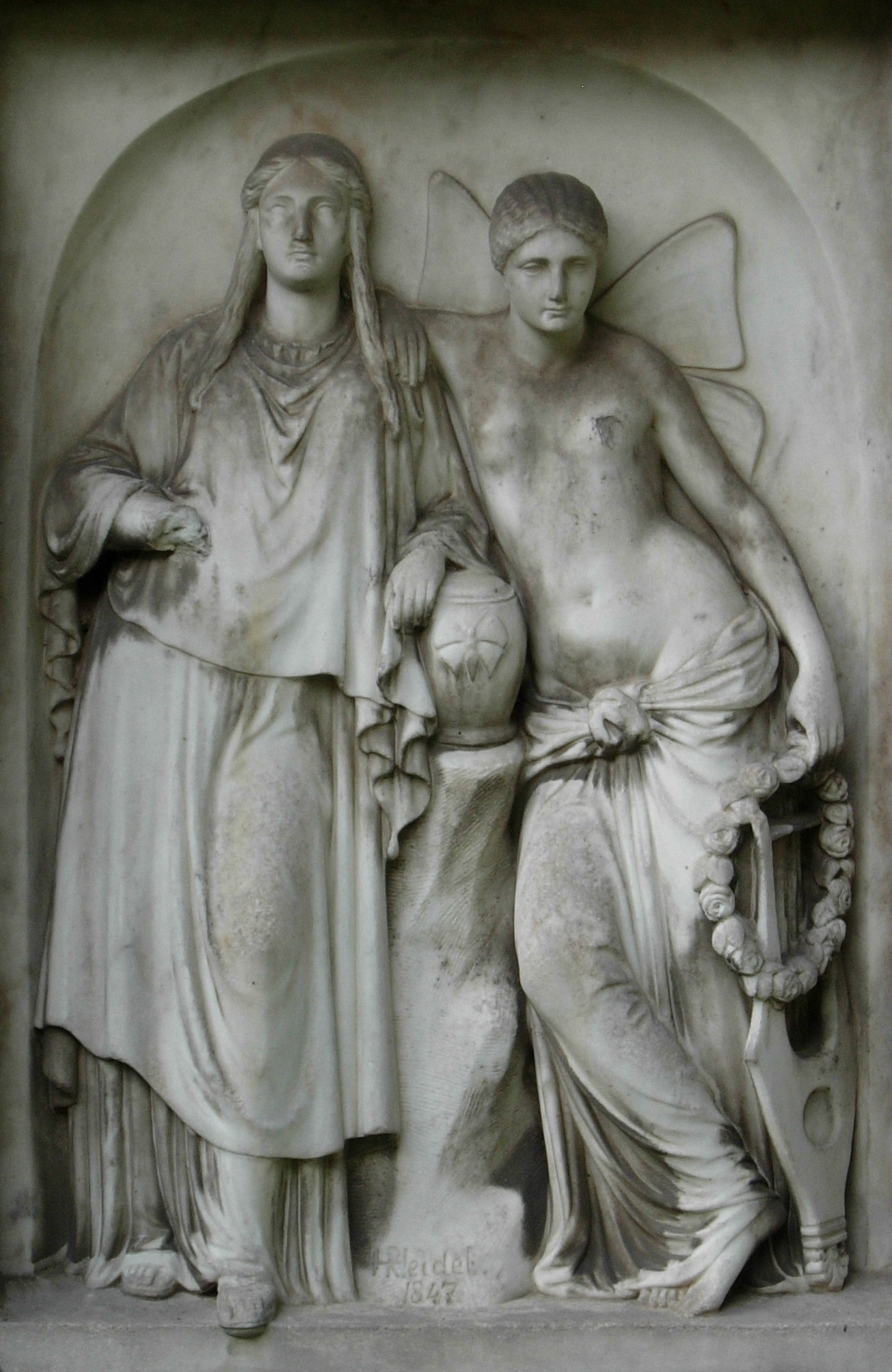
Psyche and Persephone, relief by Hermann Heidel.

Aware that Psyche had been getting help from unknown sources, Venus devised a new task even more difficult than those before. She gave Psyche a box and ordered her to travel to the Orcus, the underworld, to retrieve a piece of beauty from Proserpina, the goddess of spring and queen of the underworld. Psyche, believing that this task was impossible, once again decided to take her own life. She climbed a tall tower and prepared to jump, but the tower spoke and instructed Psyche to go to the border of Sparta where she could find a passageway to the underworld. It then instructed her to carry with her two barley cakes soaked with honey and wine, and place two coins in her mouth; the cakes would be fed to Cerberus so that she could pass by without harm, and the coins would be used to pay for Charon's ferry. It also warned her not to engage with any of the spirits that she may meet, nor open the box under any circumstances. Psyche followed his orders, and upon arriving, Proserpina welcomed Psyche and willingly filled the box with her beauty.

As Psyche exited the underworld, she became curious and decided to take a bit of beauty from the box for herself, believing it might please Cupid. However, instead of beauty, the box contained a black cloud that put her into a deep sleep.

=== The marriage of Psyche and Cupid ===
Around this time, Cupid had fully healed from his injury and took flight to find his love. When he found Psyche, he cleared the cloud of sleep from her body and gently pricked her with an arrow to wake her, saying: "You see how yet again curiosity has been your undoing. But meanwhile you must complete the mission assigned you by my mother with all diligence; the rest I will see to." Psyche obeyed and brought the box to Venus.

Meanwhile, Cupid flew to Jupiter to plead his case. Jupiter agreed to help Cupid in exchange for Cupid's services the next time a beautiful maiden caught his eye, and a deal was made. Jupiter arranged an assembly, sending Mercury, the messenger god, to gather the gods together. At this assembly, Jupiter warned Venus not to ever bring harm to Psyche again before handing the girl the drink of the gods, ambrosia, which granted her immortality and made the pair equal in the eyes of the gods. Afterward, Psyche and Cupid were married and a large celebration and feast commenced. Later, Psyche bore a daughter: Voluptas, the personification of pleasure.

== Interpretations ==
Many interpretations have been made on the story of Cupid and Psyche, among them on the connections between love, trials, and the soul. According to the writer Fulgentius, the story could be read through a Christian lens in which Psyche is compared to Adam because both had curiosities that led them to be banished from paradise. The Italian poet Giovanni Boccaccio proposed that the marriage between Psyche and Cupid could be seen as the bond between the soul and God. Thomas Bulfinch wrote that the soul can be compared to a butterfly, in that the soul can be purified through trials and tribulations, just like a butterfly bursting from its cocoon. Other scholars believe it could be seen as an allegory for the soul's journey for love, while some believe that just like butterflies, the human soul endures pain and change and can still have a happy ending.

=== Gnostic narrative ===
Psyche is featured in the creation myth found in the ancient Gnostic text known as On the Origin of the World. Here she appears as a lover of Eros who pours her blood upon him and also upon the Earth, which causes the first rose to grow from a thorn bush.

== References in art and literature ==
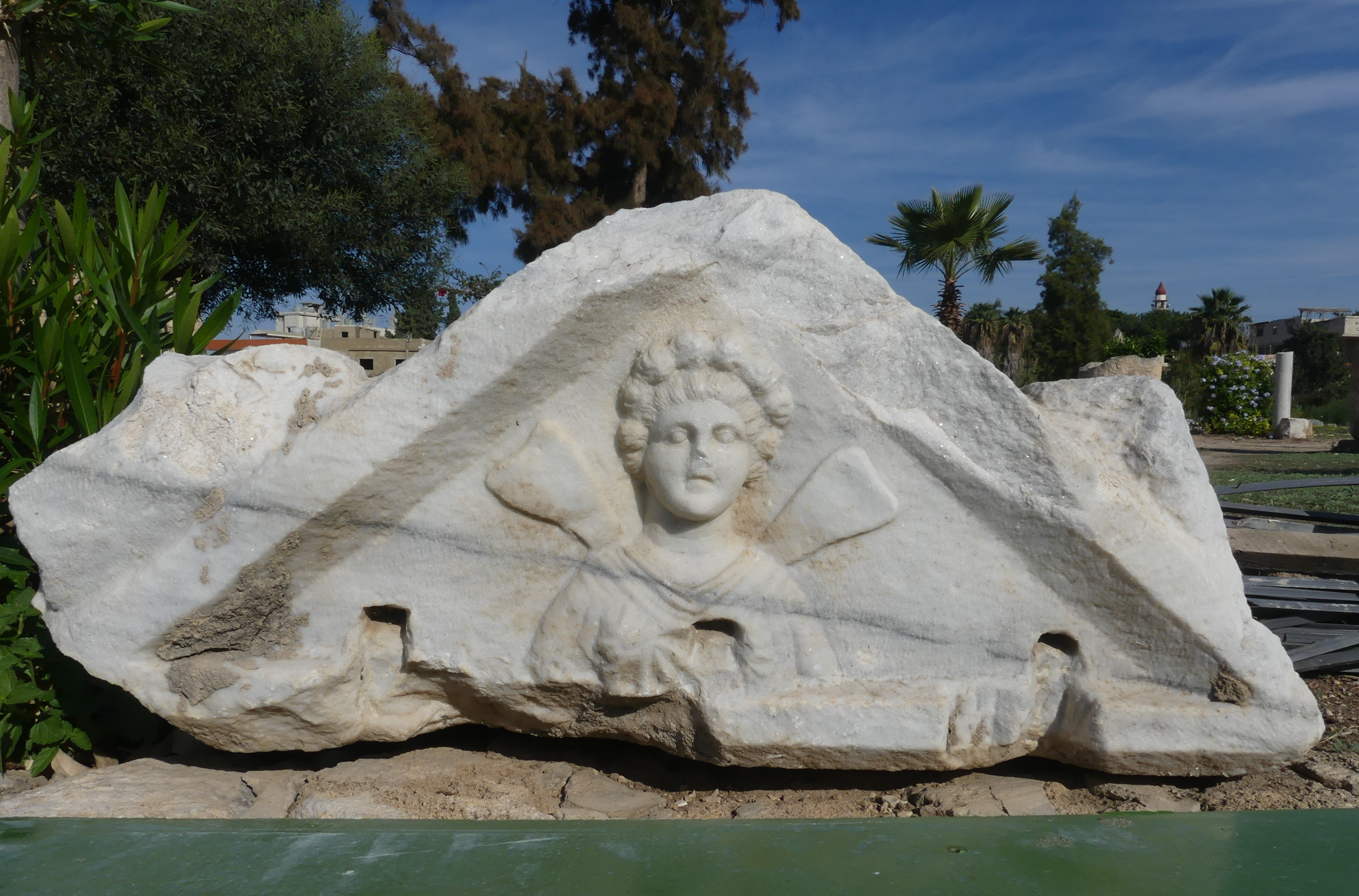
Relief of Psyche on a sarcophagus lid from Tyre, Lebanon.

=== Literature ===
- Love in Color by Bolu Babalola is a collection of works that features a story about Psyche and Eros.
- The Fable Of The Goddess Psyche And Cupid by Lucius Apuleius, translated by T. Taylor (2023).
- Till We Have Faces by C.S. Lewis is not focused on Psyche but instead her sister Orual, giving a different view point of Psyche in myth.
- Cupid: A Tale of Love and Desire by Julius Lester is centered around Cupid in this romantic, light retelling.
- "The Earthly Paradise" by William Morris is an 1868 poem retelling the story of Psyche and Cupid and other myths.
- "Ode to Psyche", a 1819 poem by John Keats, in which the narrator shares his plans to resurrect Psyche.
- Psyche In A Dress by Francesca Lia Block was published in 2006 as a contemporary retelling of the Psyche myth in poetic prose.

=== Paintings, sculptures, and engravings ===
- The Wedding Feast of Cupid and Psyche painting by Raphael, 1517.
- Psyche Revived by Cupid's Kiss sculpture by Antonio Canova, 1787.
- Rings from Roman Britain engraved with images of the two lovers
- Psyche's Wedding painting by Edward Burne-Jones, 1895.
- Cupid and Psyche painting by François Gérard, 1798.
- Bacchus, Venus, and Cupid painting by Rosso Fiorentino, 1531.
- Psyche sculpture by Hiram Powers, 1848.
- Psyche Abandoned sculpture by Pietro Tenerani, 1819.
- Psyche sculpture by Bertel Thorvaldsen, 1806.

=== Other references ===
- Comus masque by John Milton alludes to Psyche's story.
- The astronomer Annibale de Gasparis named an asteroid found in 1852 after Psyche.
- NASA has sent a satellite of the same name to study the asteroid.
- "Eve, Psyche & the Bluebeard's Wife," 2023 song by Le Sserafim
- Psyche, a semi-opera by Matthew Locke

== See also ==
- Cupid and Psyche
- Cupid
- Venus
