= Dei Altarpiece =

Painting by Rosso Fiorentino

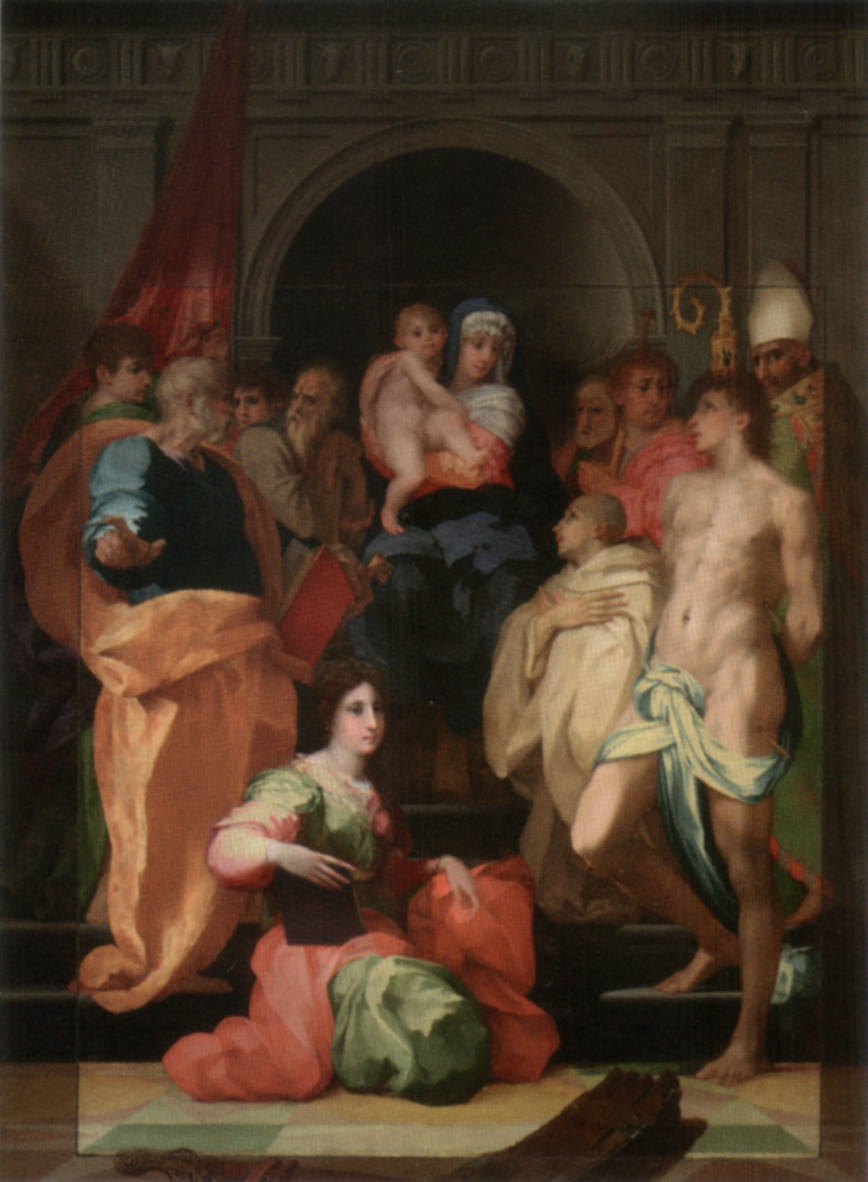
Dei Altarpiece (1522) by Rosso Fiorentino

The Dei Altarpiece is an oil on panel painting by Rosso Fiorentino, commissioned in 1509 by the Dei family and completed in 1522. It is now in Florence's Galleria Palatina, whilst the Uffizi holds a preparatory drawing which may be the original idea for the work.

Originally commissioned by Carlo Dei's son Ranieri to replace Raphael's Madonna of the Baldacchino (left unfinished on his departure from Florence in 1508) as the altarpiece for the Dei family chapel in Santo Spirito, the work was praised for its lively colouring in Vasari's Lives of the Artists. Around the end of the 17th century it came to the attention of grand prince Ferdinando de' Medici who took it to the Palazzo Pitti and had a copy made for the chapel. It was mentioned in the early 18th century Palazzo Pitti inventory with its original measurements. 50 cm was later added to all four of its sides and a gilded intaglio Baroque-style frame added, both of which were in place when Giuseppe Richa saw it in 1761.

It takes inspiration from Madonna of the Baldacchino, especially in the group of saints gathered around the Madonna and Child, all of them name-saints of the Dei family. They are usually identified as:

- Saint Peter (blue and yellow robe, with keys and a book)
- Bernard of Clairvaux (white habit, kneeling on the steps)
- Rainerius
- Augustine of Hippo (in bishop's vestments)
- Roch or James the Great
- Sebastian (semi-nude, with arms tied behind his back)
- Joseph
- Maurice
- seated female saint (the broken wheel and sword next to her are 18th century additions meant to link her to Catherine of Alexandria)

== Bibliography (in Italian) ==
- Marco Chiarini, Galleria palatina e Appartamenti Reali, Sillabe, Livorno 1998. ISBN 978-88-86392-48-8
- Antonio Natali, Rosso Fiorentino, Silvana Editore, Milano 2006. ISBN 88-366-0631-8
- Elisabetta Marchetti Letta, Pontormo, Rosso Fiorentino, Scala, Firenze 1994. ISBN 88-8117-028-0
