= Marriage of the Virgin (Rosso Fiorentino) =

1523 painting by Rosso Florentino

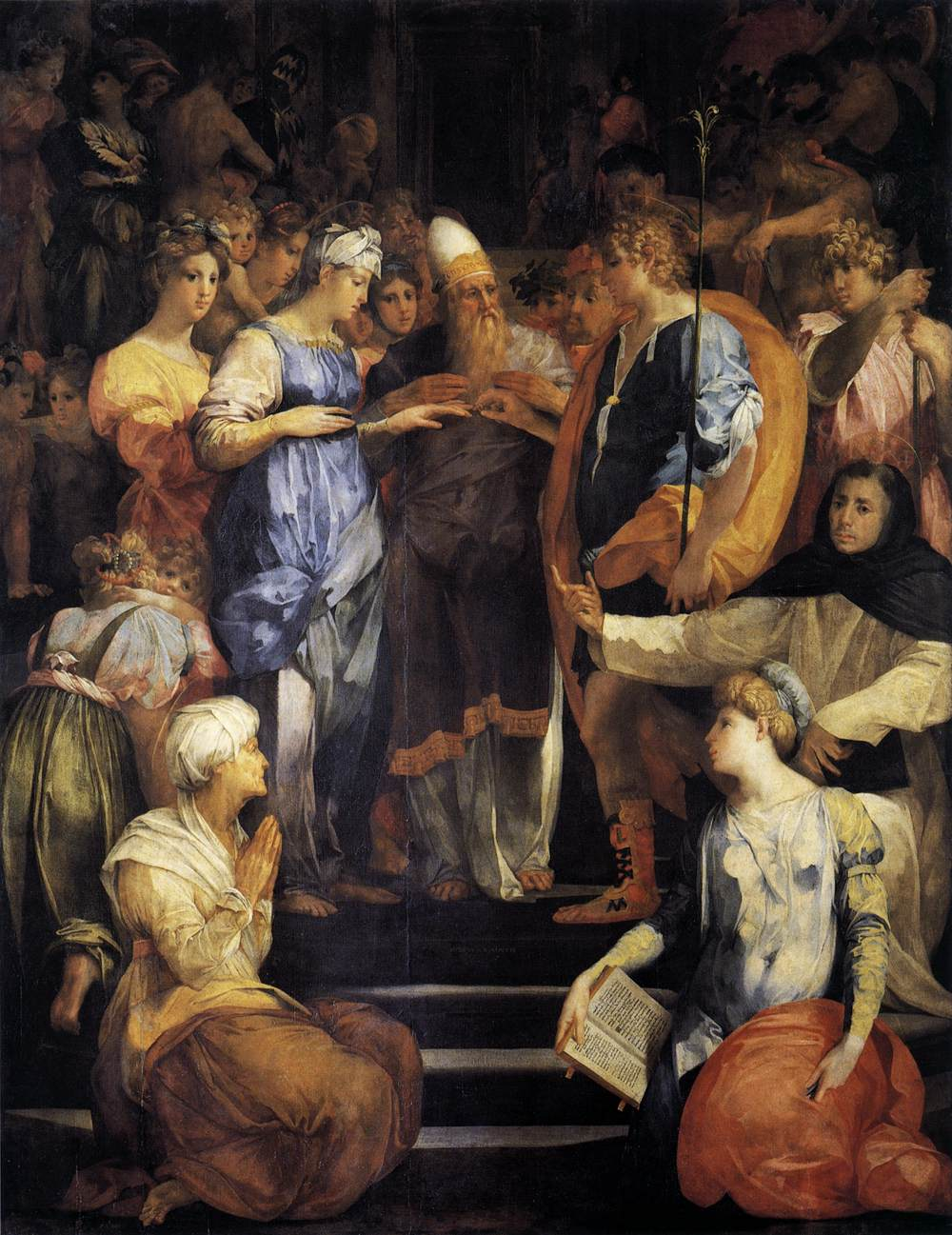
- Artist: Rosso Fiorentino
- Year: 1523
- Medium: oil on panel
- Dimensions: 325 × 250 cm
- Location: Basilica of San Lorenzo, Florence

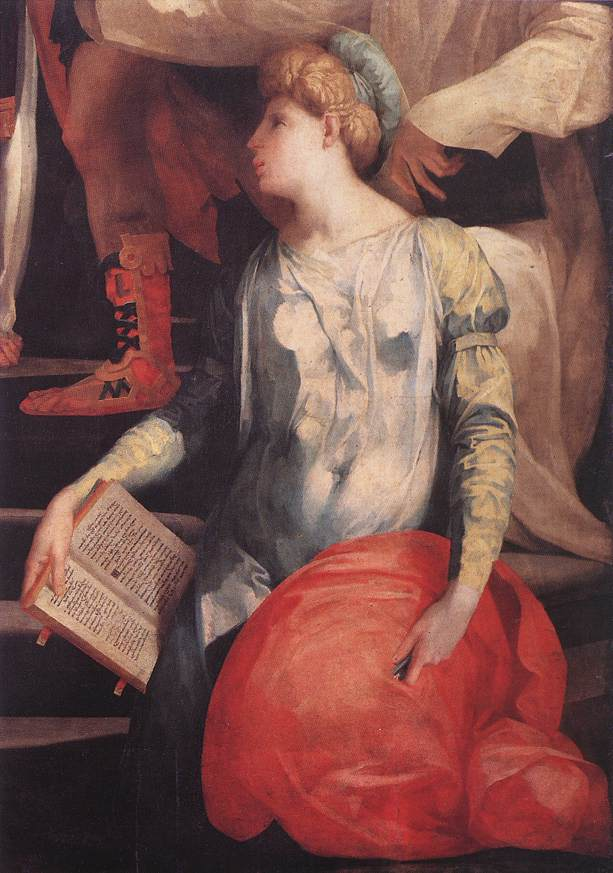
Detail

Marriage of the Virgin or the Ginori Altarpiece is a 1523 oil on panel painting by Rosso Fiorentino, signed and dated by the artist. It was commissioned by Carlo Ginori for the chapel dedicated to the Virgin Mary and Saint Joseph, in the Basilica of San Lorenzo, in Florence, previously owned by the Masi family that chapel had been acquired by the Ginori family in 1520. It still hangs in the Basilica, whilst a drawn copy attributed to Antonio Circignani is now in the Louvre (n.1592).

Five figures kneel on the steps up to the main scene, with two putti and an old female saint (perhaps Saint Anne) to the left and a Dominican saint (possibly Vincent Ferrer and possibly a portrait of the painting's commissioner) and a young female saint with a book (Saint Apollonia).

== Description and style ==
The scene is crowded and set symmetrically, with Joseph in the center, with the flowered mace, who is putting the ring on Mary, as they are being blessed by the priest behind them. Abandoning the iconographic tradition, Joseph is represented as a handsome young man, rather than elderly and therefore incapable of affecting Mary's virginity. Such a revolutionary choice has always interested scholars and the only possible explanation found so far is that it wants to symbolically represent the renovatio ecclesiae promoted by Leo X and carried forward by Clement VII. However, it cannot be ruled out that this was a choice by the author, an artist bordering on the irreverent, not to mention in some cases almost blasphemous. Saint Joseph has been defined as resembling David, by Donatello, according to an inspiration also found in other works by the artist.

The main scene takes place at the top of some steps, at the sides of which there are some figures: two cherubs embracing each other, a Dominican monk saint pointing to the scene, perhaps Saint Vincent Ferrer (which perhaps contains the portrait of the client), an elderly saint (perhaps St. Anna) and the young saint with the book (Saint Apollonia), who is holding something metallic in her hand, perhaps a key. The identification of most of the figures remains uncertain.

The gazes and gestures of these figures direct them in depth towards the central scene, according to a scheme that goes beyond the traditional pyramidal shape, transforming it into something more complex, in spaces welded within two opposing semicircles. The crowding was interpreted as "a joyful party populated by various guests".

The palette is lively and iridescent, typical of mannerist experimentation, and with its darkening in depth it helps to perceive spatial depth.

The frescoes by Pontormo and Franciabigio in the Chiostrino dei Voti have been indicated as sources of inspiration for the composition, in particular the Visitazione, with a similar stepped structure figures arranged in a crescent shape around the centre, and the Marriage of the Virgin, with the similar figure of the priest and the architectural backdrop located just behind the figures. New, for example compared with earlier works such as the Dei Altarpiece, is the consistency of the colour, which has become dazzling and rich in iridescent reflections, perhaps due to the influence of Perin del Vaga, who had just returned from Rome.
