= Holy Family with the Infant Saint John the Baptist (Rosso Fiorentino) =

Painting by Rosso Fiorentino

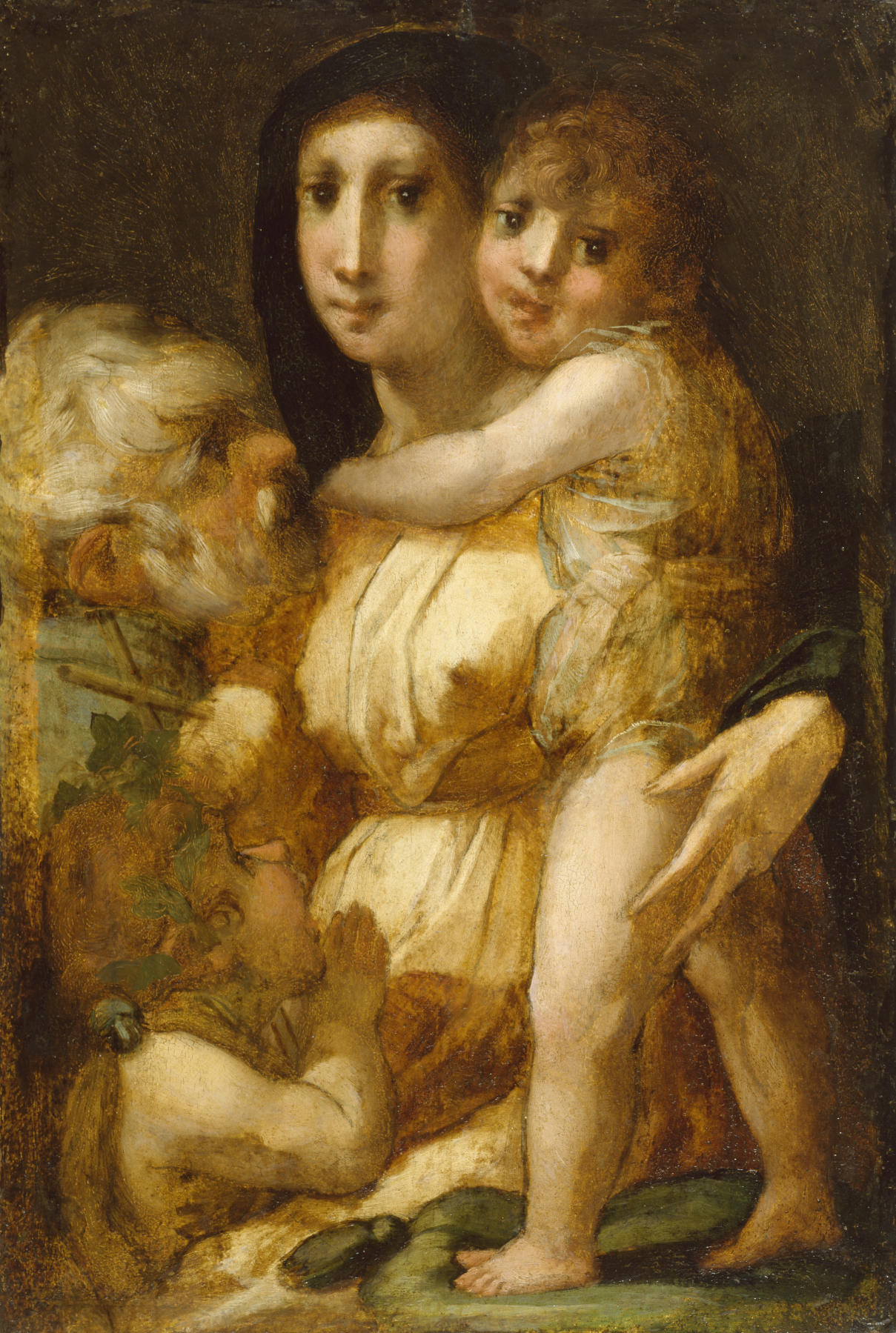
Holy Family with the Infant Saint John the Baptist (c. 1521) by Rosso Fiorentino

Holy Family with the Infant Saint John the Baptist is an unfinished c. 1521 oil on panel painting by Rosso Fiorentino, produced early in his stay in Volterra. The work is now in the Walters Art Museum in Baltimore.

== History and description ==
The devotional altarpiece, unfinished, is usually referred to the early 1520s, at the beginning of the stay in Volterra, due to the close connection with the Villamagna Altarpiece. It shows the Madonna holding the Child standing on a green cushion, placed near the lower edge of the table, while on the left St. Joseph and St. John the Baptist turn towards the Savior, with a very accentuated rotation. The impulse of the Child embracing his mother recalls the Madonna of the Harpies by Andrea del Sarto (1517). The presence of Donatellesque stylistic features have been related to a possible frequentation of Jacopo Sannazzaro in a hypothetical Neapolitan trip of those years.

Typical of the artist are the watery eyes, the restless contour line, the lively and dynamic brushstroke, the tapering of some anatomical details, such as the elegant hand of the Virgin.
