= Portrait of a Young Man Seated on a Carpet =

Painting by Rosso Fiorentino

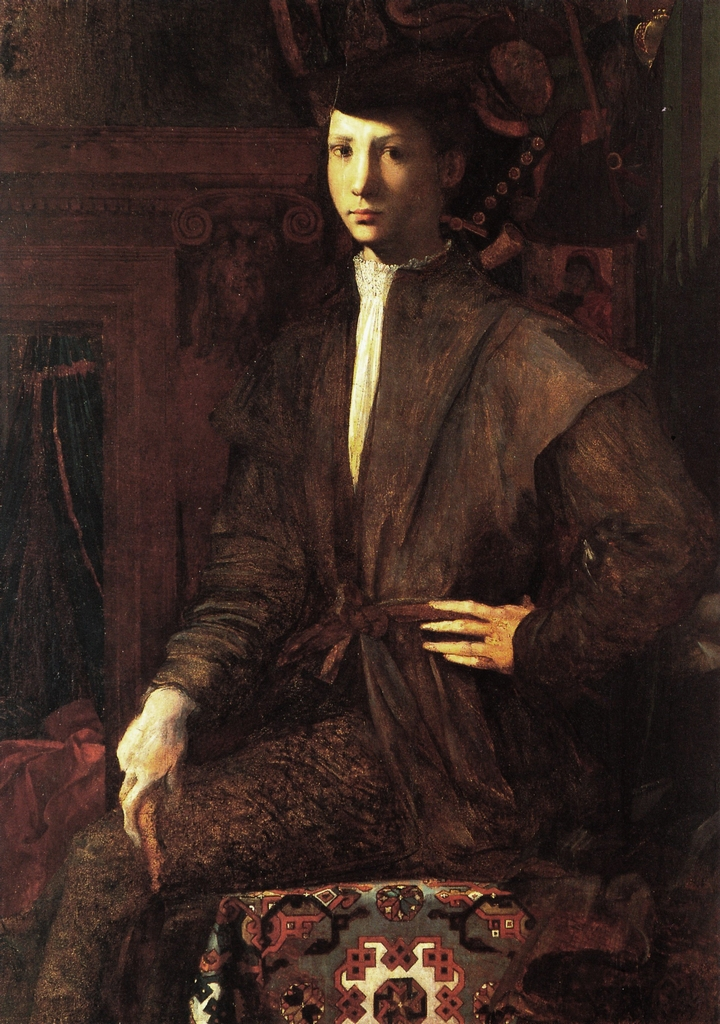
- Artist: Rosso Fiorentino
- Year: c. 1525-1527
- Medium: oil on panel
- Dimensions: 120 by 86 centimetres (47 in × 34 in)
- Location: National Museum of Capodimonte, Naples

Portrait of a Young Man Seated on a Carpet is an oil on panel painting by the Italian Mannerist painter Rosso Fiorentino, from c. 1525-1527. It is held in the National Museum of Capodimonte, in Naples. The identity of its subject is unknown.

It may have been produced during or just after Rosso's stay in Castello di Cerveteri, home to the Anguillara, a ducal branch of the Orsini family. It was recorded in a 1600 inventory which attributed it to Rosso, but it was misattributed around 1650 to Titian. It later entered the Farnese collection in Parma as a work by Parmigianino, with the Farnese's librarian Orsini acting as an intermediary - it is also known to have previously been in his collection. It was brought to Naples with most of the rest of the Farnese collection in 1739 but was only reattributed to Rosso in 1940 thanks to Roberto Longhi.
