= Spedalingo Altarpiece =

Painting by Rosso Fiorentino

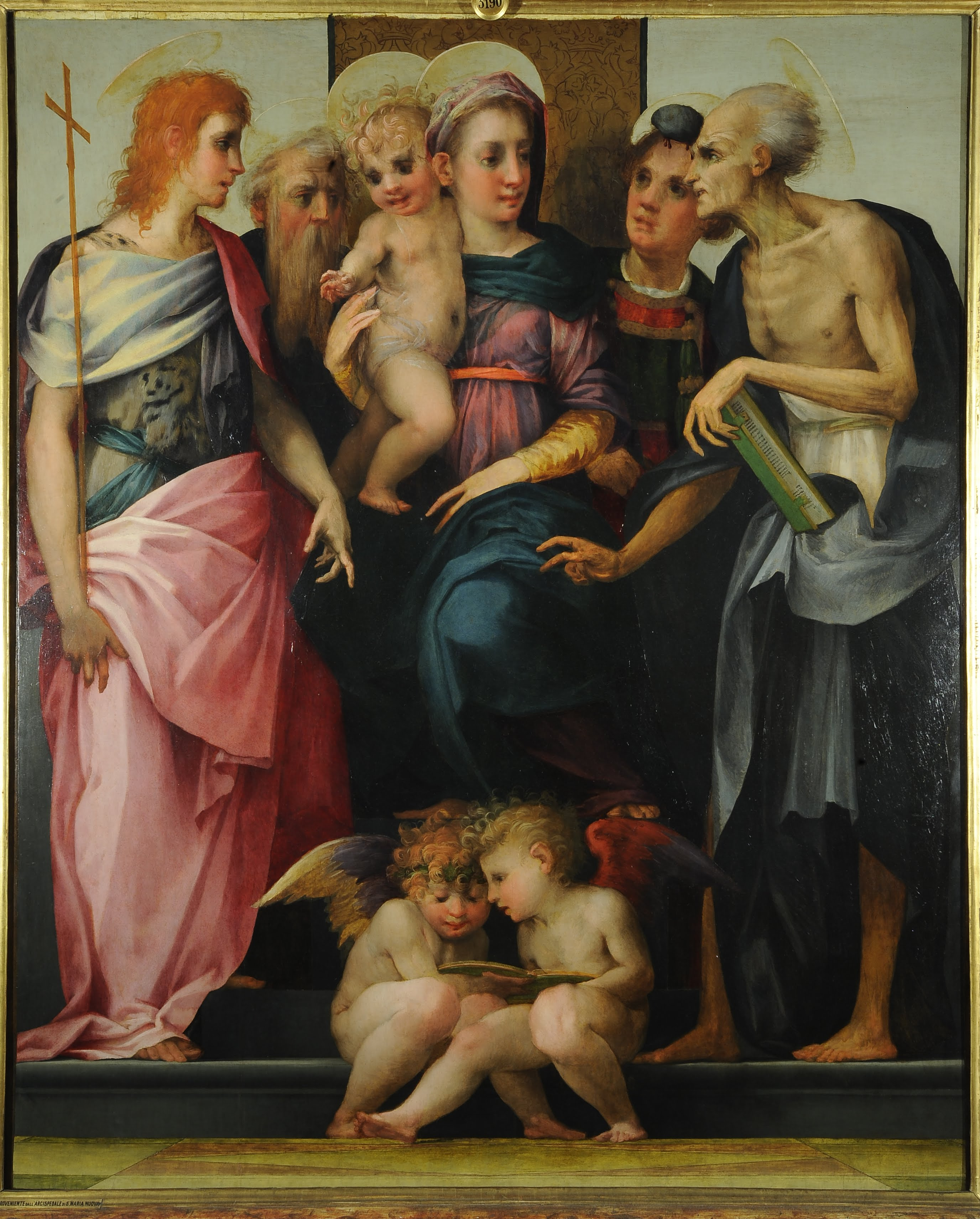
Spedalingo Altarpiece (1518) by Rosso Fiorentino

The Spedalingo Altarpiece or Ognissanti Altarpiece is a 1518 oil-on-panel painting by Rosso Fiorentino, now in the Uffizi in Florence, which acquired it in 1900. It was commissioned by Leonardo Buonafede, "spedalingo" (i.e. rector) of the Hospital of Santa Maria Nuova in Florence. The contract was dated 30 January 1518. The painting was intended for the St John the Baptist chapel in Ognissanti, according to the will of Francesca de Ripoi, a Catalan widow.

To the left are John the Baptist (patron of Florence and of the chapel) and Antony the Great, while to the right are Saint Stephen (patron saint of the chiesa di Grezzano, with one of the stones used in his martyrdom embedded in his head) and Jerome (with a book).

== Sources ==
- Elisabetta Marchetti Letta, Pontormo, Rosso Fiorentino, Scala, Firenze 1994. ISBN 88-8117-028-0
- "Polo Museale Fiorentino - Catalogo delle opere". polomuseale.firenze.it.
