= Bacchus, Venus and Cupid =

Painting by Rosso Fiorentino

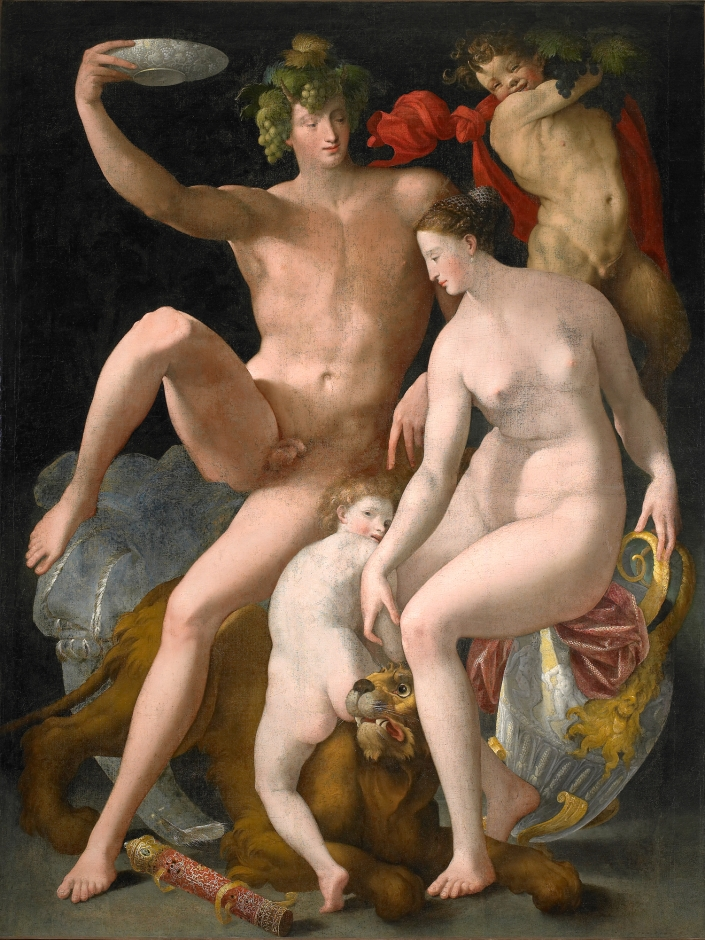
Bacchus, Venus and Cupid (1531-1532), attributed to Rosso Fiorentino

Bacchus, Venus and Cupid is a 1531–1532 oil-on-canvas painting attributed to the Italian Mannerist painter Rosso Fiorentino, now in the National Museum of History and Art in Luxembourg.

In two editions of Lives of the Artists, Vasari described Cupid and Psyche and Bacchus and Venus, two mythological oil paintings produced for Francis I of France by Fiorentino. In the first edition (1550) he recorded that the paintings were produced soon after the painter's arrival in France in 1530 and before Primaticcio's arrival two years later. They were both displayed at the end of the Francis I Gallery at Fontainebleau Palace.

Almost nothing is known of the painting Vasari called Cupid and Psyche, though it may relate to a Cupid and Venus for which a preparatory drawing survives in the Louvre. Béguin cautiously identified the Luxembourg work as the Bacchus and Venus mentioned by Vasari. Its poor-to-moderate condition means that it cannot be directly attributed to Fiorentino nor to any of his Fontainebleau collaborators, meaning that the theory that it is an autograph work by Fiorentino has been taken up and developed.

== Bibliography ==
- (in Italian) Antonio Natali, Rosso Fiorentino, Silvana Editore, Milano 2006. ISBN 88-366-0631-8
