= Volterra Deposition =

Painting by Rosso Fiorentino

Deposition from the Cross
- Deposizione (Italian)
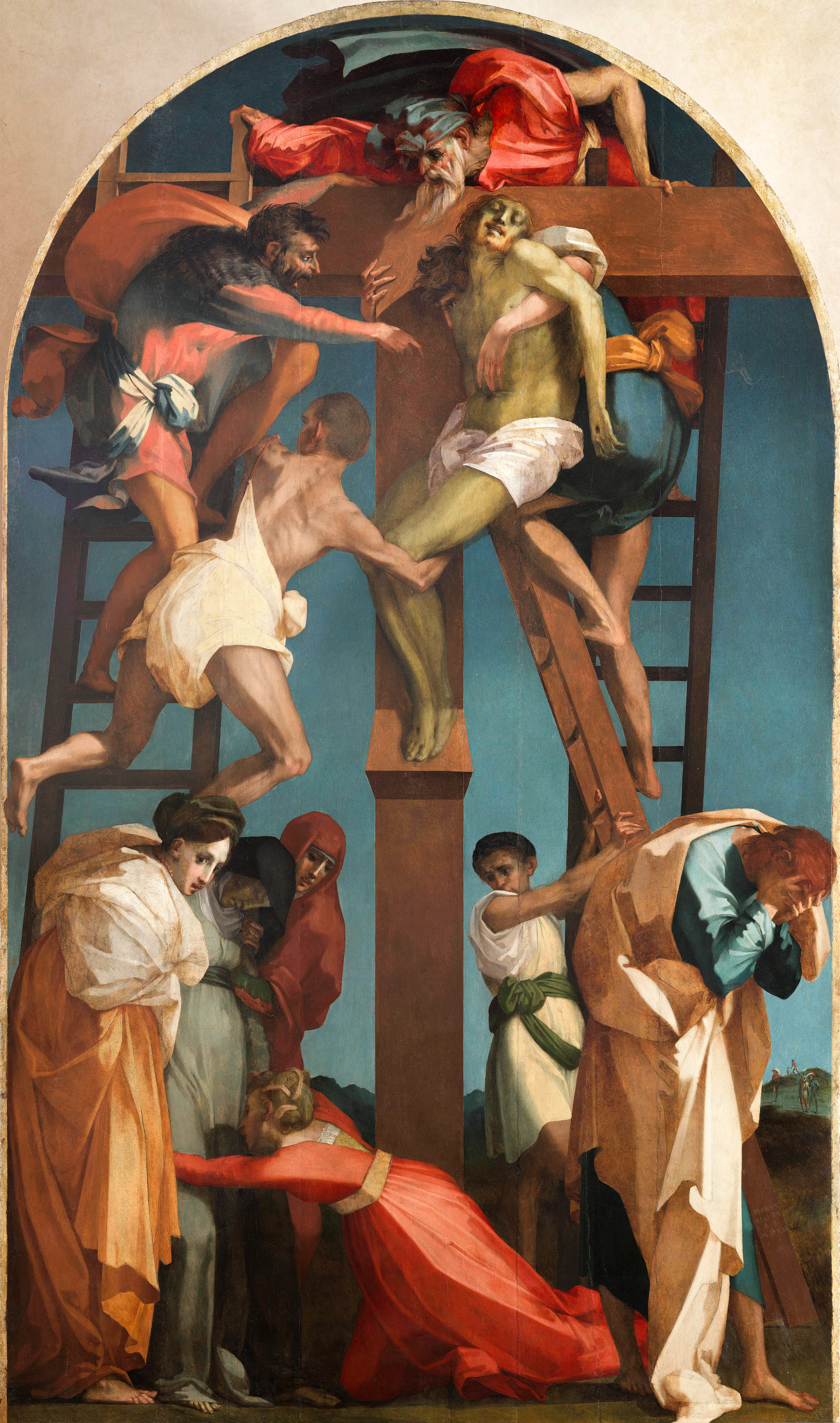
- Artist: Rosso Fiorentino
- Year: c. 1521
- Type: Oil on wood
- Dimensions: 375 cm × 196 cm (148 in × 77 in)
- Location: Pinacoteca Comunale, Volterra

The Deposition from the Cross is an altarpiece, completed in 1521, depicting the Deposition of Christ by the Italian Renaissance painter Rosso Fiorentino. The painting is dated and signed: RUBEUS FLOR. A.S. MDXXI. It is broadly considered to be the artist's masterpiece. Painted in oil on wood, the painting was previously located in the Duomo of Volterra, but has been moved to the town art gallery, Pinacoteca Comunale.

== Interpretation ==
This painting has often been compared to the fellow Mannerist painter Pontormo's treatment of the same subject. His Deposition canvas in Florence is contemporaneous (1528) with Fiorentino's.

Unlike Pontormo's bright coloration and unitary collection of billowing figures, the Fiorentino depiction has two arenas: above is a group of figures on ladders, removing the crucified Christ, while below, the women and men are subsumed in grief. Mary, pale and downcast, collapses in the arms of two women. Mary Magdalen in bright red, swoons to hug the Madonna's legs. A grief-stricken apostle turns his face away. The somber landscape is virtually barren. One reviewer describes the scene as "violent suffering ...rendered by extreme expression, the concatenation of angular bodies, and the dazzling light that sharply draws clear folds on the clothing." Another states that this is the prototype of early-Mannerism, with "no logical spatial connection between the figures, the cross and ladders; the size of the figures appears arbitrarily chosen, and their elongated bodies and small heads" distort classical proportions.

Rosso would go on to paint a second, darker and more crowded Deposition for the church of San Lorenzo, Sansepolcro in Sansepolcro.

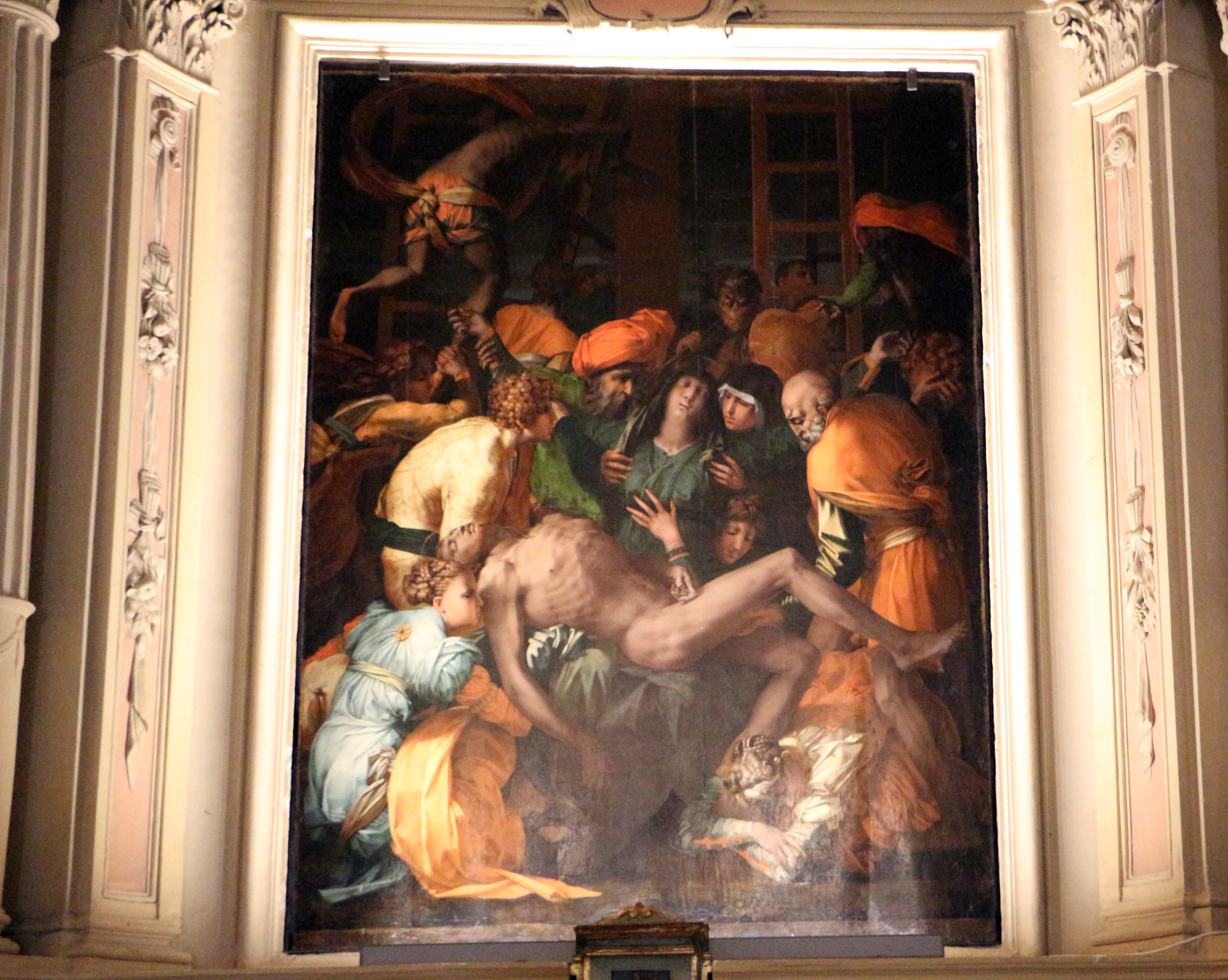
Sansepolcro Deposition by Fiorentino
