= Antonio Natali (art historian) =

Antonio Natali (born 1951) is an Italian art historian, academic and museum director. Born in Piombino, he headed several departments at the Uffizi from 1981 onwards before becoming its director from 2006 until 2015.

He and Carlo Falciani curated three exhibitions on 16th century Florentine art at the Palazzo Strozzi. From 2000 to 2010, he taught museology at the University of Perugia. In 2006, he became professor of modern art history at Milan Poytechnic. He is now an advisor at the Opera del Duomo di Firenze and an independent curator.
