= Rosso Fiorentino =

Italian painter

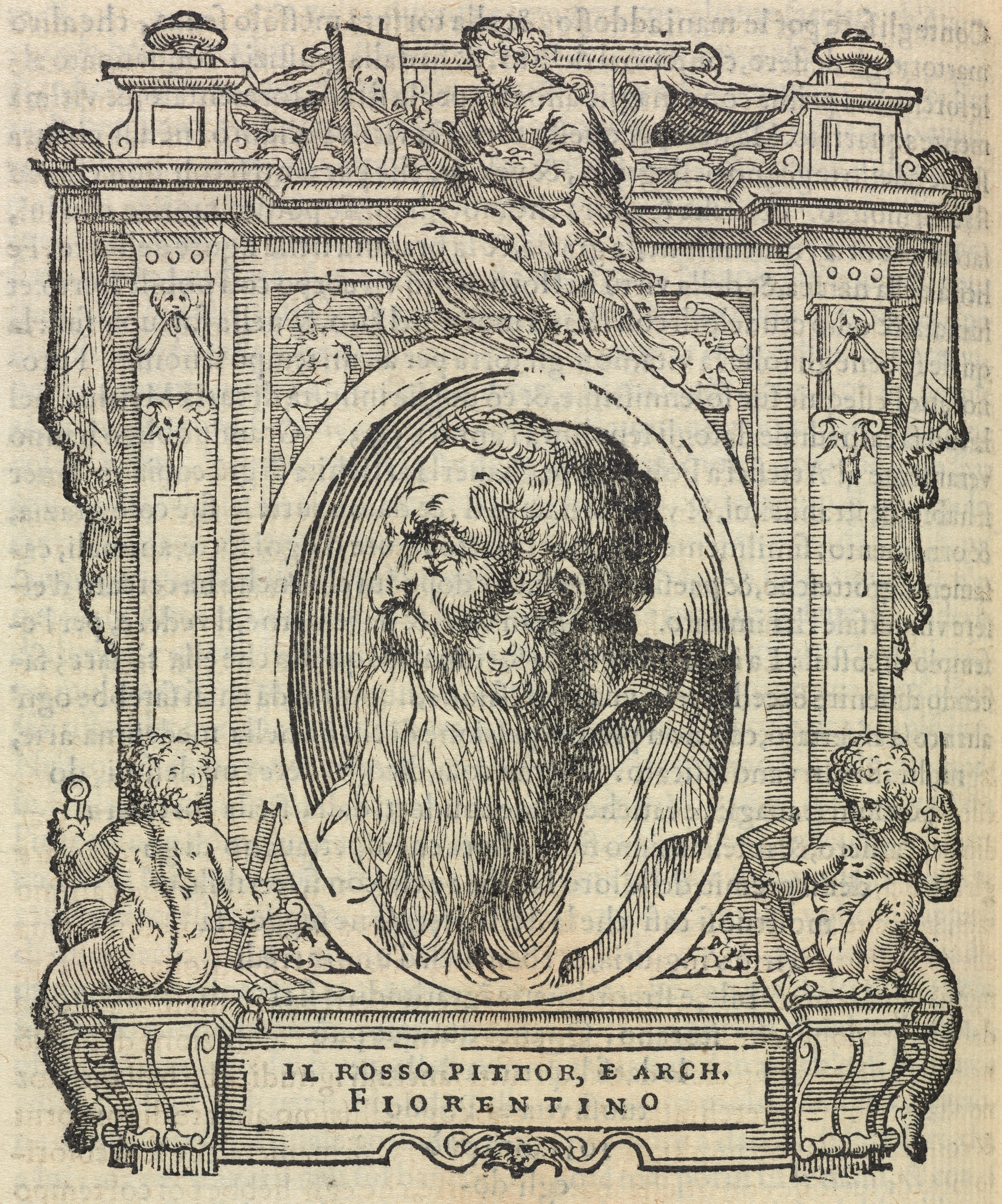
- Rosso Fiorentino, in the Lives of Giorgio Vasari
- Born: Giovanni Battista di Jacopo; 8 March 1495; Florence, Republic of Florence
- Died: 14 November 1540 (aged 45); Fontainebleau, Kingdom of France
- Known for: Painting
- Movement: Mannerism

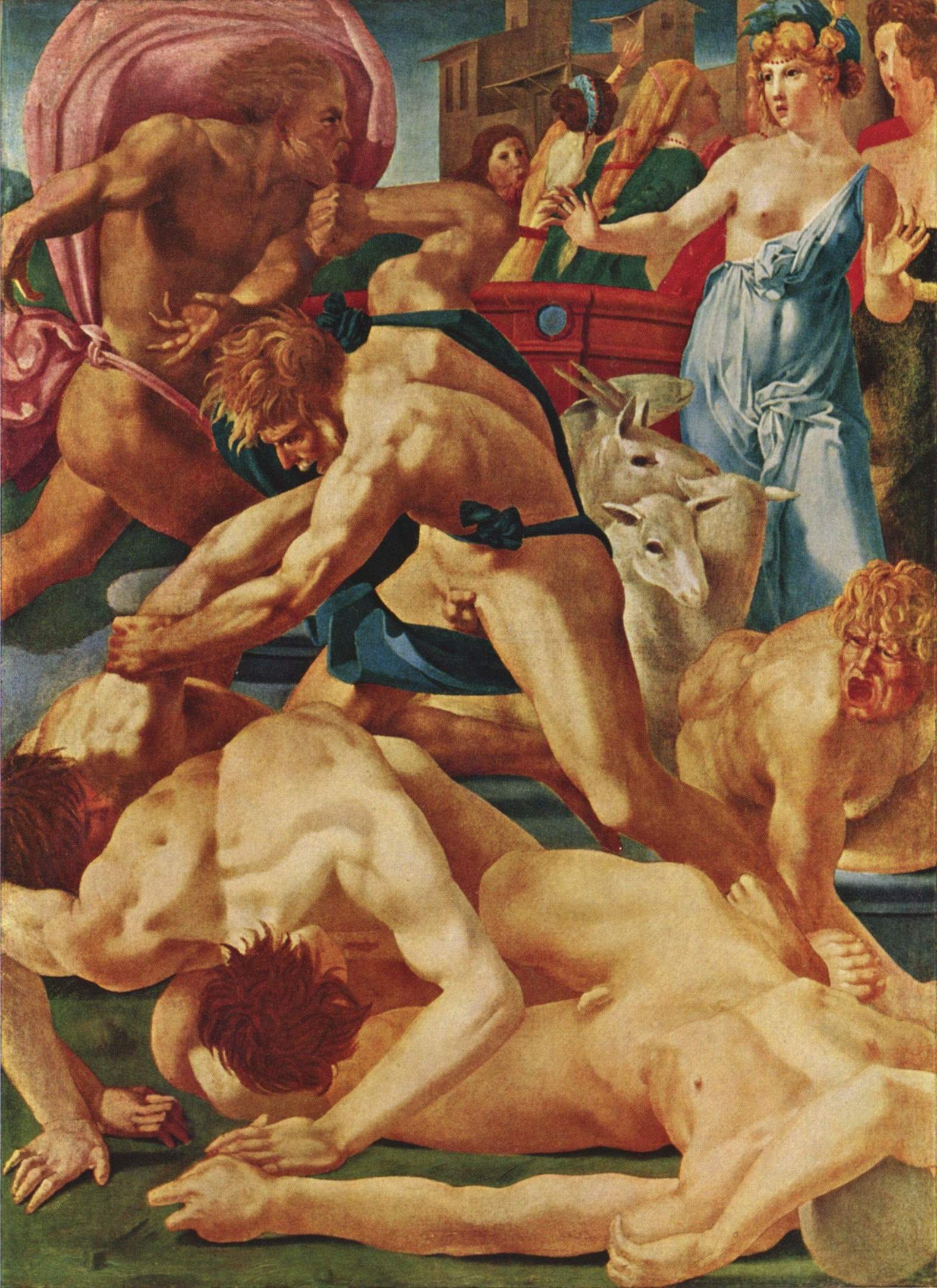
Moses Defending the Daughters of Jethro by Rosso Fiorentino (c.1523) at the Uffizi Gallery, Florence.

Giovanni Battista di Jacopo (8 March 1495 (Note: According to the calendar system in use in Florence at the time, the year began on 25 March, meaning that his birth year was marked as 1494.) – 14 November 1540), known as Rosso Fiorentino (meaning "Florentine Redhead" in Italian) or Il Rosso ("The Redhead"), was an Italian Mannerist painter who worked in oil and fresco and belonged to the Florentine school.

== Biography ==
Born in Florence with the red hair that gave him his nickname, Rosso first trained in the studio of Andrea del Sarto alongside his contemporary, Pontormo. His early works include Holy Family with the Infant Saint John the Baptist (Walters Art Gallery), Cherub Playing a Lute (Uffizi) and The Infant Saint John the Baptist (private collection), all produced around 1521. In late 1523, Rosso moved to Rome, where he was exposed to the works of Michelangelo, Raphael, and other Renaissance artists, resulting in the realignment of his artistic style.

Fleeing Rome after the Sacking of 1527, Rosso eventually went to France where he secured a position at the court of Francis I in 1530, remaining there until his death. Together with Francesco Primaticcio, Rosso was one of the leading artists to work at the Chateau Fontainebleau as part of the "First School of Fontainebleau", spending much of his life there. Following his death in 1540 (which, according to an unsubstantiated claim by Vasari, was a suicide ), Francesco Primaticcio took charge of the artistic direction at Fontainebleau.

Rosso's reputation, along those of other stylized late Renaissance Florentines, was long out of favour in comparison to other more naturalistic and graceful contemporaries, but has revived considerably in recent decades. That his masterpiece is in a small city, away from the tourist track, was a factor in this, especially before the arrival of photography. His poses are certainly contorted, and his figures often appear haggard and thin, but his work has considerable power.

== Deposition from the Cross ==
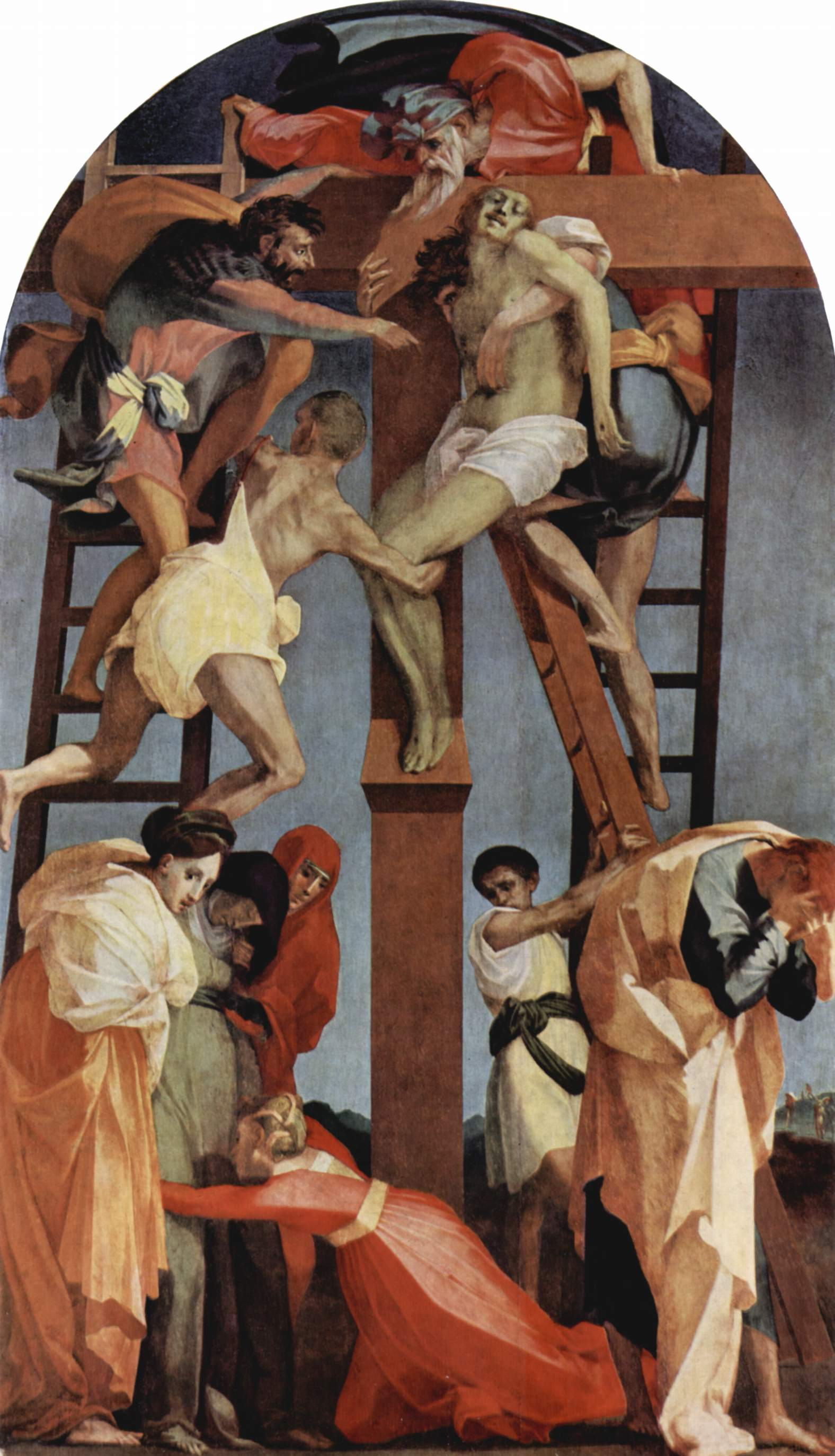
Rosso Fiorentino. Descent from the Cross. 1521. Oil on wood. 375 × 196 cm. Pinacoteca Comunale di Volterra, Italy.

His masterpiece is generally considered to be the Deposition or Descent from the Cross altarpiece in the Pinacoteca Comunale di Volterra (initially painted for the Duomo). In contrast to the frozen grief of other depositions, this one appears as a hurried and complicated operation, while the figures below have simple and forceful expressions of quiet grief, with powerful expressions hinted at by hidden faces. The sky is somber. The three ladders and those carrying down Christ appear precarious. Christ himself is sallow. Contrast this frenetic, windswept scene with the equally complex, but more restrained composition on the same theme by the near contemporary Florentine Mannerist Pontormo.

Rosso would go on to paint a second, darker and more crowded Deposition altarpiece for the church of San Lorenzo in Sansepolcro.

== Gallery ==
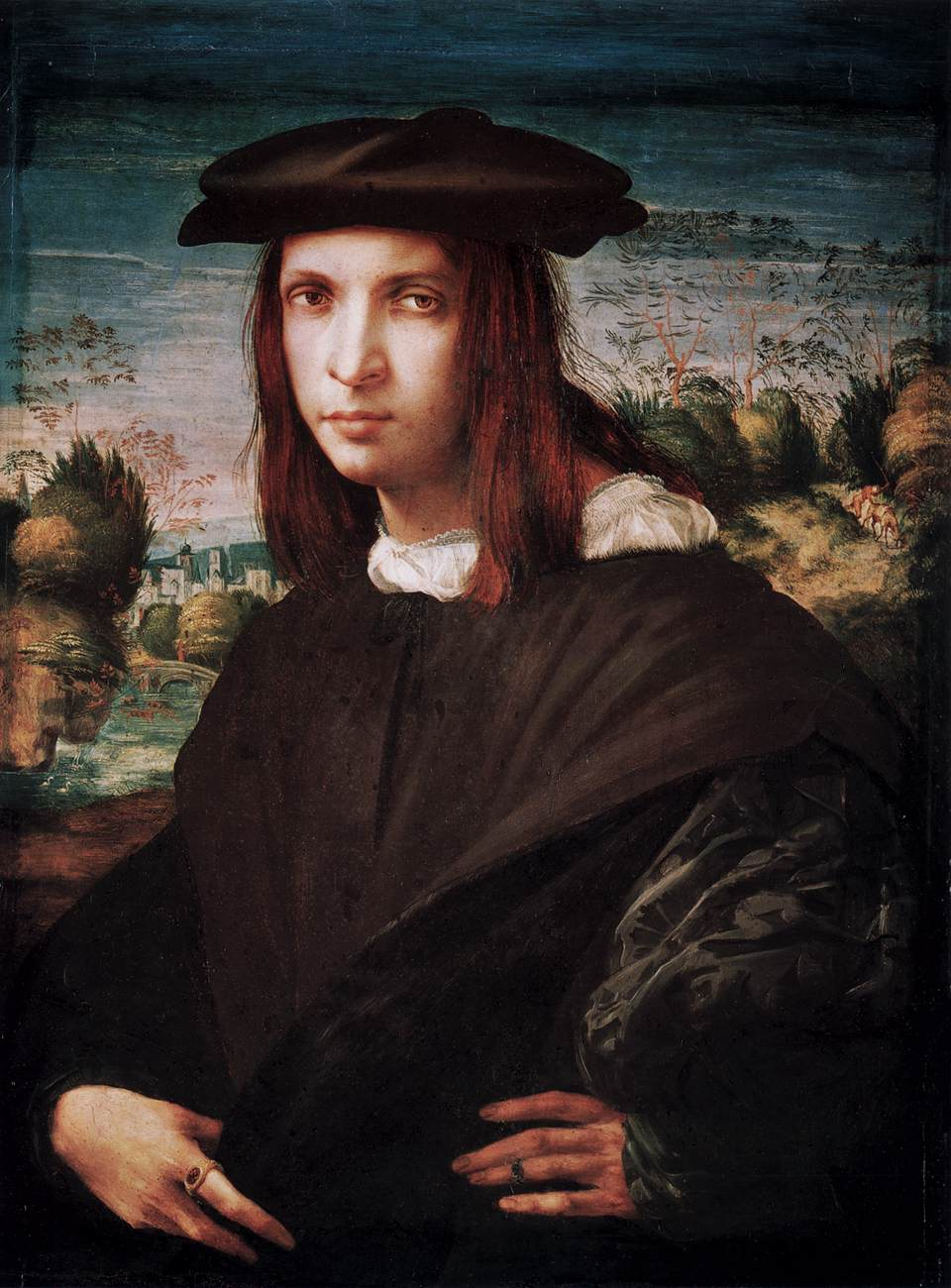
Portrait of a Young Man (1516–18)

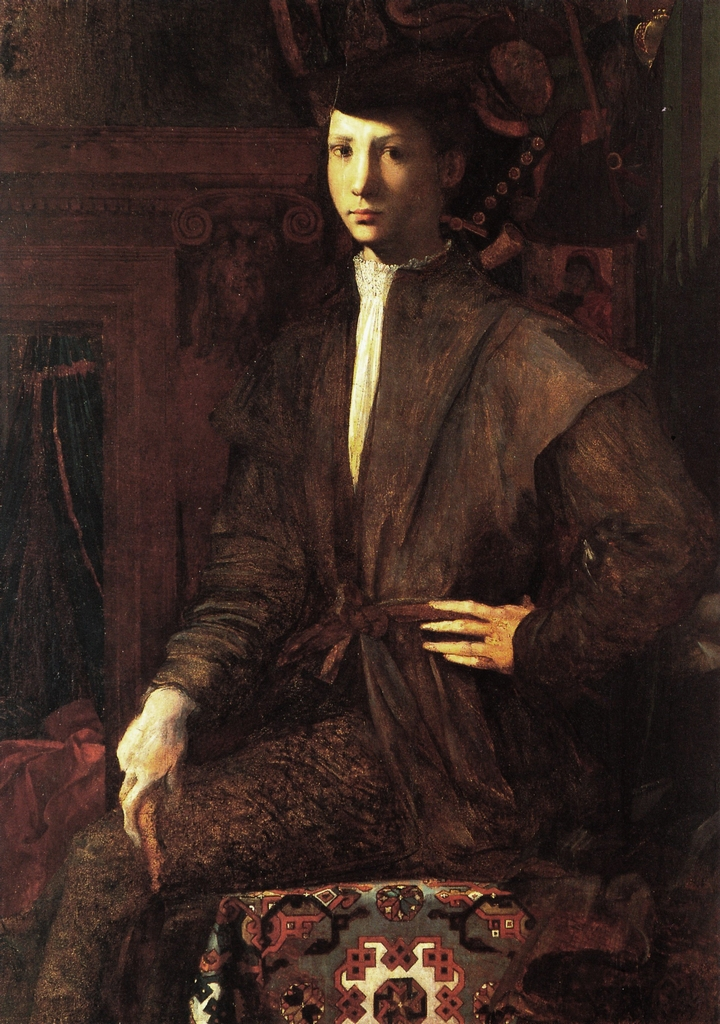
Portrait of a Young Man Seated on a Carpet (c. 1525–1527)

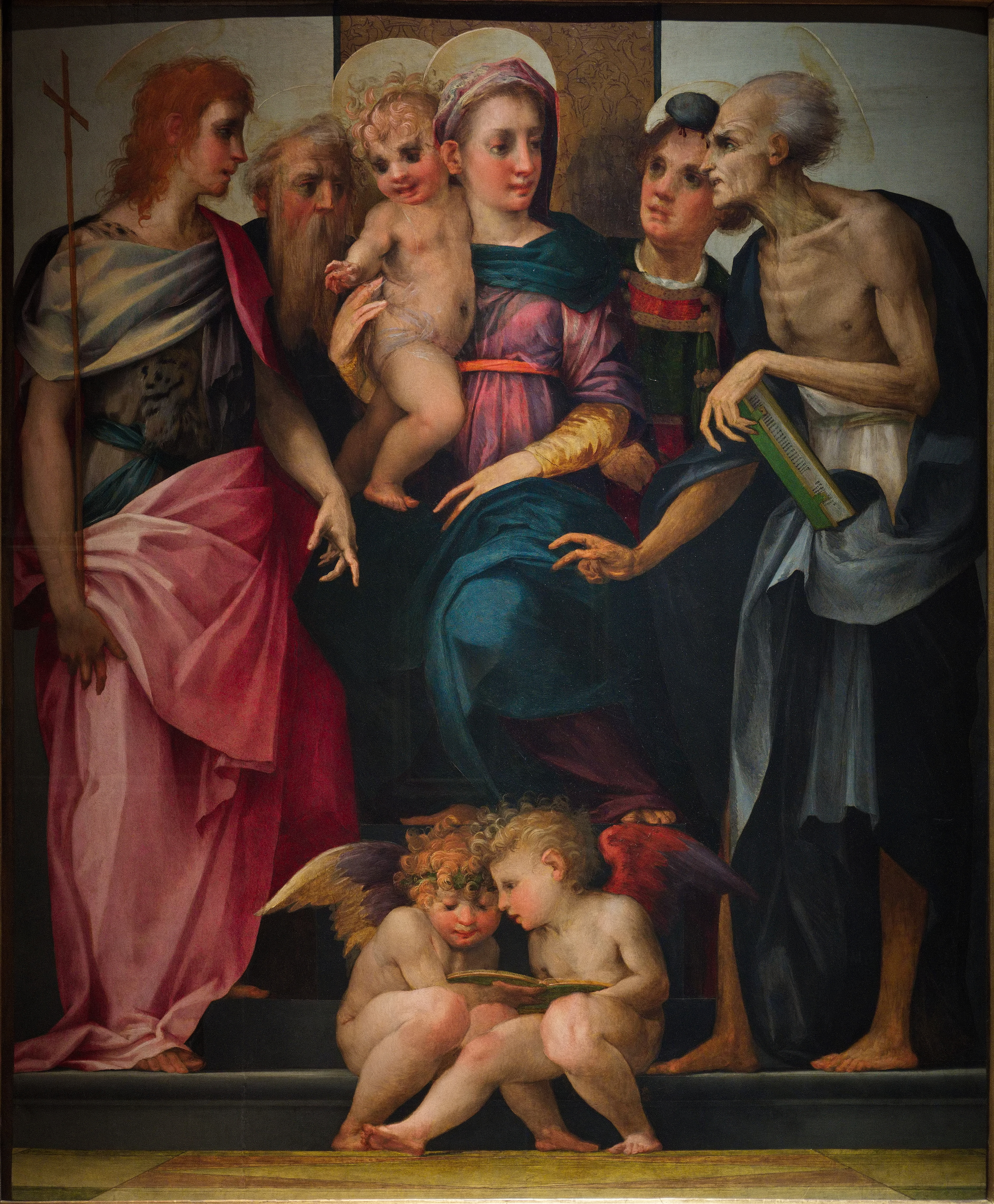
Sacred Conversation with Musical Angels (1518), Uffizi, Florence

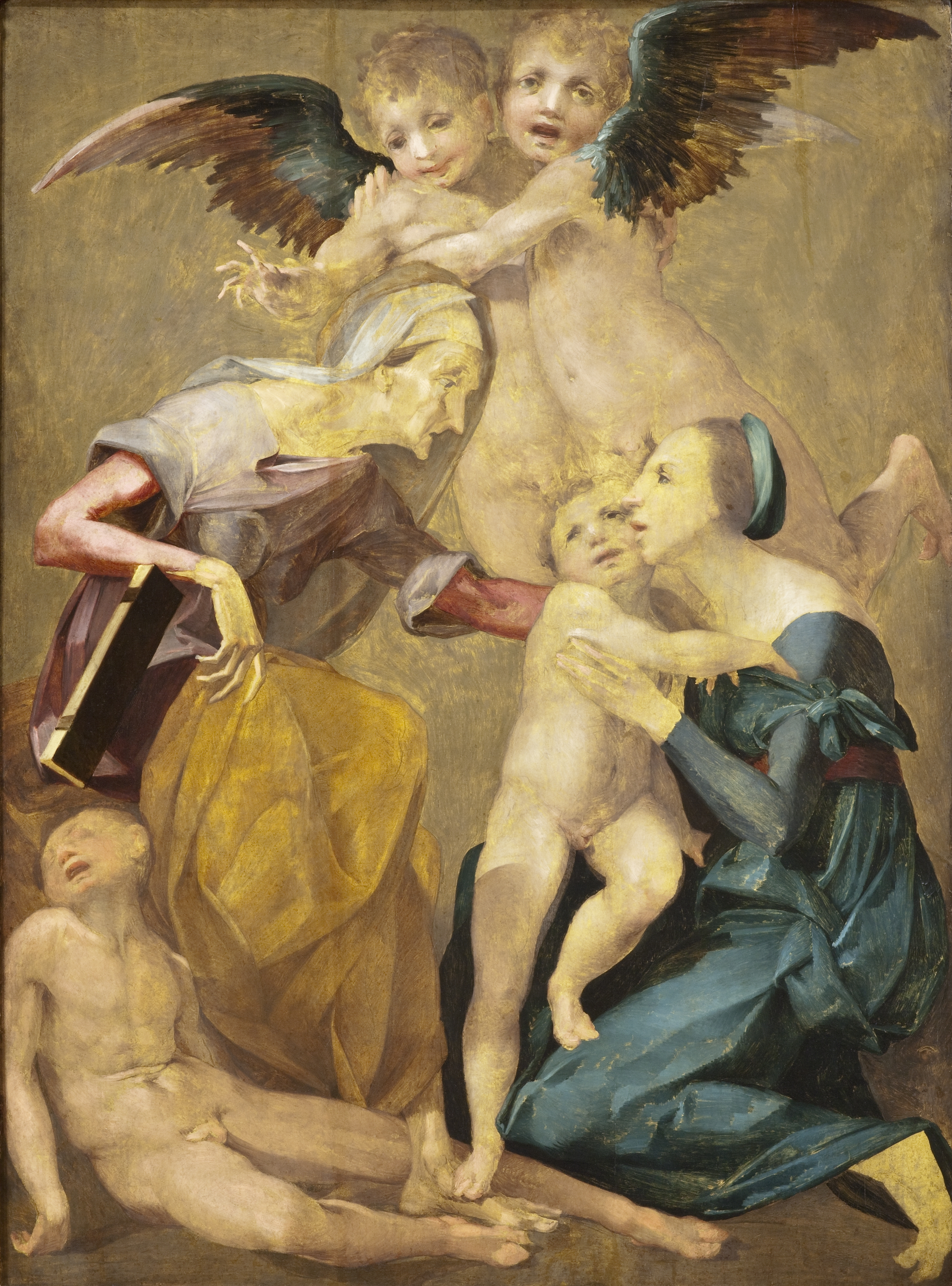
Allegory of Salvation with the Virgin and Christ Child, St. Elizabeth, the Young St. John the Baptist and Two Angels (c. 1520)

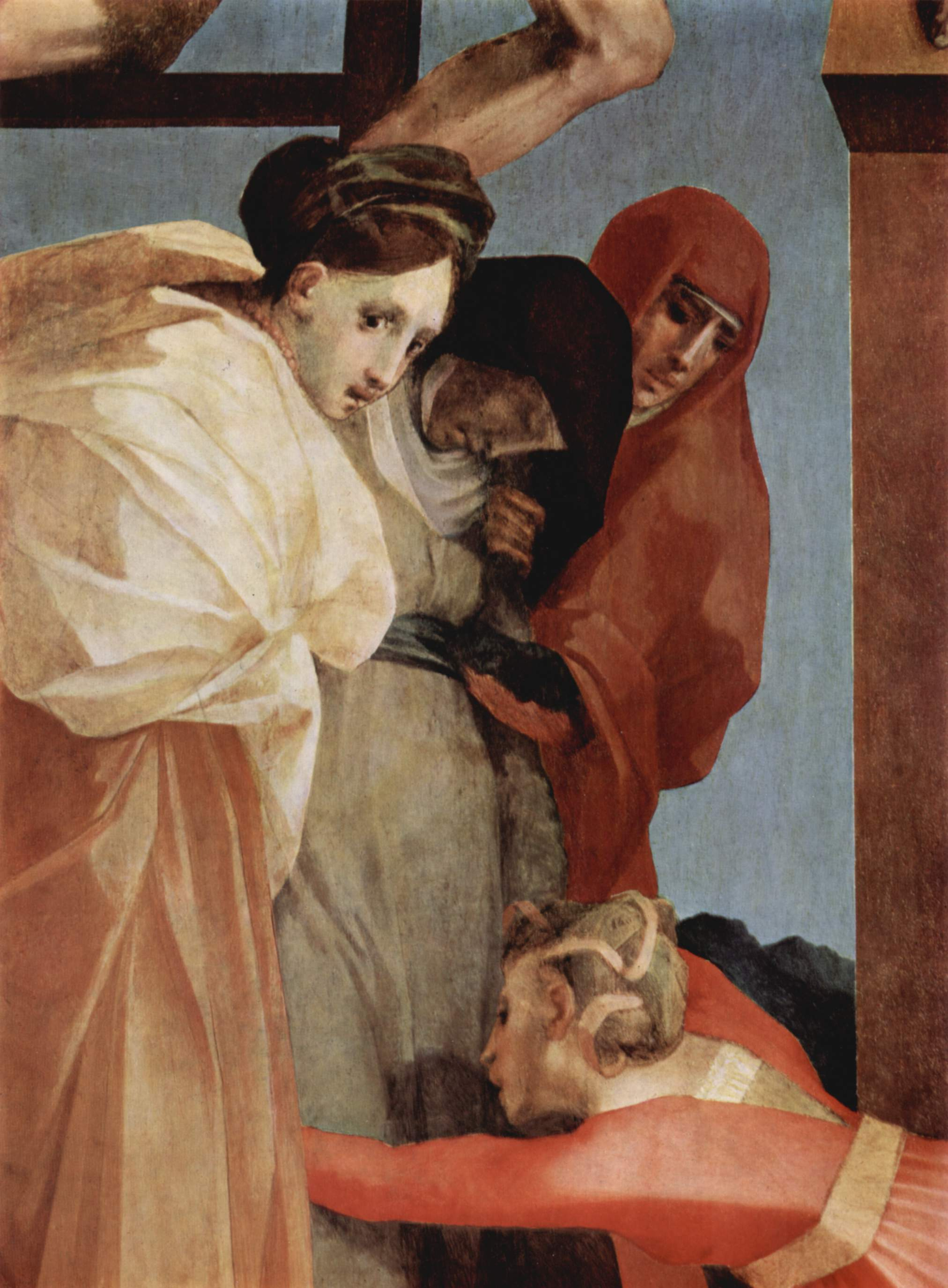
Descent from the Cross, detail

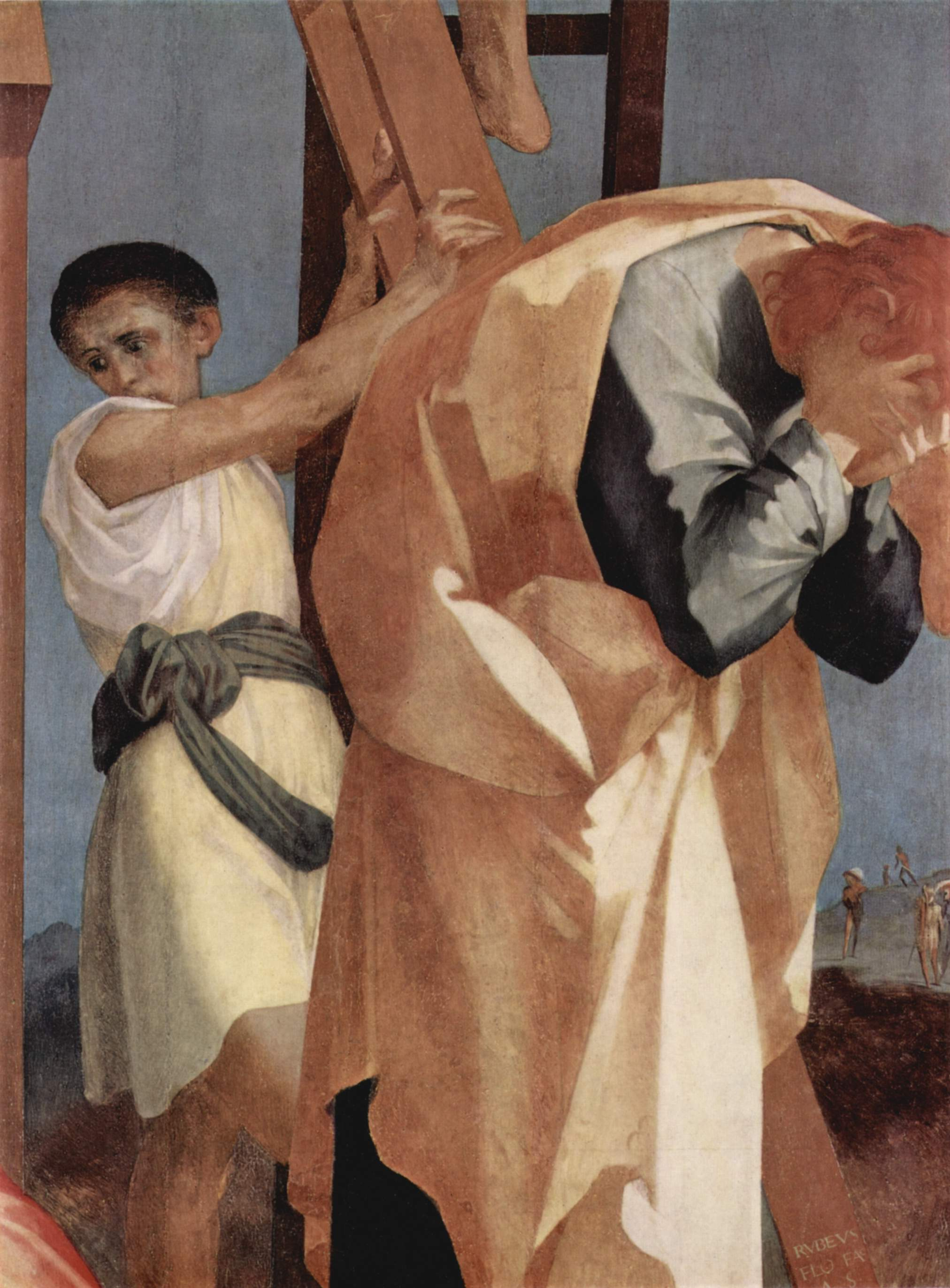
Descent from the Cross, detail

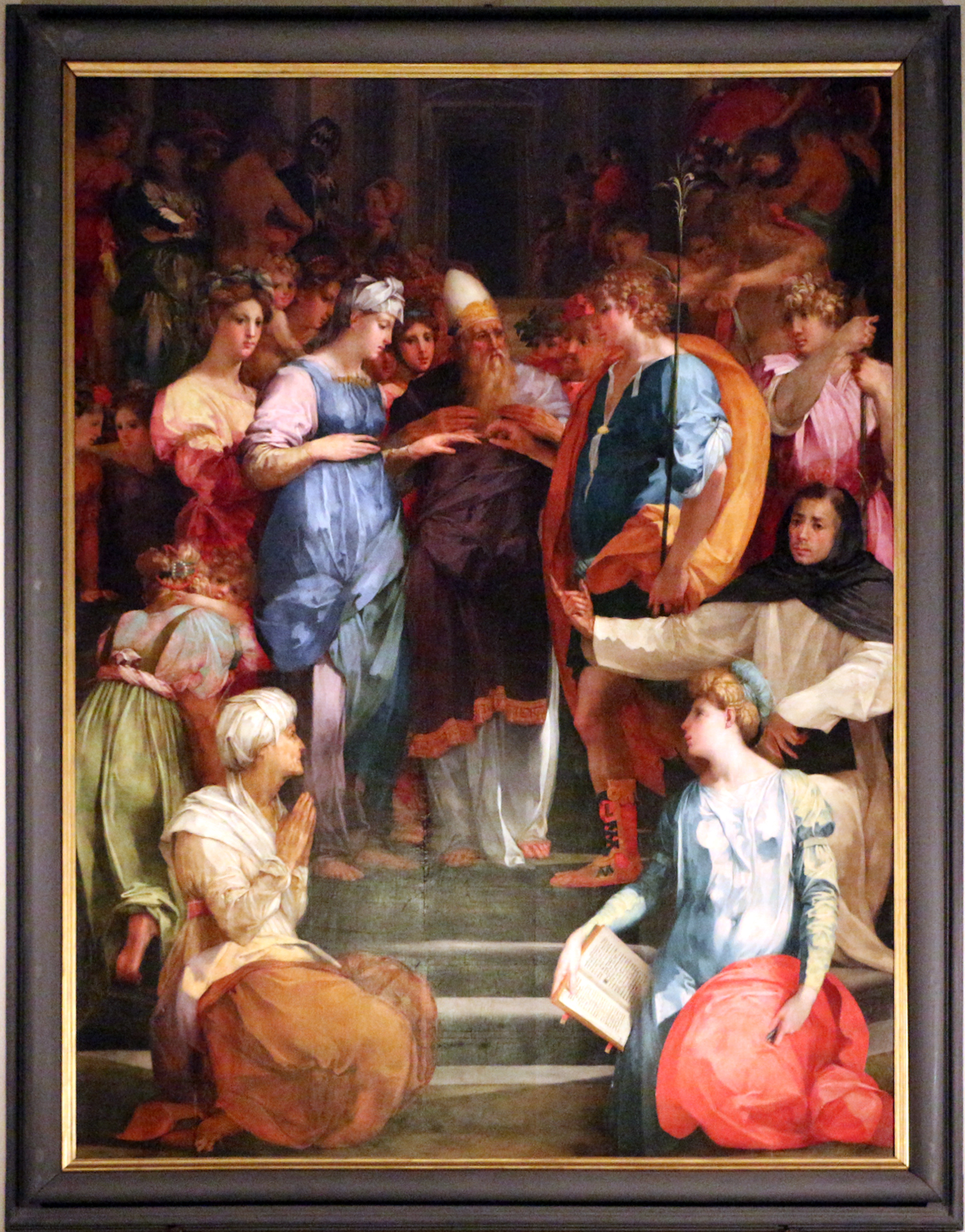
Marriage of the Virgin and Saints (1523)

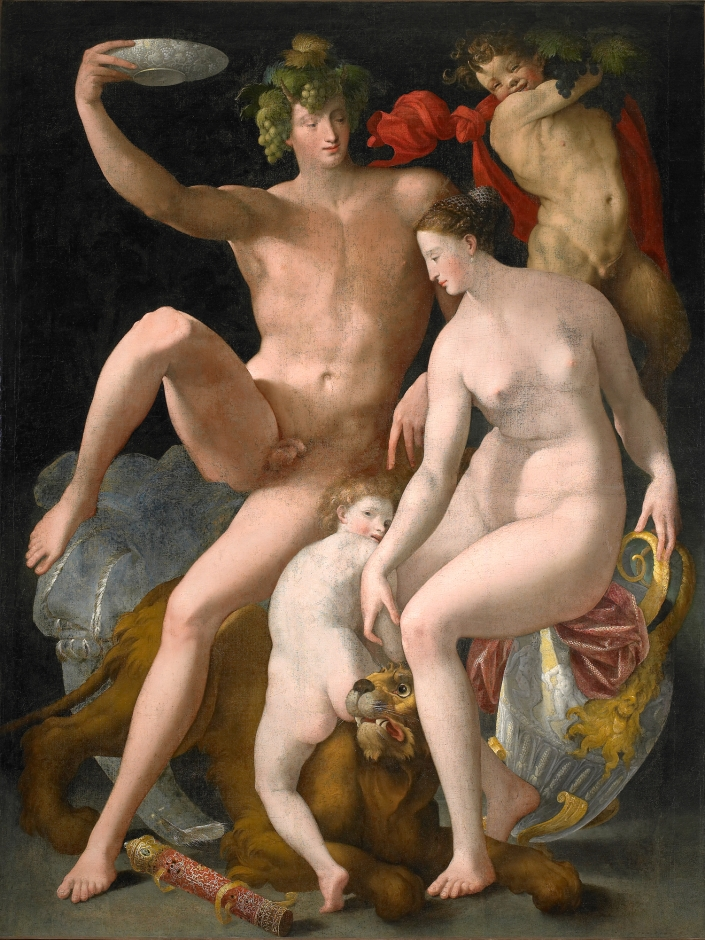
Bacchus, Venus and Cupid (c. 1531)

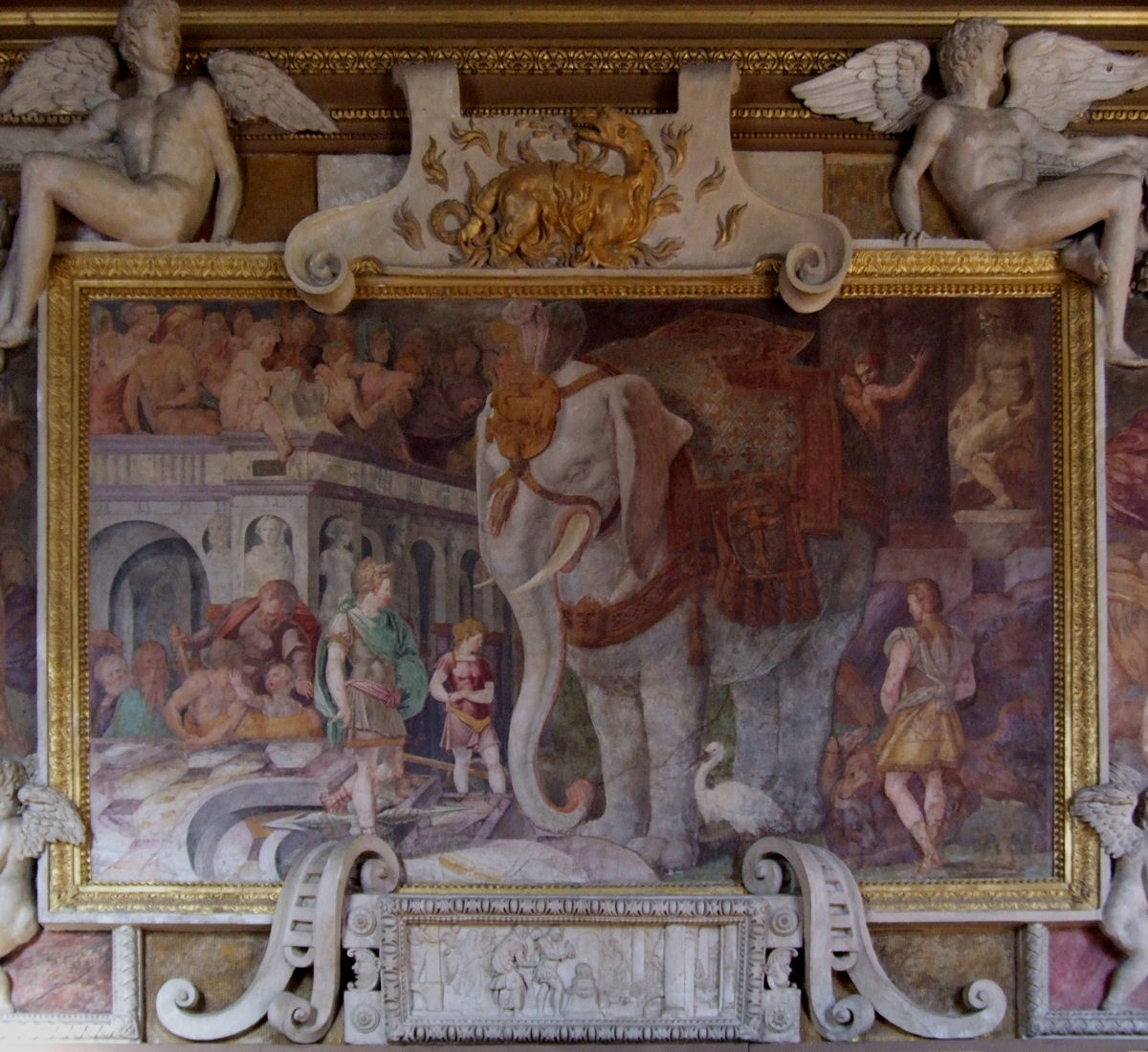
Elephant, Château de Fontainebleau (c. 1536)

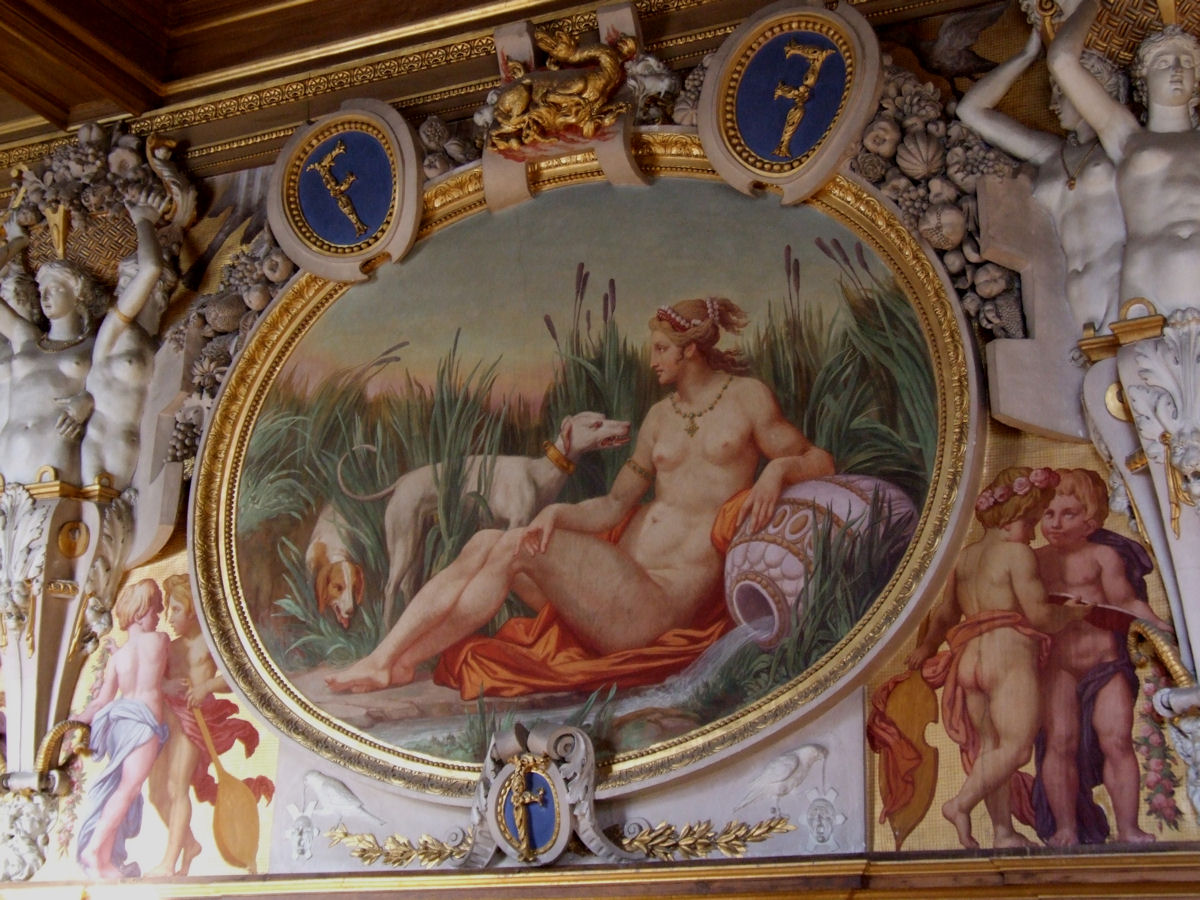
Diana, Château de Fontainebleau
