= List of members of the House of Commons at Westminster 1705–1708 =

1705–1708 Parliament of Great Britain
1708–1710 Parliament	→

Overview
- Legislative body: Parliament of Great Britain
- Meeting place: Palace of Westminster
- Term: 14 June 1705 – 15 April 1708
- Election: 1705 English general election; 1702 Scottish general election
- Government: Godolphin–Marlborough ministry

House of Commons
- Members: 558
- Speaker: John Smith
- Chief ministers: Sidney Godolphin, 1st Earl of Godolphin; John Churchill, 1st Duke of Marlborough

House of Lords
- Lord Chancellor: William Cowper, 1st Earl Cowper

Crown-in-Parliament Anne

Sessions
- 1st: 25 October 1705 – 19 March 1706
- 2nd: 3 December 1706 – 8 April 1707
- 3rd: 14 April 1707 – 24 April 1707
- 4th: 23 October 1707 – 1 April 1708

This is a list of members of the House of Commons who met at the Palace of Westminster between 14 June 1705 and 15 April 1708, initially as the House of Commons of England, then after the Acts of Union 1707 as the House of Commons of Great Britain.

== Background ==
At the start of the eighteenth century the House of Commons of the Parliament of England had 513 members: 489 representing 245 constituencies in England and 24 representing 24 constituencies in Wales. In England there were 40 counties, returning two members each; 196 boroughs returning two members each, two boroughs (London and Weymouth and Melcombe Regis) returning four members each; five boroughs (Abingdon, Banbury, Bewdley, Higham Ferrers and Monmouth) returning one member each; and the two universities of Oxford and Cambridge returning two members each. In Wales there were twelve counties returning one member each, and twelve boroughs returning one member each.

The Commons of the second English Parliament of Queen Anne had been elected in May and June 1705. By proclamation of 29 April 1707 this parliament was declared to be the first Parliament of Great Britain. In February 1707 the shire commissioners and burgh commissioners of the last Parliament of Scotland in Edinburgh had elected 45 of their number (30 for the shires and 15 for the burghs) to represent Scotland in the House of Commons of Great Britain, and these new members took their seats at Westminster in November 1707. This brought the total number of Members of Parliament to 558, representing 314 constituencies. The Parliament was dissolved on 15 April 1708, triggering the first general election to the Parliament of Great Britain.

== List of Members of Parliament ==
Name	Date of election	Constituency	County	Notes	Ref
Sir Pynsent Chernock	23 May 1705	Bedfordshire	Bedford		
Sir William Gostwick	23 May 1705	Bedfordshire	Bedford		
William Farrer	11 May 1705	Bedford	Bedford		
Sir Philip Monoux	11 May 1705	Bedford	Bedford	Died on 25 November 1707.	
William Hillersden	15 December 1707 (vice Monoux)	Bedford	Bedford		
Richard Neville	9 May 1705	Berkshire	Berks		
Sir John Stonhouse	9 May 1705	Berkshire	Berks		
Grey Neville	10 May 1705	Abingdon	Berks		
Sir Owen Buckingham	8 May 1705	Reading	Berks		
Tanfield Vachell	8 May 1705	Reading	Berks	Died on 19 October 1705.	
Sir William Rich	26 November 1705 (vice Vachell)	Reading	Berks		
William Jennens	7 May 1705	Wallingford	Berks		
Clement Kent	7 May 1705	Wallingford	Berks		
The Viscount Fitzhardinge	8 May 1705	New Windsor	Berks		
Richard Topham	8 May 1705	New Windsor	Berks		
Robert Dormer	24 May 1705	Buckinghamshire	Buckingham	Appointed a puisne justice of the Court of Common Pleas in February 1706.	
Sir Richard Temple	24 May 1705	Buckinghamshire	Buckingham		
William Egerton	27 February 1706 (vice Dormer)	Buckinghamshire	Buckingham		
The Viscount of Newhaven	8 May 1705	Amersham	Buckingham	As a peer of Scotland, disqualified under the Act of Union on 1 May 1707.	
Sir Samuel Garrard	8 May 1705	Amersham	Buckingham		
John Drake	21 November 1707 (vice Newhaven)	Amersham	Buckingham		
Sir John Wittewronge	2 May 1705	Aylesbury	Buckingham		
Simon Mayne	2 May 1705	Aylesbury	Buckingham		
Sir Richard Temple	8 May 1705	Buckingham	Buckingham	Chose to sit for Buckinghamshire.	
Sir Edmund Denton	8 May 1705	Buckingham	Buckingham		
Browne Willis	3 December 1705 (vice Temple)	Buckingham	Buckingham		
Charles Godfrey	9 May 1705	Chipping Wycombe	Buckingham		
Fleetwood Dormer	9 May 1705	Chipping Wycombe	Buckingham	As a Commissioner for Prizes, disqualified under the Regency Act in November 1707.	
Fleetwood Dormer	29 November 1707 (re-elected)	Chipping Wycombe	Buckingham		
Sir James Etheridge	8 May 1705	Great Marlow	Buckingham		
James Chase	8 May 1705	Great Marlow	Buckingham		
Richard Hampden	8 May 1705	Wendover	Buckingham		
Sir Roger Hill	8 May 1705	Wendover	Buckingham		
Sir Rushout Cullen	24 May 1705	Cambridgeshire	Cambridge		
John Bromley	24 May 1705	Cambridgeshire	Cambridge	Died on 7 October 1707.	
John Bromley	4 December 1707 (vice Bromley)	Cambridgeshire	Cambridge		
Arthur Annesley	17 May 1705	Cambridge University	Cambridge		
Dixie Windsor	17 May 1705	Cambridge University	Cambridge		
Sir John Cotton	17 May 1705	Cambridge	Cambridge		
Anthony Thompson	17 May 1705	Cambridge	Cambridge		
John Crewe Offley	23 May 1705	Cheshire	Chester		
Langham Booth	23 May 1705	Cheshire	Chester		
Sir Henry Bunbury	23 May 1705	Chester	Chester		
Peter Shakerley	23 May 1705	Chester	Chester		
Hugh Boscawen	23 May 1705	Cornwall	Cornwall		
Sir Richard Vyvyan	23 May 1705	Cornwall	Cornwall		
John Hoblyn	19 May 1705	Bodmin	Cornwall	Died before 4 June 1706.	
Francis Robartes	19 May 1705	Bodmin	Cornwall		
Thomas Herne	17 December 1706 (vice Hoblyn)	Bodmin	Cornwall		
Sir Simon Harcourt	19 May 1705	Bossiney	Cornwall		
John Manley	19 May 1705	Bossiney	Cornwall		
Sir William Coryton	22 May 1705	Callington	Cornwall		
Samuel Rolle	22 May 1705	Callington	Cornwall		
William Pole (succeeded as baronet 13 March 1708)	21 May 1705	Camelford	Cornwall		
Henry Pinnell	21 May 1705	Camelford	Cornwall		
George Granville	21 May 1705	Fowey	Cornwall		
John Hicks	21 May 1705	Fowey	Cornwall		
Francis Scobell	18 May 1705	Grampound	Cornwall		
James Craggs	18 May 1705	Grampound	Cornwall		
Sidney Godolphin	21 May 1705	Helston	Cornwall		
Francis Godolphin (styled Viscount Rialton from 1706)	21 May 1705	Helston	Cornwall		
Lord Hyde	22 May 1705	Launceston	Cornwall		
William Cary	22 May 1705	Launceston	Cornwall		
William Bridges	22 May 1705	Liskeard	Cornwall		
Thomas Dodson	22 May 1705	Liskeard	Cornwall	Died before 24 August 1707.	
John Dolben	21 November 1707 (vice Dodson)	Liskeard	Cornwall		
Sir Henry Seymour	22 May 1705	East Looe	Cornwall		
George Clarke	22 May 1705	East Looe	Cornwall		
Sir Charles Hedges	22 May 1705	West Looe	Cornwall		
John Mountstephen	22 May 1705	West Looe	Cornwall	Died on 19 December 1706.	
Francis Palmes	23 January 1707 (vice Mounstephen)	West Looe	Cornwall		
Russell Robartes	21 May 1705	Lostwithiel	Cornwall		
Robert Molesworth	21 May 1705	Lostwithiel	Cornwall	The election of Molesworth was overturned on petition, and Kendall declared elected.	
James Kendall	17 January 1706 (vice Molesworth) (Note: Date previous election overturned on petition.)	Lostwithiel	Cornwall	The election of Molesworth was overturned on petition, and Kendall declared elected.	
Sir William Hodges	19 May 1705	Mitchell	Cornwall		
Hugh Fortescue	19 May 1705	Mitchell	Cornwall		
Sir Nicholas Morice	22 May 1705	Newport	Cornwall		
John Spark	22 May 1705	Newport	Cornwall	Died on 2 January 1707.	
Sir John Pole	21 January 1707 (vice Spark)	Newport	Cornwall		
Samuel Trefusis	19 May 1705	Penryn	Cornwall		
James Vernon	19 May 1705	Penryn	Cornwall		
Samuel Rolle	22 May 1705	St Germans	Cornwall	Chose to sit for Callington.	
Henry Fleming	22 May 1705	St Germans	Cornwall		
Edward Eliot	4 December 1705 (vice Rolle)	St Germans	Cornwall		
Sir Bartholomew Gracedieu	21 May 1705	St Ives	Cornwall		
John Borlase	21 May 1705	St Ives	Cornwall		
Sir Joseph Tredenham	19 May 1705	St Mawes	Cornwall	Died on 24 or 25 April 1707.	
Francis Godfrey	19 May 1705	St Mawes	Cornwall		
John Tredenham	21 November 1707 (vice Tredenham)	St Mawes	Cornwall		
James Buller	21 May 1705	Saltash	Cornwall		
Joseph Moyle	21 May 1705	Saltash	Cornwall		
John Trevanion	18 May 1705	Tregony	Cornwall		
Sir Philip Meadowes	18 May 1705	Tregony	Cornwall		
Hugh Boscawen	18 May 1705	Truro	Cornwall	Chose to sit for Cornwall.	
Henry Vincent	18 May 1705	Truro	Cornwall		
Peregrine Bertie	30 November 1705 (vice Boscawen)	Truro	Cornwall		
George Fletcher	30 May 1705	Cumberland	Cumberland		
Richard Musgrave	30 May 1705	Cumberland	Cumberland		
Thomas Stanwix	18 May 1705	Carlisle	Cumberland		
Sir James Montagu	18 May 1705	Carlisle	Cumberland		
James Stanhope	21 May 1705	Cockermouth	Cumberland		
Thomas Lamplugh	21 May 1705	Cockermouth	Cumberland		
John Curzon	24 May 1705	Derbyshire	Derby		
Thomas Coke	24 May 1705	Derbyshire	Derby		
Lord James Cavendish	12 May 1705	Derby	Derby		
Thomas Parker (knighted 9 July 1705)	12 May 1705	Derby	Derby		
Sir William Courtenay	5 June 1705	Devon	Devon		
Robert Rolle	5 June 1705	Devon	Devon		
Richard Reynell	17 May 1705	Ashburton	Devon		
Gilbert Yarde	17 May 1705	Ashburton	Devon	Died in December 1707.	
Roger Tuckfield	21 January 1708 (vice Yarde)	Ashburton	Devon		
Nicholas Hooper	17 May 1705	Barnstaple	Devon		
Samuel Rolle	17 May 1705	Barnstaple	Devon		
William Cowper	17 May 1705	Bere Alston	Devon	Appointed Lord Keeper of the Great Seal on 11 October 1705.	
Peter King	17 May 1705	Bere Alston	Devon		
Spencer Cowper	1 December 1705 (vice Cowper)	Bere Alston	Devon		
Nathaniel Herne	16 May 1705	Dartmouth	Devon		
Frederick Herne	16 May 1705	Dartmouth	Devon		
Sir Edward Seymour	30 May 1705	Exeter	Devon	Died on 18 February 1708.	
John Snell	30 May 1705	Exeter	Devon		
John Harris	13 April 1708 (vice Seymour)	Exeter	Devon		
Sir William Drake	18 May 1705	Honiton	Devon		
Sir Walter Yonge	18 May 1705	Honiton	Devon		
Thomas Northmore	15 May 1705	Okehampton	Devon		
John Dibble	15 May 1705	Okehampton	Devon	Double return: Dibble was declared elected on 20 December 1705.	
Sir Simon Leach	15 May 1705	Okehampton	Devon	Double return: Dibble was declared elected on 20 December 1705.	
Charles Trelawny	19 May 1705	Plymouth	Devon		
Sir George Byng	19 May 1705	Plymouth	Devon		
Sir John Cope	21 May 1705	Plympton	Devon		
Richard Edgcumbe	21 May 1705	Plympton	Devon		
Henry Manaton	18 May 1705	Tavistock	Devon		
James Bulteel	18 May 1705	Tavistock	Devon		
Thomas Bere	19 May 1705	Tiverton	Devon		
Robert Burridge	19 May 1705	Tiverton	Devon		
Sir Humphrey Mackworth	17 May 1705	Totnes	Devon		
Thomas Coulson	17 May 1705	Totnes	Devon		
Thomas Strangways	30 May 1705	Dorset	Dorset		
Thomas Chafin	30 May 1705	Dorset	Dorset		
Alexander Pitfield	14 May 1705	Bridport	Dorset		
Thomas Strangways	14 May 1705	Bridport	Dorset		
John Bankes	11 May 1705	Corfe Castle	Dorset		
Richard Fownes	11 May 1705	Corfe Castle	Dorset		
Awnsham Churchill	14 May 1705	Dorchester	Dorset		
Nathaniel Napier	14 May 1705	Dorchester	Dorset		
Thomas Freke	15 May 1705	Lyme Regis	Dorset		
John Burridge	15 May 1705	Lyme Regis	Dorset		
Sir William Phippard	22 May 1705	Poole	Dorset		
Samuel Weston	22 May 1705	Poole	Dorset		
Edward Nicholas	15 May 1705	Shaftesbury	Dorset		
Sir John Cropley	15 May 1705	Shaftesbury	Dorset		
Thomas Erle	15 May 1705	Wareham	Dorset		
George Pitt	15 May 1705	Wareham	Dorset		
Charles Churchill	12 May 1705	Weymouth and Melcombe Regis	Dorset		
Anthony Henley	12 May 1705	Weymouth and Melcombe Regis	Dorset		
Maurice Ashley	12 May 1705	Weymouth and Melcombe Regis	Dorset		
Henry Thynne	12 May 1705	Weymouth and Melcombe Regis	Dorset		
Sir Robert Eden	16 May 1705	County Durham	Durham		
Sir William Bowes	16 May 1705	County Durham	Durham	Died on 16 January 1707.	
John Tempest	15 March 1707 (vice Bowes)	County Durham	Durham		
Thomas Conyers	14 May 1705	Durham	Durham		
Sir Henry Belasyse	14 May 1705	Durham	Durham		
Lord Walden	15 May 1705	Essex	Essex	Created Earl of Bindon on 30 December 1706.	
Sir Francis Masham	15 May 1705	Essex	Essex		
Thomas Middleton	21 January 1707 (vice Walden)	Essex	Essex		
Sir Isaac Rebow	8 May 1705	Colchester	Essex		
Edward Bullock	8 May 1705	Colchester	Essex	Died on 6 December 1705.	
Sir Thomas Webster	18 December 1705 (vice Bullock)	Colchester	Essex		
Sir Thomas Davall	10 May 1705	Harwich	Essex		
John Ellis	10 May 1705	Harwich	Essex		
William Fytche	7 May 1705	Maldon	Essex		
John Comyns	7 May 1705	Maldon	Essex		
Sir John Guise	16 May 1705	Gloucestershire	Gloucester		
Maynard Colchester	16 May 1705	Gloucestershire	Gloucester		
Sir William Daines	6 June 1705	Bristol	Gloucester		
Robert Yate	6 June 1705	Bristol	Gloucester		
Allen Bathurst	10 May 1705	Cirencester	Gloucester		
Henry Ireton	10 May 1705	Cirencester	Gloucester	Double return: Ireton was declared elected on 15 November 1705.	
Charles Coxe	10 May 1705	Cirencester	Gloucester	Double return: Ireton was declared elected on 15 November 1705.	
John Hanbury	25 May 1705	Gloucester	Gloucester		
William Cooke	25 May 1705	Gloucester	Gloucester		
Richard Dowdeswell	11 May 1705	Tewkesbury	Gloucester		
Edmund Bray	11 May 1705	Tewkesbury	Gloucester		
The Viscount Scudamore	16 May 1705	Herefordshire	Hereford		
Henry Gorges	16 May 1705	Herefordshire	Hereford		
James Brydges	12 May 1705	Hereford	Hereford		
Thomas Foley	12 May 1705	Hereford	Hereford		
The Lord Coningsby	14 May 1705	Leominster	Hereford		
Edward Harley	14 May 1705	Leominster	Hereford		
Henry Cornewall	14 May 1705	Weobley	Hereford		
John Birch	14 May 1705	Weobley	Hereford		
Sir John Spencer	10 May 1705	Hertfordshire	Hertford		
Ralph Freman	10 May 1705	Hertfordshire	Hertford		
Charles Caesar	7 May 1705	Hertford	Hertford		
Richard Goulston	7 May 1705	Hertford	Hertford	The election of Goulston was overturned on petition, and Clarke declared elected.	
Thomas Clarke (knighted 24 July 1706)	6 December 1705 (vice Goulston)	Hertford	Hertford	The election of Goulston was overturned on petition, and Clarke declared elected.	
George Churchill	9 May 1705	St Albans	Hertford		
John Gape	9 May 1705	St Albans	Hertford	The election of Gape was overturned on petition, and Killigrew declared elected.	
Henry Killigrew	24 November 1705 (vice Gape)	St Albans	Hertford	The election of Gape was overturned on petition, and Killigrew declared elected.	
John Dryden	26 May 1705	Huntingdonshire	Huntingdon	Died on 3 January 1708.	
John Pocklington	26 May 1705	Huntingdonshire	Huntingdon		
John Proby	31 January 1708 (vice Dryden)	Huntingdonshire	Huntingdon		
Sir John Cotton	15 May 1705	Huntingdon	Huntingdon	The election of Cotton was overturned on petition, and Pedley declared elected.	
Edward Wortley Montagu	15 May 1705	Huntingdon	Huntingdon		
John Pedley	22 January 1706 (vice Cotton)	Huntingdon	Huntingdon	The election of Cotton was overturned on petition, and Pedley declared elected.	
Viscount Villiers	22 May 1705	Kent	Kent		
Sir Cholmeley Dering	22 May 1705	Kent	Kent		
Henry Lee	31 May 1705	Canterbury	Kent		
John Hardres	31 May 1705	Canterbury	Kent		
Sir Thomas Colepeper	9 May 1705	Maidstone	Kent		
Thomas Bliss	9 May 1705	Maidstone	Kent		
Sir John Jennings	9 May 1705	Queenborough	Kent		
Thomas King	9 May 1705	Queenborough	Kent		
Sir Clowdesley Shovell	8 May 1705	Rochester	Kent	Died on 22 October 1707.	
Sir Stafford Fairborne	8 May 1705	Rochester	Kent		
Sir John Leake	3 January 1708 (vice Shovell)	Rochester	Kent		
Charles Zedenno Stanley	15 May 1705	Lancashire	Lancaster		
Richard Shuttleworth	15 May 1705	Lancashire	Lancaster		
Edward Harvey	15 May 1705	Clitheroe	Lancaster		
Thomas Stringer	15 May 1705	Clitheroe	Lancaster	Died on 17 September 1706.	
Daniel Harvey	27 December 1706 (vice Stringer)	Clitheroe	Lancaster	Double return: Harvey was declared elected on 22 January 1707.	
Christopher Parker	27 December 1706 (vice Stringer)	Clitheroe	Lancaster	Double return: Harvey was declared elected on 22 January 1707.	
Robert Heysham	15 May 1705	Lancaster	Lancaster		
William Heysham	15 May 1705	Lancaster	Lancaster		
William Clayton	14 May 1705	Liverpool	Lancaster		
Thomas Johnson (knighted 20 March 1708)	14 May 1705	Liverpool	Lancaster		
Thomas Legh	15 May 1705	Newton	Lancaster		
John Ward	15 May 1705	Newton	Lancaster		
Francis Annesley	15 May 1705	Preston	Lancaster		
Edward Rigby	15 May 1705	Preston	Lancaster	Died on 2 May 1706.	
Arthur Maynwaring	2 December 1706 (vice Rigby)	Preston	Lancaster		
Sir Roger Bradshaigh	15 May 1705	Wigan	Lancaster		
Emanuel Howe	15 May 1705	Wigan	Lancaster		
John Verney	17 May 1705	Leicestershire	Leicester	Died on 31 October 1707.	
John Wilkins	17 May 1705	Leicestershire	Leicester		
George Ashby	4 December 1707 (vice Verney)	Leicestershire	Leicester		
Sir George Beaumont	15 May 1705	Leicester	Leicester		
James Winstanley	15 May 1705	Leicester	Leicester		
George Whichcot	30 May 1705	Lincolnshire	Lincoln		
Albemarle Bertie	30 May 1705	Lincolnshire	Lincoln		
Sir Edward Irby	14 May 1705	Boston	Lincoln		
Richard Wynn	14 May 1705	Boston	Lincoln		
Marquess of Granby	14 May 1705	Grantham	Lincoln		
Sir William Ellys	14 May 1705	Grantham	Lincoln		
Arthur Moore	9 May 1705	Great Grimsby	Lincoln		
William Cotesworth	9 May 1705	Great Grimsby	Lincoln		
Thomas Lister	12 May 1705	Lincoln	Lincoln		
Sir Thomas Meres	12 May 1705	Lincoln	Lincoln		
Charles Cecil	12 May 1705	Stamford	Lincoln		
Charles Bertie	12 May 1705	Stamford	Lincoln		
Scorie Barker	28 May 1705	Middlesex	Middlesex		
Sir John Wolstenholme	28 May 1705	Middlesex	Middlesex		
Sir Robert Clayton	17 May 1705	London	Middlesex	Died on 16 July 1707.	
Sir William Ashurst	17 May 1705	London	Middlesex		
Sir Gilbert Heathcote	17 May 1705	London	Middlesex		
Samuel Shepheard	17 May 1705	London	Middlesex		
Sir William Withers	16 December 1707 (vice Clayton)	London	Middlesex		
Henry Boyle	30 May 1705	Westminster	Middlesex	Appointed Secretary of State for the Northern Department in February 1708.	
Sir Henry Dutton Colt	30 May 1705	Westminster	Middlesex		
Henry Boyle	21 February 1708 (re-elected)	Westminster	Middlesex		
John Morgan	23 May 1705	Monmouthshire	Monmouth		
Sir Hopton Williams	23 May 1705	Monmouthshire	Monmouth		
Sir Thomas Powell	14 May 1705	Monmouth	Monmouth		
Sir John Holland	30 May 1705	Norfolk	Norfolk		
Roger Townshend	30 May 1705	Norfolk	Norfolk		
Sir Robert Clayton	14 May 1705	Castle Rising	Norfolk	Chose to sit for London.	
Horatio Walpole	14 May 1705	Castle Rising	Norfolk		
William Feilding	29 November 1705 (vice Clayton)	Castle Rising	Norfolk		
Sir Charles Turner	12 May 1705	King's Lynn	Norfolk		
Robert Walpole	12 May 1705	King's Lynn	Norfolk	Appointed Secretary at War in February 1708.	
Robert Walpole	6 March 1708 (re-elected)	King's Lynn	Norfolk		
Waller Bacon	23 May 1705	Norwich	Norfolk	Double return: Bacon and Chambers were declared elected on 6 December 1705.	
John Chambers	23 May 1705	Norwich	Norfolk	Double return: Bacon and Chambers were declared elected on 6 December 1705.	
Thomas Blofield	23 May 1705	Norwich	Norfolk	Double return: Bacon and Chambers were declared elected on 6 December 1705.	
Thomas Palgrave	23 May 1705	Norwich	Norfolk	Double return: Bacon and Chambers were declared elected on 6 December 1705.	
Sir Thomas Hanmer	14 May 1705	Thetford	Norfolk		
Sir John Wodehouse	14 May 1705	Thetford	Norfolk		
Benjamin England	15 May 1705	Great Yarmouth	Norfolk		
John Nicholson	15 May 1705	Great Yarmouth	Norfolk		
Sir Justinian Isham	17 May 1705	Northamptonshire	Northampton		
Thomas Cartwright	17 May 1705	Northamptonshire	Northampton		
Charles Egerton	12 May 1705	Brackley	Northampton		
John Sydney	12 May 1705	Brackley	Northampton	Succeeded as Earl of Leicester on 24 July 1705.	
Harry Mordaunt	26 November 1705 (vice Sydney)	Brackley	Northampton		
Thomas Watson Wentworth	11 May 1705	Higham Ferrers	Northampton		
George Montagu	8 May 1705	Northampton	Northampton		
Francis Arundell	8 May 1705	Northampton	Northampton		
Sidney Wortley Montagu	10 May 1705	Peterborough	Northampton		
Sir Gilbert Dolben	10 May 1705	Peterborough	Northampton		
Thomas Forster	31 May 1705	Northumberland	Northumberland		
Sir John Delaval	31 May 1705	Northumberland	Northumberland		
Samuel Ogle	18 May 1705	Berwick-upon-Tweed	Northumberland		
Jonathan Hutchinson	18 May 1705	Berwick-upon-Tweed	Northumberland		
Sir Richard Sandford	18 May 1705	Morpeth	Northumberland		
Edmund Maine	18 May 1705	Morpeth	Northumberland		
Sir William Blackett	6 June 1705	Newcastle-upon-Tyne	Northumberland	Died in December 1705.	
William Carr	6 June 1705	Newcastle-upon-Tyne	Northumberland		
Sir Henry Liddell	2 January 1706 (vice Blackett)	Newcastle-upon-Tyne	Northumberland		
Sir Thomas Willoughby	23 May 1705	Nottinghamshire	Nottingham		
John Thornhagh	23 May 1705	Nottinghamshire	Nottingham		
James Saunderson	12 May 1705	Newark-on-Trent	Nottingham		
John Digby	12 May 1705	Newark-on-Trent	Nottingham		
Robert Sacheverell	16 May 1705	Nottingham	Nottingham		
William Pierrepont	16 May 1705	Nottingham	Nottingham	Died on 29 August 1706.	
John Plumptre	23 December 1706 (vice Pierrepont)	Nottingham	Nottingham		
Sir Willoughby Hickman	14 May 1705	East Retford	Nottingham	The election of Hickman and Levinz was overturned on petition, and Wasteneys and Molesworth declared elected.	
William Levinz	14 May 1705	East Retford	Nottingham	The election of Hickman and Levinz was overturned on petition, and Wasteneys and Molesworth declared elected.	
Sir Hardolph Wasteneys	17 January 1706 (vice Hickman and Levinz)	East Retford	Nottingham	The election of Hickman and Levinz was overturned on petition, and Wasteneys and Molesworth declared elected.	
Robert Molesworth	17 January 1706 (vice Hickman and Levinz)	East Retford	Nottingham	The election of Hickman and Levinz was overturned on petition, and Wasteneys and Molesworth declared elected.	
Sir Robert Jenkinson	9 May 1705	Oxfordshire	Oxford		
Sir Edward Norreys	9 May 1705	Oxfordshire	Oxford		
Charles North	8 May 1705	Banbury	Oxford		
Sir William Whitelocke	9 May 1705	Oxford University	Oxford		
William Bromley	9 May 1705	Oxford University	Oxford		
Thomas Rowney	8 May 1705	Oxford	Oxford		
Francis Norreys	8 May 1705	Oxford	Oxford	Died on 6 June 1706.	
Sir John Walter	11 December 1706 (vice Norreys)	Oxford	Oxford		
Charles Bertie	11 May 1705	New Woodstock	Oxford		
William Cadogan	11 May 1705	New Woodstock	Oxford		
Sir Thomas Mackworth	16 May 1705	Rutland	Rutland		
Richard Halford	16 May 1705	Rutland	Rutland		
Sir Robert Corbet	24 May 1705	Shropshire	Salop		
Robert Lloyd	24 May 1705	Shropshire	Salop		
Henry Brett	12 May 1705	Bishop's Castle	Salop		
Charles Mason	12 May 1705	Bishop's Castle	Salop	Chose to sit for Montgomery.	
Henry Newport	5 March 1706 (vice Mason)	Bishop's Castle	Salop		
Sir Humphrey Briggs	11 May 1705	Bridgnorth	Salop		
William Whitmore	11 May 1705	Bridgnorth	Salop		
Sir Thomas Powys	16 May 1705	Ludlow	Salop		
Acton Baldwyn	16 May 1705	Ludlow	Salop		
John Kynaston	14 May 1705	Shrewsbury	Salop		
Richard Mytton	14 May 1705	Shrewsbury	Salop		
Sir William Forester	12 May 1705	Much Wenlock	Salop		
George Weld	12 May 1705	Much Wenlock	Salop		
Nathaniel Palmer	30 May 1705	Somerset	Somerset		
John Pigott	30 May 1705	Somerset	Somerset		
William Blathwayt	15 May 1705	Bath	Somerset		
Alexander Popham	15 May 1705	Bath	Somerset	Died on 16 June 1705.	
Samuel Trotman	20 February 1707 (vice Popham)	Bath	Somerset		
Sir Thomas Wroth	16 May 1705	Bridgwater	Somerset		
George Balch	16 May 1705	Bridgwater	Somerset		
Edward Strode	18 May 1705	Ilchester	Somerset		
John Webb	18 May 1705	Ilchester	Somerset		
Sir Thomas Travell	16 May 1705	Milborne Port	Somerset		
Thomas Medlycott	16 May 1705	Milborne Port	Somerset		
Alexander Luttrell	12 May 1705	Minehead	Somerset		
Sir Jacob Banks	12 May 1705	Minehead	Somerset		
Edward Clarke	14 May 1705	Taunton	Somerset		
Sir Francis Warre	14 May 1705	Taunton	Somerset		
Maurice Berkeley	14 May 1705	Wells	Somerset		
Henry Portman	14 May 1705	Wells	Somerset		
Thomas Jervoise	16 May 1705	Southamptonshire	Southampton		
Richard Chaundler	16 May 1705	Southamptonshire	Southampton		
John Smith	11 May 1705	Andover	Southampton		
Francis Shepheard	11 May 1705	Andover	Southampton		
Francis Gwyn	12 May 1705	Christchurch	Southampton		
William Ettrick	12 May 1705	Christchurch	Southampton		
Thomas Dore	12 May 1705	New Lymington	Southampton	Died in October 1705.	
Paul Burrard	12 May 1705	New Lymington	Southampton	As a sub-Commissioner for Prizes at Portsmouth, disqualified under the Regency Act in November 1707.	
Marquess of Winchester	7 December 1705 (vice Dore)	New Lymington	Southampton		
Paul Burrard	2 December 1707 (re-elected)	New Lymington	Southampton		
The Lord Cutts	11 May 1705	Newport	Southampton	Died on 25 January 1707.	
William Stephens	11 May 1705	Newport	Southampton		
Sir Tristram Dillington	3 March 1707 (vice Cutts)	Newport	Southampton		
James Worsley	12 May 1705	Newtown	Southampton		
Henry Worsley	12 May 1705	Newtown	Southampton		
Leonard Bilson	11 May 1705	Petersfield	Southampton		
Norton Powlett	11 May 1705	Petersfield	Southampton		
Sir George Rooke	10 May 1705	Portsmouth	Southampton		
William Gifford (knighted 6 September 1705)	10 May 1705	Portsmouth	Southampton		
Viscount Woodstock	12 May 1705	Southampton	Southampton		
Adam de Cardonnel	12 May 1705	Southampton	Southampton		
Sir John Hawles	10 May 1705	Stockbridge	Southampton		
Sir Edward Lawrence	10 May 1705	Stockbridge	Southampton		
Richard Wollaston	10 May 1705	Whitchurch	Southampton		
John Shrimpton	10 May 1705	Whitchurch	Southampton	Died on 24 December 1707.	
Frederick Tylney	17 January 1708 (vice Shrimpton)	Whitchurch	Southampton	The election of Tylney was overturned on petition, and Wither declared elected.	
Charles Wither	17 February 1708 (vice Tylney)	Whitchurch	Southampton	The election of Tylney was overturned on petition, and Wither declared elected.	
Lord William Powlett	9 May 1705	Winchester	Southampton		
George Rodney Brydges	9 May 1705	Winchester	Southampton		
Henry Holmes	10 May 1705	Yarmouth	Southampton		
Anthony Morgan	10 May 1705	Yarmouth	Southampton		
Henry Paget	10 May 1705	Staffordshire	Stafford		
Sir Edward Bagot	10 May 1705	Staffordshire	Stafford		
Richard Dyott	10 May 1705	Lichfield	Stafford		
Sir Henry Gough	10 May 1705	Lichfield	Stafford		
Sir Thomas Bellot	11 May 1705	Newcastle-under-Lyme	Stafford	The election of Bellot and Cotton was overturned on petition, and Offley and Lawton declared elected.	
Rowland Cotton	11 May 1705	Newcastle-under-Lyme	Stafford	The election of Bellot and Cotton was overturned on petition, and Offley and Lawton declared elected.	
Crewe Offley	27 February 1706 (vice Bellot and Cotton)	Newcastle-under-Lyme	Stafford	The election of Bellot and Cotton was overturned on petition, and Offley and Lawton declared elected.	
John Lawton	27 February 1706 (vice Bellot and Cotton)	Newcastle-under-Lyme	Stafford	The election of Bellot and Cotton was overturned on petition, and Offley and Lawton declared elected.	
Walter Chetwynd	9 May 1705	Stafford	Stafford		
Thomas Foley	9 May 1705	Stafford	Stafford		
Joseph Girdler	14 May 1705	Tamworth	Stafford		
Thomas Guy	14 May 1705	Tamworth	Stafford		
The Earl of Dysart	9 May 1705	Suffolk	Suffolk	As a peer of Scotland, disqualified under the Act of Union on 1 May 1707.	
Sir Robert Davers	9 May 1705	Suffolk	Suffolk		
Leicester Martin	3 December 1707 (vice Dysart)	Suffolk	Suffolk		
Sir Henry Johnson	11 May 1705	Aldeburgh	Suffolk		
William Johnson	11 May 1705	Aldeburgh	Suffolk		
Sir Thomas Felton	9 May 1705	Bury St Edmunds	Suffolk		
Sir Robert Davers	9 May 1705	Bury St Edmunds	Suffolk	Chose to sit for Suffolk.	
Aubrey Porter	1 December 1705 (vice Davers)	Bury St Edmunds	Suffolk		
Sir Charles Blois	12 May 1705	Dunwich	Suffolk		
John Rous	12 May 1705	Dunwich	Suffolk		
Spencer Compton	11 May 1705	Eye	Suffolk		
Sir Joseph Jekyll	11 May 1705	Eye	Suffolk		
Henry Poley	11 May 1705	Ipswich	Suffolk	Died on 7 August 1707.	
John Bence	11 May 1705	Ipswich	Suffolk		
William Churchill	21 November 1707 (vice Poley)	Ipswich	Suffolk		
Sir Edmund Bacon	11 May 1705	Orford	Suffolk		
Sir Edward Turnor	11 May 1705	Orford	Suffolk		
Sir Gervase Elwes	10 May 1705	Sudbury	Suffolk	Died on 11 April 1706.	
Philip Skippon	10 May 1705	Sudbury	Suffolk		
Sir Hervey Elwes	16 December 1706 (vice Elwes)	Sudbury	Suffolk		
Sir Richard Onslow	30 May 1705	Surrey	Surrey		
Sir William Scawen	30 May 1705	Surrey	Surrey		
John Ward	10 May 1705	Bletchingley	Surrey		
George Evelyn	10 May 1705	Bletchingley	Surrey		
George Newland (knighted 3 June 1706)	9 May 1705	Gatton	Surrey		
Paul Docminique	9 May 1705	Gatton	Surrey		
Denzil Onslow	8 May 1705	Guildford	Surrey		
Robert Wroth	8 May 1705	Guildford	Surrey		
George Woodroffe	9 May 1705	Haslemere	Surrey		
John Fulham	9 May 1705	Haslemere	Surrey		
Sir John Parsons	8 May 1705	Reigate	Surrey		
Stephen Hervey	8 May 1705	Reigate	Surrey	Died on 24 May 1707.	
James Cocks	29 November 1707 (vice Hervey)	Reigate	Surrey		
John Cholmley	9 May 1705	Southwark	Surrey		
Charles Cox	9 May 1705	Southwark	Surrey		
John Morley Trevor	24 May 1705	Sussex	Sussex		
Sir George Parker	24 May 1705	Sussex	Sussex		
James Butler	9 May 1705	Arundel	Sussex		
Edmund Dummer	9 May 1705	Arundel	Sussex		
John Asgill	7 May 1705	Bramber	Sussex	Expelled from the House for blasphemy on 18 December 1707.	
The Viscount Windsor	7 May 1705	Bramber	Sussex		
William Shippen	29 December 1707 (vice Asgill)	Bramber	Sussex		
William Elson	10 May 1705	Chichester	Sussex	Died before 23 October 1705.	
Sir Thomas Littleton	10 May 1705	Chichester	Sussex		
Thomas Onslow	26 November 1705 (vice Elson)	Chichester	Sussex		
John Conyers	11 May 1705	East Grinstead	Sussex		
John Toke	11 May 1705	East Grinstead	Sussex		
Charles Eversfield	10 May 1705	Horsham	Sussex		
Henry Cowper	10 May 1705	Horsham	Sussex	Died on 22 March 1707.	
Henry Goring	4 April 1707 (vice Cowper)	Horsham	Sussex		
Thomas Pelham	19 May 1705	Lewes	Sussex		
Richard Payne	19 May 1705	Lewes	Sussex		
Robert Orme	9 May 1705	Midhurst	Sussex		
Laurence Alcock	9 May 1705	Midhurst	Sussex		
Nathaniel Gould	11 May 1705	New Shoreham	Sussex		
John Wicker	11 May 1705	New Shoreham	Sussex		
William Wallis	10 May 1705	Steyning	Sussex		
Charles Goring	10 May 1705	Steyning	Sussex		
Sir John Mordaunt	16 May 1705	Warwickshire	Warwick		
Sir Charles Shuckburgh	16 May 1705	Warwickshire	Warwick	Died on 2 September 1705.	
Andrew Archer	28 November 1705 (vice Shuckburgh)	Warwickshire	Warwick		
Sir Christopher Hales	22 May 1705	Coventry	Warwick	Election declared void on 5 February 1707.	
Thomas Gery	22 May 1705	Coventry	Warwick	Election declared void on 5 February 1707.	
Sir Orlando Bridgeman	25 February 1707 (vice Hales and Gery)	Coventry	Warwick		
Edward Hopkins	25 February 1707 (vice Hales and Gery)	Coventry	Warwick		
Francis Greville	9 May 1705	Warwick	Warwick		
Dodington Greville	9 May 1705	Warwick	Warwick		
Henry Grahme	5 June 1705	Westmorland	Westmorland	Died on 7 January 1707.	
Robert Lowther	5 June 1705	Westmorland	Westmorland		
Michael Fleming	20 February 1707 (vice Grahme)	Westmorland	Westmorland		
James Grahme	19 May 1705	Appleby	Westmorland		
William Harvey	19 May 1705	Appleby	Westmorland		
Sir Richard Howe	22 May 1705	Wiltshire	Wilts		
Robert Hyde	22 May 1705	Wiltshire	Wilts		
Sir George Byng	12 May 1705	Great Bedwyn	Wilts	Chose to sit for Plymouth.	
Nicholas Pollexfen	12 May 1705	Great Bedwyn	Wilts	As a Commissioner for Prizes, disqualified under the Regency Act in November 1707.	
Lord Bruce	7 December 1705 (vice Byng)	Great Bedwyn	Wilts		
Tracy Pauncefort	29 November 1707 (vice Pollexfen)	Great Bedwyn	Wilts	The election of Pauncefort was overturned on petition, and Pollexfen declared elected.	
Nicholas Pollexfen	22 December 1707 (vice Pauncefort)	Great Bedwyn	Wilts	The election of Pauncefort was overturned on petition, and Pollexfen declared elected.	
Edward Bayntun	11 May 1705	Calne	Wilts		
George Duckett	11 May 1705	Calne	Wilts		
Sir James Long	11 May 1705	Chippenham	Wilts		
Walter White	11 May 1705	Chippenham	Wilts	Died on 21 July 1705.	
Viscount Mordaunt	26 November 1705 (vice White)	Chippenham	Wilts		
Edmund Dunch	12 May 1705	Cricklade	Wilts		
Samuel Barker	12 May 1705	Cricklade	Wilts		
Sir Francis Child	11 May 1705	Devizes	Wilts		
John Methuen	11 May 1705	Devizes	Wilts	Died on 13 July 1706.	
Josiah Diston	11 December 1706 (vice Methuen)	Devizes	Wilts		
Charles Duncombe	12 May 1705	Downton	Wilts		
John Eyre	12 May 1705	Downton	Wilts		
Edward Ashe	11 May 1705	Heytesbury	Wilts		
William Monson	11 May 1705	Heytesbury	Wilts		
George Morley	11 May 1705	Hindon	Wilts		
Reynolds Calthorpe	11 May 1705	Hindon	Wilts		
Walter Kent	14 May 1705	Ludgershall	Wilts		
Thomas Powell	14 May 1705	Ludgershall	Wilts	The election of Powell was overturned on petition, and Webb declared elected.	
John Richmond Webb	17 January 1706 (vice Powell)	Ludgershall	Wilts	The election of Powell was overturned on petition, and Webb declared elected.	
Thomas Farrington	14 May 1705	Malmesbury	Wilts		
Henry Mordaunt	14 May 1705	Malmesbury	Wilts		
Edward Ashe	11 May 1705	Marlborough	Wilts	Chose to sit for Heytesbury.	
John Jeffreys	11 May 1705	Marlborough	Wilts		
Earl of Hertford	27 November 1705 (vice Ashe)	Marlborough	Wilts		
Robert Pitt	10 May 1705	Old Sarum	Wilts		
Charles Mompesson	10 May 1705	Old Sarum	Wilts	Double return: Mompesson was declared elected on 11 December 1705.	
The Viscount Grandison	10 May 1705	Old Sarum	Wilts	Double return: Mompesson was declared elected on 11 December 1705.	
Robert Eyre	10 May 1705	New Sarum	Wilts		
Charles Fox	10 May 1705	New Sarum	Wilts		
Robert Bertie	10 May 1705	Westbury	Wilts		
Henry Bertie	10 May 1705	Westbury	Wilts		
John Gauntlett	10 May 1705	Wilton	Wilts		
William Nicholas	10 May 1705	Wilton	Wilts		
Henry St John	12 May 1705	Wootton Bassett	Wilts		
John Morton Pleydell	12 May 1705	Wootton Bassett	Wilts	Died on 11 February 1706.	
Francis Popham	2 March 1706 (vice Pleydell)	Wootton Bassett	Wilts		
Sir John Pakington	23 May 1705	Worcestershire	Worcester		
William Bromley	23 May 1705	Worcestershire	Worcester	Died on 5 August 1707.	
Sir Thomas Cookes Winford	3 December 1707 (vice Bromley)	Worcestershire	Worcester		
Salwey Winnington	11 May 1705	Bewdley	Worcester		
Charles Cocks	11 May 1705	Droitwich	Worcester		
Edward Foley	11 May 1705	Droitwich	Worcester		
John Rudge	15 May 1705	Evesham	Worcester		
Hugh Parker	15 May 1705	Evesham	Worcester		
Thomas Wylde	21 May 1705	Worcester	Worcester		
Samuel Swift	21 May 1705	Worcester	Worcester		
Marquess of Hartington	23 May 1705	Yorkshire	York	Succeeded as Duke of Devonshire on 18 August 1707.	
Sir John Kaye	23 May 1705	Yorkshire	York	Died on 8 August 1706.	
The Lord Fairfax of Cameron	1 January 1707 (vice Kaye)	Yorkshire	York	As a peer of Scotland, disqualified under the Act of Union on 1 May 1707.	
The Viscount Downe	3 December 1707 (vice Hartington and Fairfax)	Yorkshire	York		
Conyers Darcy	3 December 1707 (vice Hartington and Fairfax)	Yorkshire	York		
Robert Monckton	16 May 1705	Aldborough	York		
William Jessop	16 May 1705	Aldborough	York	Appointed justice of the Anglesey Circuit in summer 1707.	
William Jessop	29 November 1707 (re-elected)	Aldborough	York		
Sir Charles Hotham	16 May 1705	Beverley	York		
John Moyser	16 May 1705	Beverley	York		
John Stapylton	14 May 1705	Boroughbridge	York		
Craven Peyton	14 May 1705	Boroughbridge	York		
Anthony Duncombe	15 May 1705	Hedon	York	As a Commissioner of Prizes, disqualified under the Regency Act in November 1707.	
William Pulteney	15 May 1705	Hedon	York		
Anthony Duncombe	1 December 1707 (re-elected)	Hedon	York		
Sir William St Quintin	19 May 1705	Kingston upon Hull	York		
William Maister	19 May 1705	Kingston upon Hull	York		
Christopher Walters Stockdale	12 May 1705	Knaresborough	York		
Robert Byerley	12 May 1705	Knaresborough	York		
Sir William Strickland	16 May 1705	Malton	York		
William Palmes	16 May 1705	Malton	York		
Sir William Hustler	15 May 1705	Northallerton	York		
Robert Dormer	15 May 1705	Northallerton	York	Chose to sit for Buckinghamshire.	
Roger Gale	3 December 1705 (vice Dormer)	Northallerton	York		
Sir John Bland	14 May 1705	Pontefract	York		
William Lowther	14 May 1705	Pontefract	York		
Thomas Yorke	14 May 1705	Richmond	York		
Wharton Dunch	14 May 1705	Richmond	York	Died before 22 September 1705.	
William Walsh	6 December 1705 (vice Dunch)	Richmond	York		
John Aislabie	14 May 1705	Ripon	York		
John Sharp	14 May 1705	Ripon	York		
Robert Squire	14 May 1705	Scarborough	York	Died on 8 October 1707.	
William Thompson	14 May 1705	Scarborough	York		
John Hungerford	22 November 1707 (vice Squire)	Scarborough	York		
Sir Thomas Frankland	16 May 1705	Thirsk	York		
Sir Godfrey Copley	16 May 1705	Thirsk	York		
Sir William Robinson	16 May 1705	York	York		
Robert Benson	16 May 1705	York	York		
Matthew Aylmer	10 May 1705	Dover	Cinque Ports		
Philip Papillon	10 May 1705	Dover	Cinque Ports		
William Ashburnham	12 May 1705	Hastings	Cinque Ports		
John Pulteney	12 May 1705	Hastings	Cinque Ports		
Sir Philip Boteler	12 May 1705	Hythe	Cinque Ports		
John Boteler	12 May 1705	Hythe	Cinque Ports		
John Brewer	15 May 1705	New Romney	Cinque Ports	As Receiver-General of Prizes, disqualified under the Regency Act on 18 November 1707.	
Walter Whitfield	15 May 1705	New Romney	Cinque Ports		
John Brewer	28 November 1707 (re-elected)	New Romney	Cinque Ports		
Edward Southwell	14 May 1705	Rye	Cinque Ports		
Philip Herbert	14 May 1705	Rye	Cinque Ports	As a Commissioner for Sick and Wounded Seamen and for the Exchange of Prisoners, disqualified under the Regency Act on 18 November 1707.	
Phillips Gybbon	2 December 1707 (vice Herbert)	Rye	Cinque Ports		
Sir Henry Furnese	10 May 1705	Sandwich	Cinque Ports		
Josiah Burchett	10 May 1705	Sandwich	Cinque Ports	Appointed secretary to the Marines in February 1708.	
Josiah Burchett	2 March 1708 (re-elected)	Sandwich	Cinque Ports		
Sir William Thomas	10 May 1705	Seaford	Cinque Ports	Died on 18 November 1706.	
William Lowndes	10 May 1705	Seaford	Cinque Ports		
George Naylor	12 December 1706 (vice Thomas)	Seaford	Cinque Ports		
George Dodington	12 May 1705	Winchelsea	Cinque Ports		
James Hayes	12 May 1705	Winchelsea	Cinque Ports		
The Viscount Bulkeley	29 May 1705	Anglesey	Anglesey		
Henry Bertie	21 May 1705	Beaumaris	Anglesey		
Sir Edward Williams	30 May 1705	Breconshire	Brecon		
Sir Jeffrey Jeffreys	12 May 1705	Brecon	Brecon		
John Pugh	6 June 1705	Cardiganshire	Cardigan		
Lewis Pryse	22 May 1705	Cardigan	Cardigan		
Griffith Rice	17 May 1705	Carmarthenshire	Carmarthen		
Richard Vaughan	21 May 1705	Carmarthen	Carmarthen		
Sir John Wynn	6 June 1705	Carnarvonshire	Carnarvon		
Thomas Bulkeley	24 May 1705	Carnarvon	Carnarvon		
Sir Richard Myddelton	19 May 1705	Denbighshire	Denbigh		
William Robinson	18 May 1705	Denbigh	Denbigh		
Sir John Conway	23 May 1705	Flintshire	Flint		
Sir Roger Mostyn	29 May 1705	Flint	Flint		
Thomas Mansel (succeeded as baronet 17 November 1706)	30 May 1705	Glamorganshire	Glamorgan		
Thomas Mansel	30 May 1705	Cardiff	Glamorgan	Died on 7 January 1706.	
Sir John Aubrey	1 February 1706 (vice Mansel)	Cardiff	Glamorgan		
Richard Vaughan	22 May 1705	Merionethshire	Merioneth		
Edward Vaughan	22 May 1705	Montgomeryshire	Montgomery		
Charles Mason	18 May 1705	Montgomery	Montgomery		
Wirriot Owen	5 June 1705	Pembrokeshire	Pembroke		
John Laugharne	29 May 1705	Haverfordwest	Pembroke		
John Meyrick	21 May 1705	Pembroke	Pembroke		
Thomas Harley	21 May 1705	Radnorshire	Radnor		
Robert Harley	21 May 1705	New Radnor	Radnor		
=== Scottish members from 1707 ===
William Nisbet	2 September 1702 (Note: Date of election to the Parliament of Scotland. The Scottish members took their seats at Westminster in November 1707.)	Haddingtonshire	Haddington		
John Cockburn	1 June 1703	Haddingtonshire	Haddington		
Sir John Swinton	22 October 1702	Berwickshire	Berwick		
Sir William Kerr	6 October 1702	Roxburghshire	Roxburgh		
Archibald Douglas	6 October 1702	Roxburghshire	Roxburgh		
William Bennet	6 October 1702	Roxburghshire	Roxburgh		
John Murray	8 October 1702	Selkirkshire	Selkirk		
John Pringle	18 May 1703	Selkirkshire	Selkirk		
William Morison	29 September 1702	Peeblesshire	Peebles		
George Baillie	24 September 1702	Lanarkshire	Lanark		
Sir John Johnstone	6 October 1702	Dumfriesshire	Dumfries		
John Stewart	28 October 1702	Wigtownshire	Wigtown		
Francis Montgomerie	6 October 1702	Ayrshire	Ayr		
William Dalrymple	6 October 1702	Ayrshire	Ayr		
Sir Robert Pollock	29 September 1702	Renfrewshire	Renfrew		
John Haldane	6 October 1702	Perthshire	Perth		
Mungo Graham	6 October 1702	Perthshire	Perth		
Sir Thomas Burnett	2 October 1702	Kincardineshire	Kincardine		
Sir David Ramsay	19 June 1705	Kincardineshire	Kincardine		
William Seton	6 October 1702	Aberdeenshire	Aberdeen		
Alexander Grant	6 October 1702	Inverness-shire	Inverness		
Hugh Rose	13 October 1702	Nairnshire	Nairn		
Sir Kenneth Mackenzie	30 September 1702	Cromartyshire	Cromarty		
John Campbell	29 October 1702	Argyllshire	Argyll		
Sir James Campbell	29 October 1702	Argyllshire	Argyll		
James Campbell	29 October 1702	Argyllshire	Argyll		
James Halyburton	22 September 1702	Forfarshire	Forfar		
Alexander Abercromby	25 June 1706	Banffshire	Banff		
Sir Alexander Douglas	29 September 1702	Orkney	Orkney		
John Bruce	1 October 1702	Kinross-shire	Kinross		
Sir Patrick Johnstone	11 September 1702	Edinburgh	Edinburgh		
John Erskine	12 September 1702	Stirling	Stirling		
Hugh Montgomerie	10 October 1702	Glasgow	Lanark		
James Scott	4 November 1702	Montrose	Forfar		
Sir John Erskine	26 September 1702	Burntisland	Fife		
Patrick Moncreiff	18 June 1706	Kinghorn	Fife		
Sir Andrew Hume	14 September 1702	Kirkcudbright	Kirkcudbright		
Sir Peter Halkett	19 May 1705	Dunfermline	Fife		
Sir James Smollett	6 October 1702	Dumbarton	Dumbarton		
Sir David Dalrymple	18 September 1702	Culross	Perth		
John Clerk	24 October 1702	Whithorn	Wigtown		
Patrick Ogilvy	9 October 1702	Cullen	Banff		
Sir George Allardice	21 September 1702	Kintore	Aberdeen		
Daniel Campbell	16 October 1702	Inveraray	Argyll		
Alexander Maitland	24 September 1702	Inverbervie	Kincardine		

== See also ==
1705 English general election

== Sources ==
- Return of Members of Parliament, 1696 to 1877, Part II (PDF). 1879.
- Chris Cook and John Stevenson, British Historical Facts, 1688–1760. 1988.
- D. Hayton, E. Cruickshanks, and S. Handley eds, The History of Parliament: the House of Commons 1690-1715. 2002.
