= Portrait of a Man (Rosso Fiorentino) =

Painting by Rosso Fiorentino

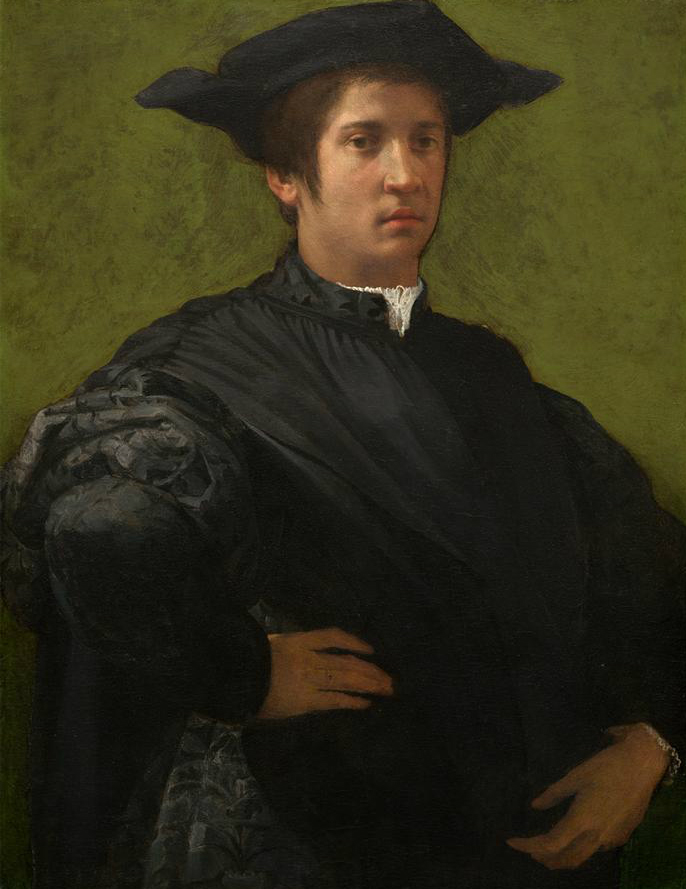
Portrait of a Man (c. 1522) by Rosso Fiorentino

Portrait of a Man is an oil on panel painting by Rosso Fiorentino, created c. 1522. it is held in the National Gallery of Art, in Washington, DC.

Its style is similar to that of Marriage of the Virgin (1523) and an X-ray has shown that it re-used a fragment of another work, possibly an altarpiece rejected by its commissioner such as the Spedalingo Altarpiece. The fragment shows a female saint in profile similar to the Saint Apollonia in Marriage and the Saint Agatha in Francesco Vanni's altarpiece for the collegiate church in Asciano. Rosso's Cherub Playing a Lute (1521) is similar to a section of the latter and may have originally formed part of a single painting by Rosso, split up for unknown reasons but seen in copy by Vanni, who then copied it for his Asciano work.

It is first recorded in 1857, when it was owned by Sir Thomas Sebright in Beechwood Park. It then passed through other British collections with an attribution to Andrea del Sarto, until the 1930s when it was acquired by Alessandro Contini-Bonacossi. He then sold it in 1950 to the Samuel H. Kress Foundation, which then donated it to its present owner in 1961.

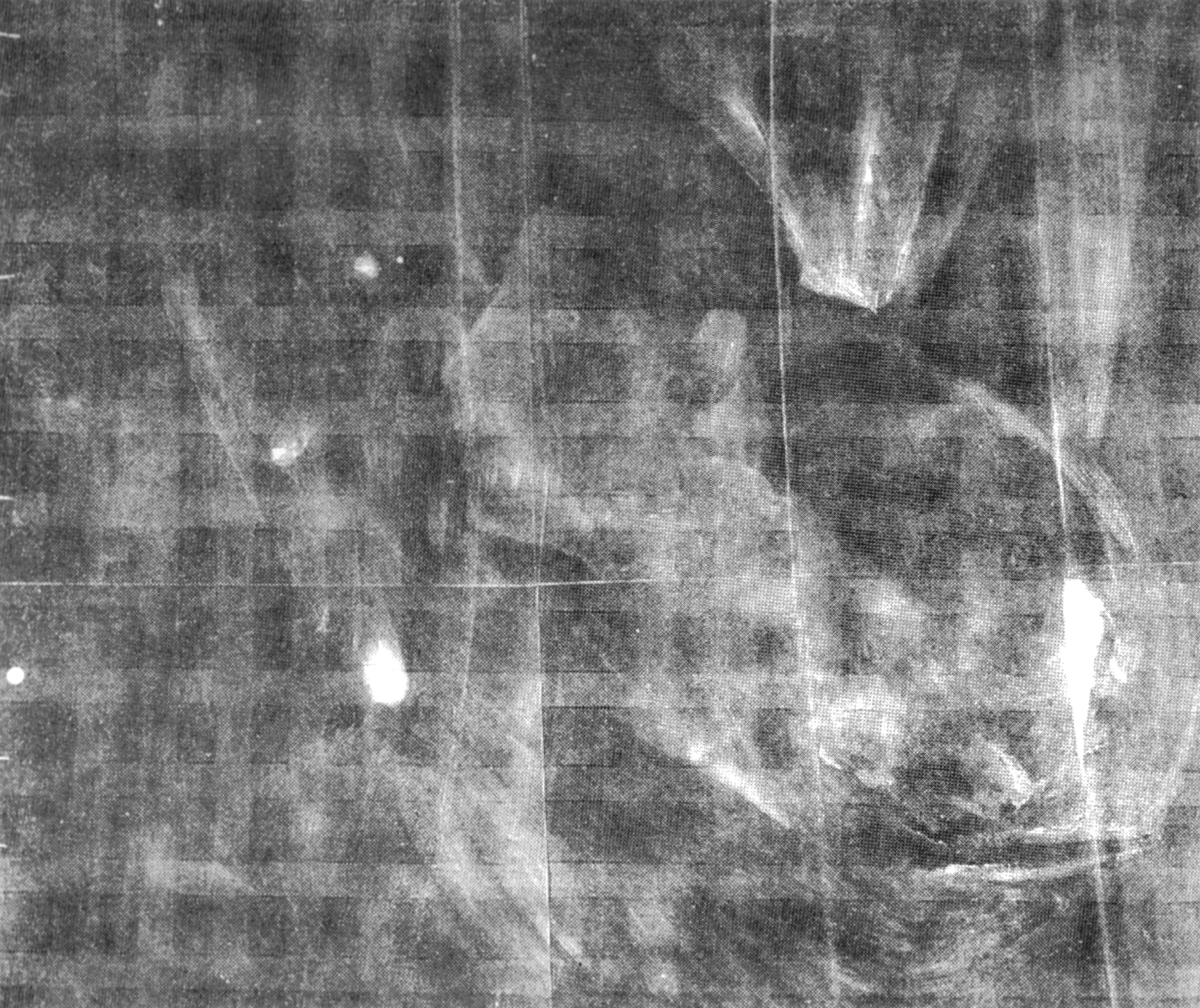
X-ray of the work

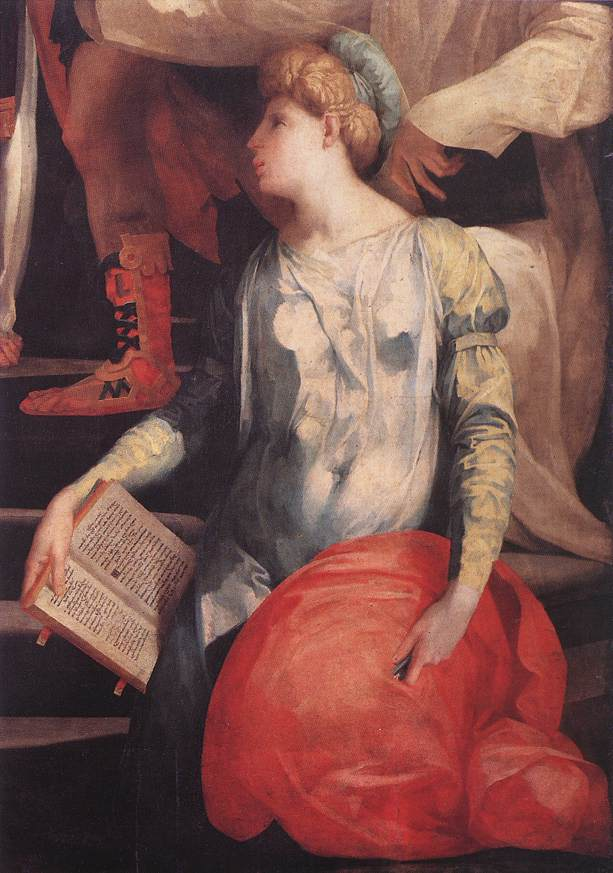
Saint Apollonia in Marriage of the Virgin (Pala Ginori)

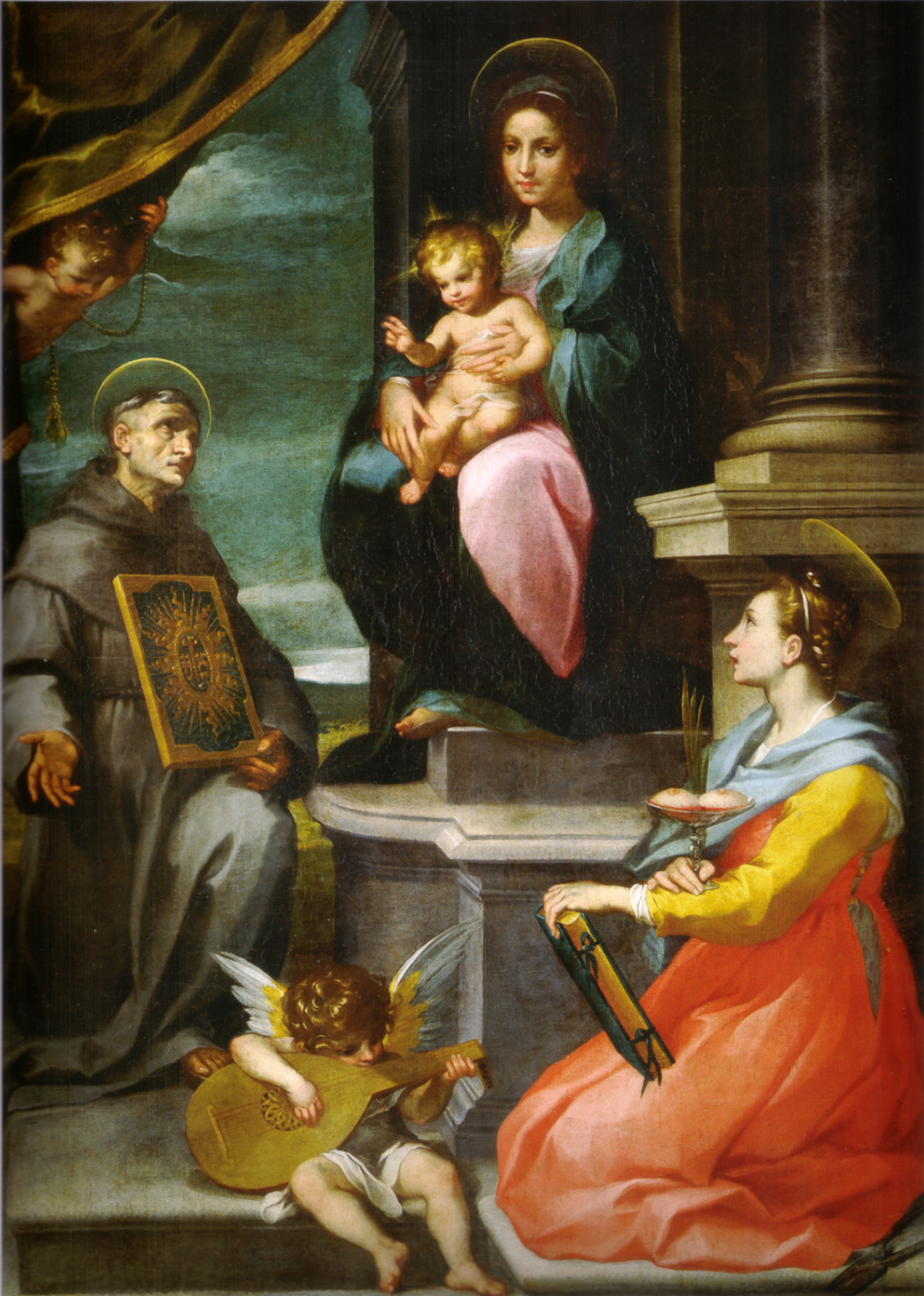
Francesco Vanni, altarpiece for the collegiate church in Asciano, 1600

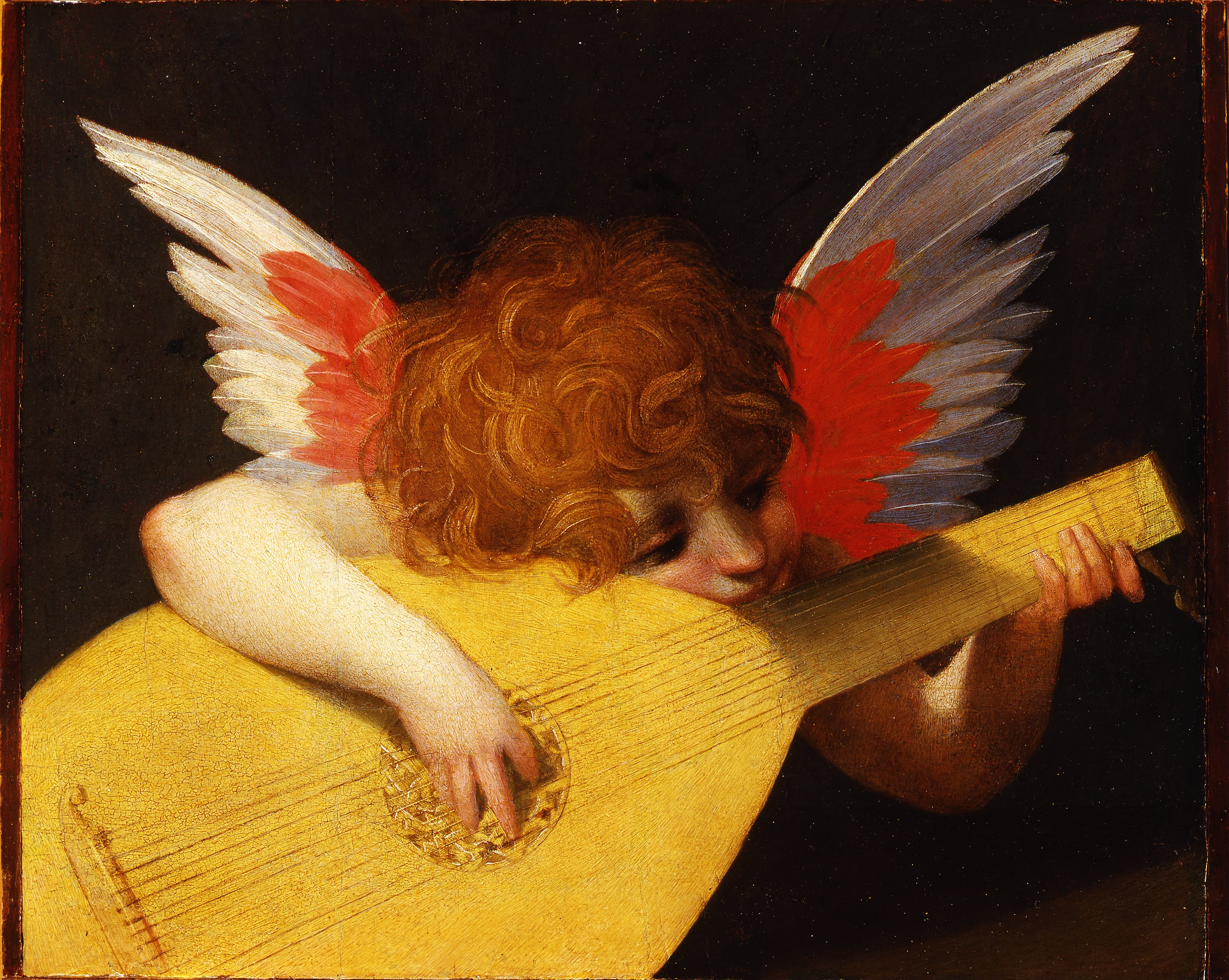
Cherub Playing a Lute, Uffizi

== Bibliography ==
- (in Italian) Antonio Natali, Rosso Fiorentino, Silvana Editore, Milano 2006. ISBN 88-366-0631-8
