= John Dryden (disambiguation) =

John Dryden (1631–1700) was an influential English poet, literary critic, translator and playwright.

John Dryden may also refer to:

== Politicians ==
- John Dryden (English politician) (c. 1641 – 1708), English MP for Huntingdonshire
- John Dryden (Ontario politician) (1840–1909), farmer and politician
- John C. Dryden (1893–1952), Manitoba politician
- John D. S. Dryden (1814–1886), justice of the Missouri Supreme Court
- John F. Dryden (1839–1911), New Jersey politician and founder of the Prudential Insurance Company
- Sir John Dryden, 2nd Baronet (c. 1580 – c. 1658), English MP for Northamptonshire
- John Dryden Kuser (1897–1964), New Jersey politician

== Others ==
- John Dryden (English footballer) or Jackie Dryden (1919–2004), English association footballer
- John Dryden (footballer), New Zealand association footballer
- John Dryden (writer, died 1701) (c. 1668 – 1701), son of the poet and a minor playwright
