= William Plumer (disambiguation) =

William Plumer may refer to:

- William Plumer (died 1767) (c. 1686-1767), British member of Parliament for Hertfordshire and Yarmouth (Isle of Wight)
- William Plumer (1736–1822), British member of Parliament for Hertfordshire, Lewes and Higham Ferrers
- William Plumer (1759–1850), U.S. politician from New Hampshire
- William Plumer Jr. (1789-1854) was a U.S. representative from New Hampshire, son of William Plumer
- William Swan Plumer (1802-1880), American clergyman

== See also ==
- Bill Plummer, baseball player
- William Plummer (disambiguation)
