= Paggen Hale =

Paggen Hale (c. 1715 – 3 April 1755) was a British politician, who served as MP for Hertfordshire.

Hale was the second son of William Hale MP of King's Walden, Hertfordshire, and his wife Catherine, daughter of Peter Paggen of Wandsworth, Surrey. William Hale died in 1717, and in 1722 Catherine remarried Humphry Morice MP, later Governor of the Bank of England. Hale's half-brother (Morice and Catherine's son) was Humphry Morice MP.

Hale entered Gray's Inn in 1732, and was called to the bar in 1739.

On 20 November 1742, Hale married his step-sister Elizabeth, daughter of Humphry Morice by his first marriage. They had no children.

Hale, a government supporter, and Charles Gore, who had gone over to support the government, were elected unopposed for Hertfordshire in 1747. In 1754, Gore and Hale were opposed by Edward Gardiner (Tory), but were re-elected.

Hale died on 3 April 1755, aged 40.

Parliament of Great Britain
Preceded by Jacob Houblon; Charles Gore	Member of Parliament for Hertfordshire; 1747–1755; With: Charles Gore	Succeeded by William Plumer; Charles Gore
