= Mary Caesar =

English writer and Jacobite activist

- Born: Mary Freman (Freeman) c. 3 October 1677; Aspenden, Hertfordshire, England
- Died: July 1741
- Notable works: Unpublished historical chronicle
- Spouse: Charles Caesar (m. 1702)
- Relatives: Ralph Freman (1627–1714) (father); Ralph Freman (1666–1742) (brother)

Mary Caesar (c. 3 October 1677 – July 1741), born Mary Freman, (Note: Or 'Freeman'.) was an English writer and Jacobite activist. Her only known work, unpublished in her lifetime, chronicles the early 18th century from a Jacobite perspective.

== Life ==
Caesar was the daughter of Elizabeth Aubrey (1643–1720) and Ralph Freman (1627–1714), an MP for Hertfordshire and landowner, whom she regarded as 'Perfect in Every Virtue'. Her brother, also named Ralph and also at one point an MP for Hertfordshire, met with substantially less approbation from Caesar when he declared his support for the Hanoverian line.

Caesar married Charles Caesar (1673–1741), a Tory MP and fellow Jacobite, on 14 November 1702. She later worked as his election agent. They had four children, one of whom predeceased them in 1740.

She was a correspondent of Alexander Pope, from approximately 1723; Jonathan Swift; and Charles Jervas. She championed the poetry of Matthew Prior and arranged for financial support for his work and that of Pope, particularly his translation of the Odyssey.

One of Caesar's more distinctive habits was the collection of royal (and would-be royal) portraits. Among her favourites was, of course, one of James Francis Edward Stuart, the Old Pretender himself, which Anne Oglethorpe brought to her personally. She also designed some elements of the gardens at Benington, the Caesars' seat.

== Politics ==
Caesar's political views were extreme. Rumbold notes that she was 'reluctant … to admit any distinction between Tory and Jacobite', and frequently acted as a propagandist for the Jacobite cause among her acquaintances. Jones goes further: 'Mary Caesar', he writes, 'was committed body and soul to Jacobitism'.

Caesar was involved in a number of Jacobite plots, including one in 1716–17 in which Carl Gyllenborg had rallied various Jacobites, including Caesar's husband, to support a purported Swedish invasion to topple George I. Her husband was arrested in connection with the plot in the early hours of 30 January 1717. She acted as a go-between for imprisoned Tories even as she raised a family alone—while her husband was imprisoned in the Tower of London.

== Writing ==
Caesar's five-volume composition—which she began to write on 30 May 1724, following the death of Robert Harley, although it describes events as early as 1705—defies easy categorisation. Commentators agree that the work is highly partisan and selective in its description of both past and present, framing narratives of genealogy, politics, and history from an unambiguously Jacobite point of view. Accordingly, it omits mention of a number of significant events in Caesar's personal life, such as the death of one of her sons and an extended illness she suffers, in favour of discussions more congenial to a Jacobite framing.

The work comments on a number of significant events of the period, including the Atterbury Plot, the Excise Crisis that erupted in response to taxation policies of Robert Walpole, and the Porteous Riots. It also describes, in adulatory tones, a meeting Caesar had with Queen Anne before her death in 1714.

Rumbold remarks: '[d]espite its mixture of memoir, journal and commonplace book, it is in fact generated by a coherent vision of a group of friends formed in the golden age of Queen Anne, and the values which they embody for her'; and later that '[a]lthough ostensibly a prose narrative, Mary Caesar's book is in many respects closer to the panegyrical poetry of the Renaissance'.

Pickard suggests that the text represents Caesar's attempt to shape history through literary means: '[a]lthough Caesar's journal provides many instances of its author's involvement in political affairs, it is through her narration of those affairs that she can shape them most fully'. Pickard notes, however, that the text was likely not circulated widely during Caesar's lifetime, given the conspiratorial and underground character of Jacobitism.

Despite having penned a substantial composition, Caesar was a reluctant correspondent, later noting that '[a]s Righting was Never my tallent, so always avoid'd it. if possible'. Rumbold notes that, although her compositions are technically skilful (albeit written with unusual orthography), Caesar likely did not receive formal instruction.

== Sources ==
- Erskine-Hill, Howard (1982). "Under Which Caesar? Pope in the Journal of Mrs Charles Caesar, 1724–1741". The Review of English Studies. 33 (132): 436–444. doi:10.1093/res/XXXIII.132.436. ISSN 0034-6551. JSTOR 515842.
- Jones, Clyve (1991). "Jacobitism and the Historian: The Case of William, 1st Earl Cowper". Albion. 23 (4): 681–696. doi:10.2307/4050746. ISSN 0095-1390. JSTOR 4050746.
- Pickard, Claire (2006). Literary Jacobitism (DPhil thesis). University of Oxford.
- Rumbold, Valerie (1989). Women's Place in Pope's World. Cambridge: Cambridge University Press. ISBN 0-521-36308-X. OCLC 18981801.
- Rumbold, Valerie (1992). "The Jacobite Vision of Mary Caesar". In Grundy, Isobel; Wiseman, Susan (eds.). Women, Writing, History, 1640–1740. Athens, Georgia: University of Georgia Press. pp. 178–198. ISBN 0-8203-1440-4. OCLC 24908371.
