= William Plummer (disambiguation) =

William Plummer (1873–1943) was an African American cabinetmaker and inventor from Smyth County, Virginia.

William Plummer may also refer to:

- William Edmunds Plummer (1861–1918), member of the Wisconsin State Assembly
- W. H. Plummer (1860–1926), member of the Washington State Senate
- Bill Plummer (1947–2024), American baseball player and manager.

== See also ==
- William Plumer (disambiguation)
