= Thomas Halsey (died 1788) =

British merchant and politician

Thomas Halsey (c. 1731–1788) was a British merchant and politician who sat in the House of Commons between 1768 and 1784.

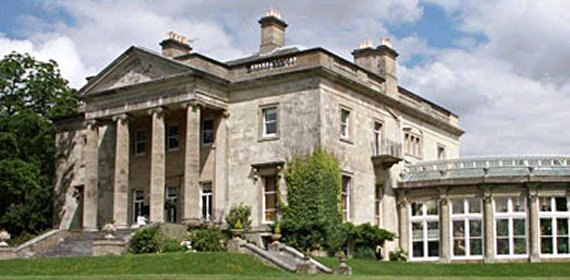
Gaddesden Place

Halsey was the son of Charles Halsey of Great Gaddesden, Hertfordshire and his wife Agatha Dorrien, daughter of Frederick Dorrien of London. His grandfather had been MP for Hertfordshire and his father, a younger son, was a London merchant in the Hamburg trade. His father in 1739 had inherited the family estates on the death of his elder brother. Halsey himself joined his father in the business, and in or before 1759 he went to Hamburg as a member of the firm of Hanbury and Halsey. In 1760 while still out there, he was appointed a commissary of control to the army under Prince Ferdinand which involved examining the execution of contracts.

In 1762 he succeeded to the family estates on the death of his brother, and in February 1763 returned to England, where he settled down as a country gentleman. In 1768 he began the building of Gaddesden Place. It is a large Palladian villa, which is said to be the first work of the architect James Wyatt. It was completed in 1774.

In the 1768 general election Halsey was returned unopposed as Member of Parliament for Hertfordshire. He was re-elected in the 1774 general election. In 1780 he was returned again after a contest. The English Chronicle wrote of him: “His infirm state of health prevents him from all attention to his parliamentary duty, sometimes for a whole sessions together. This amiable character, however, in private life, has so endeared him to his constituents, that notwithstanding several gentlemen of the first opulence in the country have attempted to supplant him, and have promised a stricter attention to the duties of so important a trust; their efforts have, hitherto, proved totally nugatory ... Mr. Halsey resides mostly in the country, where his humanity and generosity, and a friendly familiar intercourse with his neighbours, have gained him the most universal esteem” He stood for Hertfordshire again in 1784 but was defeated.

Halsey died on 9 October 1788, aged 57. He had married Sarah Crawley, daughter of John Crawley of Stockwood, Bedfordshire on 18 March 1784 with whom he had a daughter, Sarah. His estates, including that of Gaddesden Place, were inherited by Sarah, who had married Joseph Thompson Whately, later the MP for St Albans. Whately thereupon adopted the name and arms of Halsey.

Parliament of Great Britain
Preceded by Thomas Plumer Byde; Jacob Houblon	Member of Parliament for Hertfordshire; 1768–1784; With: William Plumer	Succeeded by William Plumer; The Viscount Grimston
