= Sebright baronets =

Title in the Baronetage of England

Escutcheon of the Sebright baronets of Besford

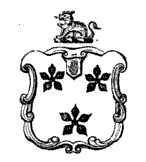
Arms of Sebright: Argent, three cinquefoils sable. Crest: A (heraldic) tiger sejant argent maned and crowned or. Motto: Servare Mentem, "To preserve equanimity"

The Sebright Baronetcy, of Besford in the County of Worcester, is a title in the Baronetage of England. It was created on 20 December 1626 for Edward Sebright, High Sheriff of Worcestershire who later fought as a Royalist in the Civil War. He was the son of John Sebright of Blakeshall, Wolverley and was the heir of his uncle William Sebright (1541–1620) of Besford, who established by his will in 1620 the charity "Sebright's Endowed Schools", still surviving today and very richly endowed as "Sebright's Educational Foundation". The fourth Baronet sat as Member of Parliament for Hertfordshire. The sixth Baronet represented Bath in the House of Commons. The seventh Baronet was Member of Parliament for Hertfordshire and also became known as an agriculturalist. The family's fortunes ebbed by the end of the nineteenth century, with the ninth Baronet leaving only £5 at his death.

The current baronet, Rufus Hugo Giles Sebright, born 1978 in Nîmes, France, has not proved his claim to the title.

== Sebright baronets, of Besford (1626) ==
- Sir Edward Sebright, 1st Baronet (c. 1585–c. 1658)
- Sir Edward Sebright, 2nd Baronet (c. 1645–1679)
- Sir Edward Sebright, 3rd Baronet (1668–1702)
- Sir Thomas Saunders Sebright, 4th Baronet (1692–1736)
- Sir Thomas Saunders Sebright, 5th Baronet (1723–1761)
- Sir John Saunders Sebright, 6th Baronet (1725–1794)
- Sir John Saunders Sebright, 7th Baronet (1767–1846)
- Sir Thomas Gage Saunders Sebright, 8th Baronet (1802–1864)
- Sir John Gage Saunders Sebright, 9th Baronet (1843–1890)
- Sir Egbert Cecil Saunders Sebright, 10th Baronet (1871–1897)
- Sir Edgar Reginald Saunders Sebright, 11th Baronet (1854–1917)
- Sir Guy Thomas Saunders Sebright, 12th Baronet (1856–1933)
- Sir Giles Edward Sebright, 13th Baronet (1896–1954)
- Sir Hugo Giles Edmund Sebright, 14th Baronet (1931–1985)
- Sir Peter Giles Vivian Sebright, 15th Baronet (1953–2003)
- Sir Rufus Hugo Giles Sebright, 16th Baronet (born 1978)

The Official Roll as of 2026 marks the title as dormant. Debrett's in 2019 gave no heir to the title.

== See also ==
- Wolverley

== Notes ==
Baronetage of England
Preceded by Harpur baronets	Sebright baronets of Besford; 20 December 1626	Succeeded by Beaumont baronets
