= Bilton Hall, North Yorkshire =

Coordinates: 54°00′41″N 1°29′28″W

Bilton Hall
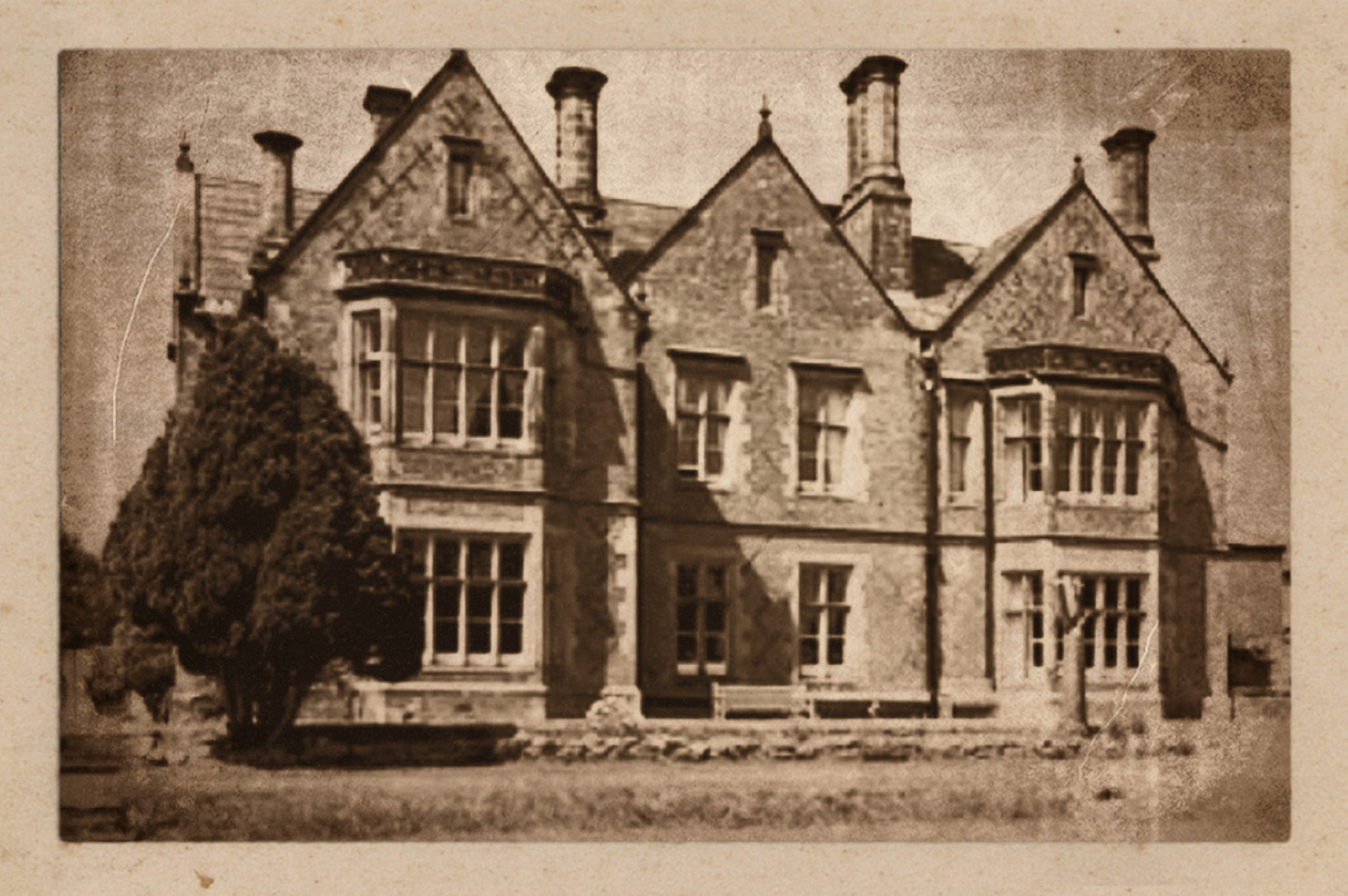
- Interactive map of the Bilton Hall area
- Former names: Bilton Park

General information
- Status: Grade II Listed
- Architectural style: Tudor-Jacobean
- Location: Bilton Hall Drive, Harrogate, North Yorkshire, HG1 4DW
- Owner: Slingsby Family (formerly) Stockdale Family (formerly) Watson Family (formerly)

Bilton Hall is a Grade II listed large country house near Harrogate, North Yorkshire. It was historically the home of the prominent Stockdale family, of which three Knaresborough MPs were members.

== History and ownership ==
There has been a building on the site of Bilton Hall since the 14th Century. The first structure sat within a newly created park to form a hunting lodge for the Slingsby family. Perhaps the best known member of the family was William Slingsby, who is credited as the discoverer of the first spa water well in Harrogate.

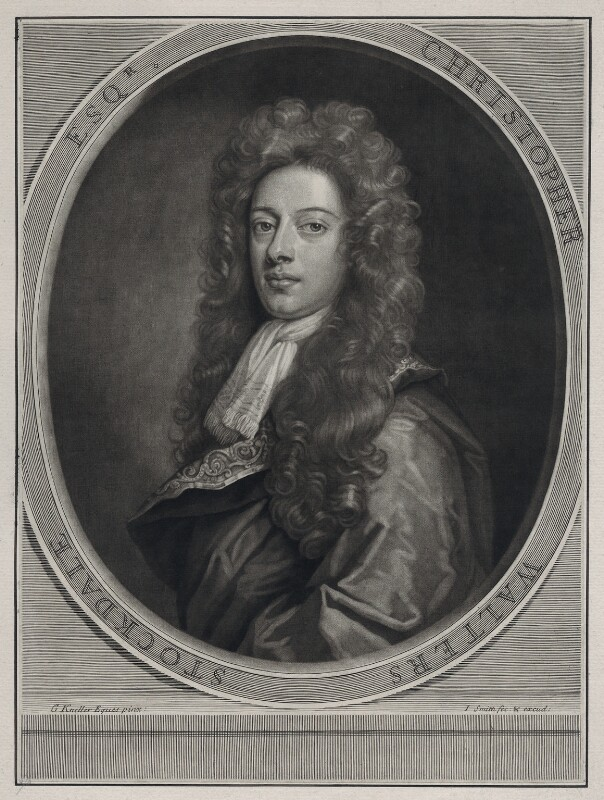
Christopher Stockdale of Bilton Hall

In 1631 it was acquired by Thomas Stockdale, son of William Stockdale of Green Hammerton, whose family had been significant Yorkshire landowners since the reign of Henry VI. Thomas Stockdale went on to represent Knaresborough in Parliament from 1645 until 1653. His son, William Stockdale took his fathers seat in Parliament, serving as member for Knaresborough from 1660 until his death in 1693. The Bilton estate then passed to his nephew Christopher Stockdale, who in turn became MP for Knaresborough in April 1693 holding the seat until his own death 1713. Christopher's heir, William Stockdale, inherited Bilton Hall upon his fathers demise. Like many hundreds in the country at the time, William had over-invested in the notorious South Sea Company and lost a great fortune when the shares crashed in 1721. The earliest of the surviving elements of the current structure date back to the Stockdale period of ownership.

In 1742 Bilton was acquired from the Stockdale family by John Watson of Malton. The Watsons carried out a program of refurbishment on the hall and constructed the present stable and coach house.

== See also ==
- Listed buildings in Knaresborough
