= William Plumer (1736–1822) =

British politician

William Plumer (1736–1822) was a British politician who served 54 years in the House of Commons between 1763 and 1822.

== Life ==
Plumer was the son of William Plumer and his wife Elizabeth Byde, daughter of Thomas Byde of Ware Park, and was born on 24 May 1736. He was admitted at Pembroke College, Cambridge in 1752.

Plumer was returned unopposed as Member of Parliament for Lewes at a by-election in February 1763. The Duke of Newcastle had supported his stand at Lewes because he was considered a strong candidate, and wished him to stand there at the following election. However, Plumer wanted to stand at his home seat at Hertfordshire. He succeeded his father to Blakesware and Gilston Park, Hertfordshire on 12 December 1767 and the Duke eventually agreed to release him from a commitment to stand at Lewes.

Plumer was popular in Hertfordshire; his position there was strong and he was returned for Hertfordshire without opposition at the 1768 general election. There were contested elections in 1774 and 1784, and each time he headed the poll by a large majority. In 1780 he was again returned unopposed.

The English Chronicle wrote in 1781:

William Plumer is one of the most opulent country gentlemen in the kingdom. Beside possessing the most extensive property of any gentleman in this county, his additional estates in Essex, Middlesex, and Suffolk, make up a clear income of fifteen thousand pounds per annum ... In his parliamentary character he has been uniform in his opposition to all the measures of the present Administration; and though no speaker, is one of the most constant attendants upon his legislative duty, and suffers no question to pass without that substantial indication of his political talents, a direct negative to the minister. His activity out of the House is not less conspicuous than his honest zeal within it ... His character, as a private individual, is of that kind that totally exempts him from the smallest imputation of being under the direction of any improper motive in the enthusiasm of his public exertions. His fortune raises him above the influence of pecuniary temptation, and the pitiful ambition of titular importance constitutes no part of his foibles. Having little to wish, therefore, and nothing to fear, he is governed by no consideration but his own conviction, and without any pretensions to the estimation of one of the first politicians in the kingdom is, beyond, all doubt, one of the sincerest.

Plumer headed the poll again in the 1790 general election. He topped the poll again in the 1796 and 1802 general elections and was returned unopposed in 1806. However he was in poor health and retired at the 1807 general election on a plea of ‘advancing age’. Then he missed his participation in Parliament and at the age of 76, he accepted the seat of Higham Ferrers from his friend Earl Fitzwilliam and was returned in the 1812 general election. By 1815 he was deaf and suffering from rheumatism and gout, and it was said he never stayed in the House after six o'clock. He was too ill to attend early in 1816 and considered retiring but went to Higham Ferrers for his re-election in the 1818 general election.

Plumer died on 15 January 1822, without issue.

== Family ==
Plumer married as his first wife Frances Dorothy Carey daughter of Lucius Cary, 7th Viscount Falkland on 12 July 1760. She died in December 1761.

He remarried to Jane Hamilton, daughter of Hon. and Rev. George Hamilton on 9 August 1791. After his death, she married, as her third husband, Robert Ward, MP, who adopted the name Plumer and moved into Gilston Park.

Parliament of Great Britain
Preceded by Thomas Sergison; Sir Francis Poole	Member of Parliament for Lewes; 1763–1768; With: Thomas Sergison; Lord Edward Bentinck	Succeeded by Thomas Hampden; Thomas Hay
Preceded by Thomas Plumer Byde; Jacob Houblon	Member of Parliament for Hertfordshire; 1768–1807; With: Thomas Halsey 1768-1784; The Viscount Grimston 1784-1790; William Baker 1790-1802; Hon. Peniston Lamb 1802 -1805; William Baker 1805-1807	Succeeded by Hon. Thomas Brand; Sir John Sebright, Bt
Parliament of the United Kingdom
Preceded by Viscount Duncannon	Member of Parliament for Higham Ferrers; 1812–1822	Succeeded by Viscount Normanby
