= Charles Caesar (Treasurer of the Navy) =

British Member of Parliament, lawyer, Tory and Jacobite

Charles Caesar (21 November 1673 – 2 April 1741) of Benington, Hertfordshire was a British Member of Parliament, a lawyer, a Tory and a Jacobite.

== Early life ==
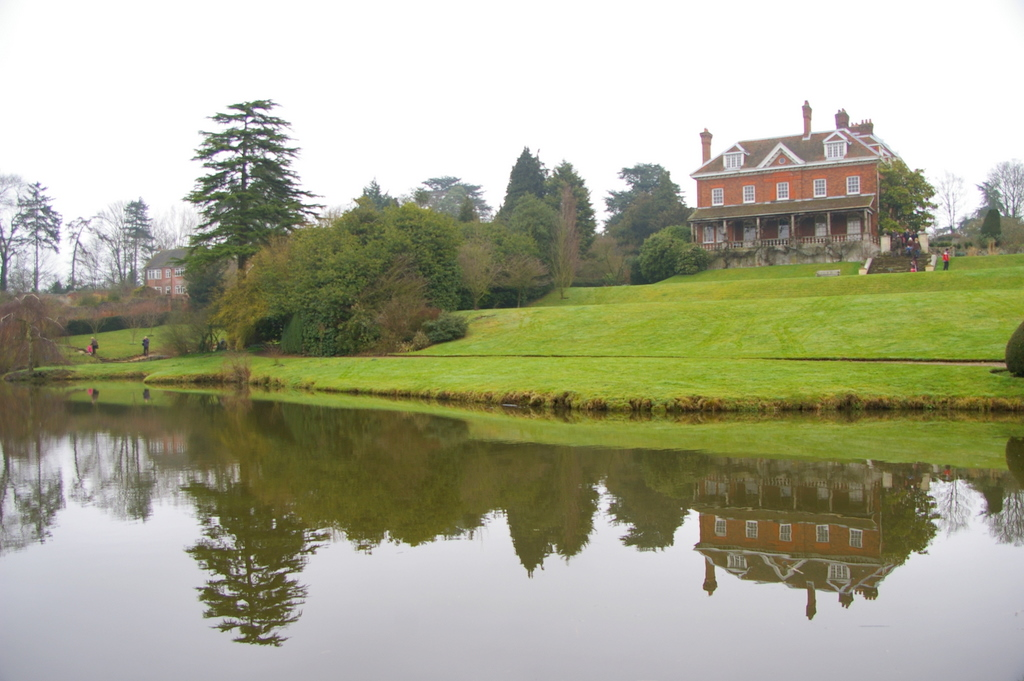
Benington Lordship

Charles Caesar was the son of Sir Charles Caesar of Benington. He was educated at St Catharine's College, Cambridge and admitted at the Middle Temple in 1690. He succeeded his father to the Benington estate in 1694.

== Political career ==
He entered Parliament in 1701 as member for Hertford. This was a borough where his family had considerable influence, but where there was an ongoing dispute over the franchise (the main bone of contention being whether non-resident freemen of the town were entitled to vote). Almost every election ended in a petition to the House of Commons against the result, and the usual outcome was that the cases were decided for partisan reasons rather than on the merits of the case. In 1708, Caesar was defeated at the general election by one Sir Thomas Clarke, and petitioned against the result, though he withdrew his petition before any decision had been reached.

He regained his seat in 1710, and served as Treasurer of the Navy in the Earl of Oxford's administration from 1711 to 1714, being turned out of office on the Hanoverian succession. At the general election of 1715 the Whigs secured a majority and although Caesar was re-elected for Hertford, his opponents (Clarke again being one) petitioned against him, alleging bribery and other illegal practices, and the result was overturned. Though temporarily out of Parliament, Caesar remained active in Tory politics and was a close associate of Oxford, being an intermediary in his attempt to enlist the support of Charles XII of Sweden for the Jacobite cause.

At the next election, in 1722, Caesar again saw his election overturned, sitting for only a few months before the committee deemed him not to have duly elected, and seated Sir Thomas Clarke once more. However, after this setback Caesar stood instead for the county at the following election, and sat as Hertfordshire's MP for most of the rest of his life.

== Private life ==
He died in 1741 in financial difficulties, having built a new house at Benington which burnt down within a short time. He had married, in 1702, Mary, the daughter of Ralph Freman of Aspenden Hall, Hertfordshire and had 2 sons and 2 daughters. The Benington estate was sold by trustees to Sir John Chesshyre in 1744 and the bulk of the remaining monies given to the eldest son Charles to reestablish a family seat.

Political offices
Preceded by Robert Walpole	Treasurer of the Navy; 1711–1714	Succeeded by John Aislabie
Parliament of England
Preceded by William Cowper; Sir William Cowper	Member of Parliament for Hertford; 1701–1707; With: Thomas Filmer; Richard Goulston 1701–1705; Sir Thomas Clarke 1705–1707	Succeeded by Parliament of Great Britain
Parliament of Great Britain
Preceded by Parliament of England	Member of Parliament for Hertford; 1707–1708; With: Sir Thomas Clarke	Succeeded by Sir Thomas Clarke; William Monson
Preceded by Sir Thomas Clarke; William Monson	Member of Parliament for Hertford; 1710–1715; With: Richard Goulston	Succeeded by Sir Thomas Clarke; John Boteler
Preceded by Sir Thomas Clarke; John Boteler	Member of Parliament for Hertford; 1722–1723; With: Edward Harrison	Succeeded by Edward Harrison; Sir Thomas Clarke
Preceded by Sir Thomas Saunders Sebright; Ralph Freman	Member of Parliament for Hertfordshire; 1727–1734; With: Sir Thomas Saunders Sebright	Succeeded by Sir Thomas Saunders Sebright; William Plumer
Preceded by Sir Thomas Saunders Sebright; William Plumer	Member of Parliament for Hertfordshire; 1736–1741; With: William Plumer	Succeeded by Jacob Houblon; Charles Gore
