= Thomas Legh (politician, born 1675) =

English politician (1675–1717)

Thomas Legh (13 June 1675 – 1717) was an English politician. He sat as MP for Newton from December 1701 till 1713.

He was the second son of Richard Legh and Elizabeth, the daughter of Sir Thomas Chicheley. He was the brother of Peter Legh. He was educated at Merton College, Oxford in 1693. On 26 January 1701, he married Henrietta Maria, the daughter and heiress of Thomas Fleetwood and they had five sons (one predeceased him), five daughters (three predeceased him) and three other children who all predeceased him.
