= Charles Zedenno Stanley =

English politician (1666–1715)

Charles Zedenno Stanley (8 December 1666 – 9 April 1715) was an English politician. He sat as MP for Preston from 1702 till 1705, Lancashire from 1705 till 1713 and Clitheroe from 1713 till 14 April 1714.

He was the ninth son of Charles Stanley, 8th Earl of Derby and Dorothea Helena, the daughter of Jan van der Kerchhove. He was the brother of James Stanley, 10th Earl of Derby.

== Parliamentary career ==
Stanley first stood for Liverpool in 1695 but was unsuccessful. In the second election of 1701, he stood for Preston and was defeated. He was elected in the 1702 election. In 1705 after a fierce contest he was returned for Lancashire. In 1708, he was returned unopposed for Lancashire. In 1710, he was re-elected to Lancashire and voted for the impeachement of Dr. Henry Sacheverell. In 1713, he withdrew from the Lancashire election due to Tory opposition and stood for Clitheroe. On 14 April 1714, his election to Clitheroe was declared void. He sought support from Peter Legh but failed. He failed to secure a seat in the 1715 election and died on 9 April 1715. On 16 April 1715, he was buried at Ormskirk.
