= Ralph Freman (1627–1714) =

English politician

Ralph Freman (1627–1714), of Aspenden, Hertfordshire, was an English politician who sat in the House of Commons between 1685 and 1695.

Freman was baptized on 29 May 1627, the eldest son of Ralph Freman of Aspenden and his wife Mary Hewett, daughter of Sir William Hewett of Pishiobury, Sawbridgeworth. He was educated privately under Seth Ward. He married Elizabeth Aubrey, daughter of Sir John Aubrey, 1st Baronet of Llantrithyd, Glamorganshire on 10 February 1662. He succeeded his father in 1665. Offices Held

in October 1660, Freman was appointed Commissioner for sewers for Essex. He was appointed Commissioner for assessment for Hertfordshire in 1661 and held the post until 1680. In 1663 he became a JP for Hertfordshire. In 1681 he was appointed Deputy Lieutenant for Hertfordshire. He was returned unopposed as Member of Parliament (MP) for Hertfordshire in 1685. In 1687 he lost his position as Deputy Lieutenant and his seat on the commission of the peace. However he was restored to these positions in 1689 and also became Commissioner for Assessment again. He was elected Member of Parliament for Hertfordshire at the 1690 general election and though he was not invited to stand in 1695, he was a candidate, but unsuccessful.

After leaving Parliament Freman continued in politics supporting the Tories locally. He made improvements to his house at Aspenden, casing the house with brick and beautifying the gardens. He may have built up an extensive library, mainly of devotional works. He encouraged Bonnell to translate Erasmus’ paraphrases into English. He was treated by Dr Sloane for loss of appetite and swollen legs but died on 17 November 1714. He and his wife had three sons and seven daughters. His eldest son Ralph, who became an MP, inherited Aspenden and erected a monument to his parents describing them as having been ‘amiable and delightful’. His daughter Mary married Charles Caesar.
