= Charles Gore (MP) =

British landowner and Tory politician

Charles Gore (c. 1711 - 15 February 1768) of Tring Park, Hertfordshire, was a British landowner and Tory politician who sat in the House of Commons almost continuously between 1739 and 1768.

== Early life ==
Gore was the eldest son of William Gore and his wife Lady Mary Compton, daughter of George Compton, 4th Earl of Northampton. He matriculated at Christ Church, Oxford on 12 July 1729, aged 18. In 1739 he succeeded to Tring Park on the death of his father. He was responsible for diverting the main Aylesbury to Berkhamsted road from a course through the park, which took it straight past the front door of Tring Park Mansion, to its present route following considerably flatter terrain further north. He married Ellen Humfreys, daughter of Sir William Humfreys, 1st Baronet, of London, on 3 December 1741.

== Career ==
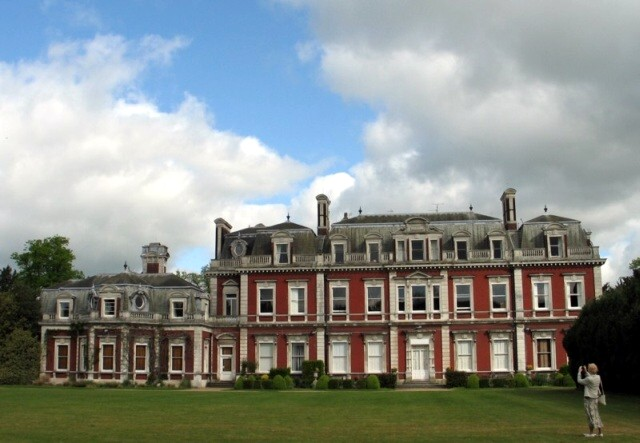
Tring Park Mansion (southern face)

Gore was returned as Tory Member of Parliament for Cricklade at a by-election on 21 November 1739 caused by the death of his father. He voted against the motion for Walpole's removal in February 1741. At the 1741 British general election there was a double return at Cricklade and he withdrew there as he had also been returned unopposed as MP for Hertfordshire. In 1742 he was one of the opposition Members proposed by the court to sit on the committee of inquiry into Walpole's Administration, although he was not elected to it. He continued to vote with the Opposition until the end of 1744 when he went over to the Administration with his uncle Thomas Gore. He was returned unopposed again in 1747.

At the 1754 British general election, Gore was returned for Hertfordshire after a contest. There was another contest at the 1761 British general election, and as he had lost the support of the Dissenters, he was defeated. In May 1762 Newcastle recommended Gore to Nathaniel Ryder for a seat at Tiverton, where he was returned at a by-election on 14 May 1762. Gore was in poor health and spent the winter of 1764 to 1765 in France, returning to England in May 1765. By this time his appearance in divisions was sporadic and his political inclinations unclear. He is not known ever to have spoken in the House.

== Death and legacy ==
Gore died on 15 February 1768 leaving three sons and five daughters. He was the brother of Lieutenant-Colonel John Gore.

Parliament of Great Britain
Preceded by Sir Thomas Reade; William Gore	Member of Parliament for Cricklade; 1739–1741; With: Sir Thomas Reade	Succeeded by Sir Thomas Reade; Welbore Ellis
Preceded by William Plumer; Charles Caesar	Member of Parliament for Hertfordshire; 1741–1761; With: Jacob Houblon 1741-1747; Paggen Hale 1747-1755; William Plumer 1755-1761	Succeeded by Thomas Plumer Byde; Jacob Houblon
Preceded by Nathaniel Ryder; Sir Edward Hussey-Montagu	Member of Parliament for Tiverton; 1762–1768; With: Nathaniel Ryder	Succeeded by Nathaniel Ryder; Sir John Duntze, Bt
