= Walter White (1667–1705) =

English politician

Walter White (13 August 1667 – 21 July 1705) was an English Whig politician who sat as MP for Chippenham from 1695 till 1702 and from 11 May till his death on 21 July 1705.

He was the first son of Walter White and Priscilla (née Eyles). He came from a Puritan family.

== Parliamentary career ==
Walter White was first elected to Chippenham in 1695, he supported key government measures such as the Security of King and Government Act 1695, and supported the attainder of Sir John Fenwick, 3rd Baronet in the aftermath of the 1696 assassination plot against William III.

He was re-elected unopposed in 1698. He stood down in 1702 in favour of James Montagu. He returned to parliament on 11 May 1705 but died on 21 July 1705.
