= Cherub Playing a Lute =

Painting by Rosso Fiorentino

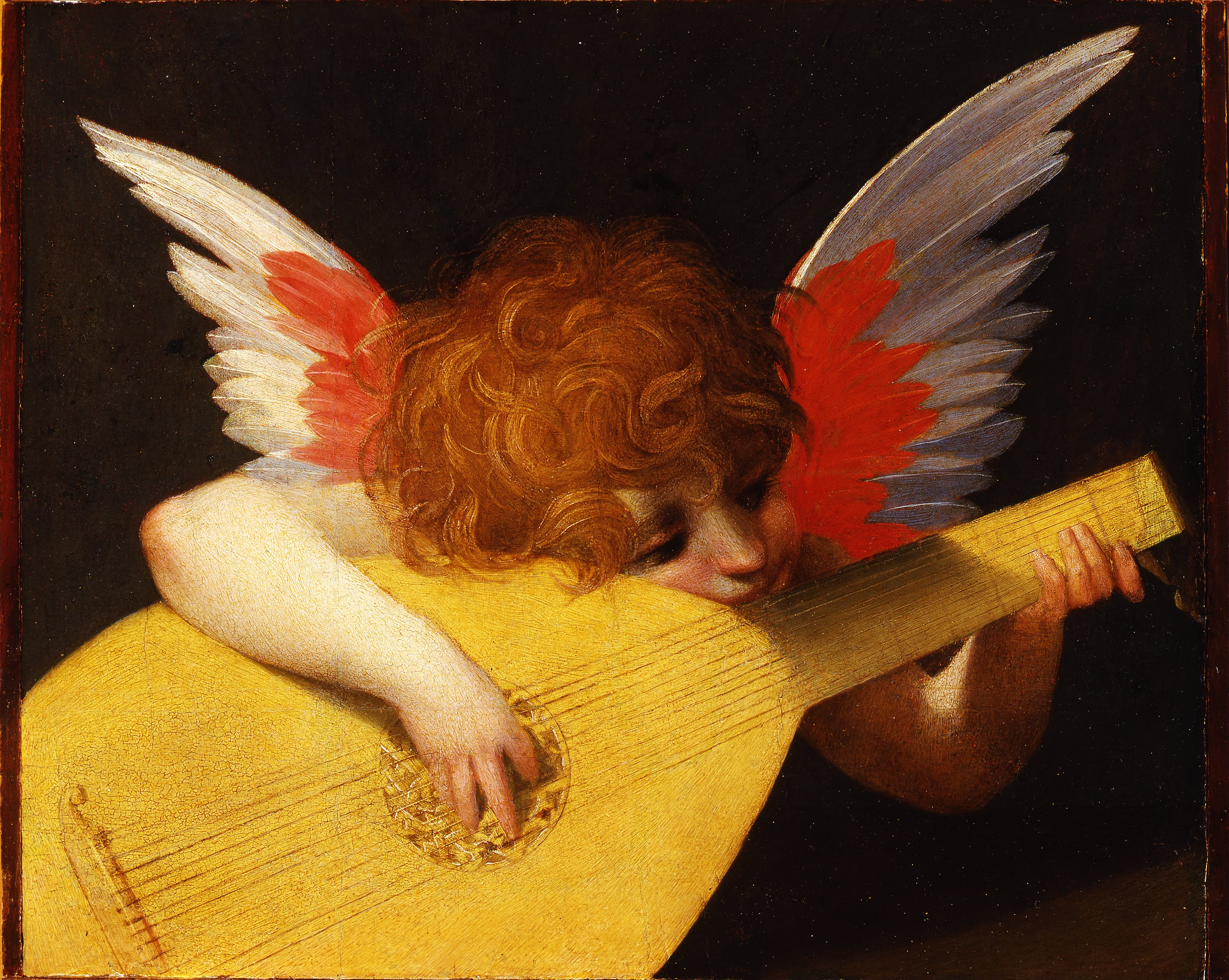
Cherub Playing a Lute (1521) by Rosso Fiorentino

Cherub Playing a Lute or Musical Cherub is a 1521 oil on panel painting by Rosso Fiorentino, now in the Uffizi in Florence. It is signed "Rubeus Florentinus" and dated - though the date is unclear it probably reads 1521.

It entered the Tribuna of the Uffizi on 29 June 1605, at which date it had its present attribution. The 1635–1638, 1704 and 1853 inventories altered this to Beccafumi and the 1784 inventory to Francesco Vanni before an 1825 inventory restored the present attribution.

== Bibliography (in Italian) ==
- Antonio Natali, Rosso Fiorentino, Silvana Editore, Milano, 2006, ISBN 88-366-0631-8
- Elisabetta Marchetti Letta, Pontormo, Rosso Fiorentino, Scala, Firenze, 1994, ISBN 88-8117-028-0
- Gloria Fossi, Uffizi, Giunti, Firenze, 2004, ISBN 88-09-03675-1
