= John Wilkins (1661–1726) =

English politician (1661–1726)

John Wilkins (1661 – 19 February 1726) was an English Tory politician. He sat as MP for Leicestershire from 1698 till November 1701 and 1702 till 1708.

He was baptised on 13 May 1661. He was the son of William Wilkins (died 1668) and Katherine Bowyer. In 1688, he married Rebecca (died 1718), the daughter of William Wollaston. They had one son who predeceased him.
