= Christopher Walters Stockdale =

English Member of Parliament (c1665–1713)

Christopher Stockdale
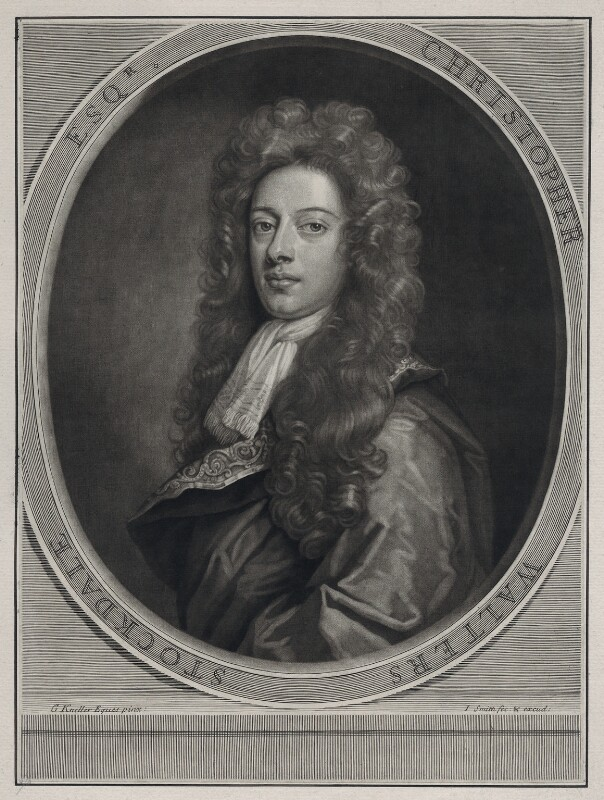
- Born: Christopher Walters
- Known for: Parliamentarian and Landowner
- Spouse: Elizabeth Stockdale (née Liddell)

Christopher Walters Stockdale (1665–1713) was an English politician and landowner in Yorkshire who served as Member of Parliament for Knaresborough from 1693 until his death in 1713.

== Life ==
He was born Christopher Walters in 1665, the second son of Robert Walters of Cundall Manor (now an independent boarding school). His uncle was William Stockdale, a distinguished Whig parliamentarian who had held his Knaresborough seat for 33 years without interruption. As a condition of inheriting his uncle's substantial estate and political interests he changed his surname to Stockdale by royal license in 1693. This estate included Bilton Hall near Harrogate. In the same year he was elected as Member of Parliament for Knaresborough.

Christopher Stockdale married Elizabeth, daughter of Sir Thomas Liddell, 2nd Baronet of Ravensworth Castle. They had one son named William Stockdale.
