= William Jennens (died 1709) =

English politician

William Jennens (c. 1666 – 6 February 1709) was an English Tory politician who sat as MP for Wallingford from 21 February 1689 till 1698 and January 1701 till 6 February 1709.

He was the third but eldest surviving son of Richard Jennens and his wife, Elizabeth. On 15 June 1696, he married Mary Spencer and they had two sons and one daughter.

== Parliamentary career ==
Politically, Jennens was a committed Tory. He was first elected in 1689 and generally opposed Court policies. He refused the Association of 1696, following the attempted assassination of William III. He lost his seat in 1698 but returned in 1701 acting as a teller in key votes. He was likely inactive due to illness near the end of his career. He died on 6 February 1709.
