= Edward Harvey (1658–1736) =

English politician (1658–1736)

Edward Harvey (30 March 1658 – 24 October 1736) was an English Tory politician. He sat as MP for Bletchingley from March till July 1679 and Clitheroe from 1705 till 1713 and 30 March 1715 till 1722.

He was the first son of Sir Daniel Harvey and the brother of Daniel Harvey. On 8 May 1679, he married his cousin Elizabeth (died 1696), the daughter of Sir Eliab Harvey and they had three sons (including Michael Harvey) and eight daughters. In July 1702, he married Lady Elizabeth (died 1724), the daughter of Francis Newport, 1st Earl of Bradford and widow of Sir Henry Lyttelton, 2nd Baronet. On 6 July 1725, he married Mary, the daughter of Edward Carteret.

In 1679, he sat in Parliament as an Exclusionist. In 1695 and 1698, he stood for Surrey but was unsuccessful in both elections. In 1705, he returned to Parliament as MP for Clitheroe on the influence of his Whig uncle, Ralph Montagu, 1st Duke of Montagu where he was classed as a Tory and ardent Jacobite (despite his earlier Exclusionist stance). In 1708, he was re-elected for Clitheroe. In 1710, he voted against the impeachement of Dr. Henry Sacheverell. In 1713, he was defeated at Clitheroe. In 1715, he regained his seat for Clitheroe.

He was arrested for his treasonable correspondence with the French ambassador in London in 1716 and allegedly attempted suicide in prison. In 1717, he contributed financially to the Swedish Plot. In 1722, he left the House of Commons. By 1733, he moved to France and died at Dunkirk on 24 October 1736.
