= William Farrer (died 1737) =

MP for Bedford

William Farrer (circa. 1656 – 12 April 1737) was an English politician who served as MP for Bedford from 1695 till 1698, 1701 till 1702, 1705 till 1713 and 1715 till 1727.

He was the son of Thomas Farrer and Helen, the daughter of Sir William Boteler. He married Mary (nee Boteler) and had one son and three daughters.
