= John Spark (died 1707) =

English politician

John Spark (c. 1673 – 2 January 1707) was an English Tory politician who sat as MP for Newport from December 1701 till his death in 1707.

He was the son of John Spark and Duglas, the daughter of John Eliot. He was admitted into Queens' College, Cambridge on 20 November 1689 at the age of 16. He married Diana, the daughter of John Rolle on 17 September 1706 with £12,000.
