= Ralph Freman (1666–1742) =

English politician

Ralph Freman (1666–1742), of Aspenden Hall and Hamels, Hertfordshire, was an English politician who sat in the English and British House of Commons for 30 years from 1697 to 1727.

Freman was the eldest son of Ralph Freman, MP of Aspenden and his wife Elizabeth Aubrey (died 1720), daughter of Sir John Aubrey, 1st Baronet of Llantrithyd, Glamorgan. He was educated privately under the pious James Bonnell and Daniel Duckfield, and travelled abroad in Holland, France and Italy from about 1678 to 1684. He married Elizabeth Catesby, the daughter and coheiress of Thomas Catesby of Ecton, Northamptonshire with £4,000, under a settlement dated 17 February 1700.

Freman was elected Member of Parliament (MP) for Hertfordshire at a contested by-election on 30 December 1697 and again at the general election of 1698. He was very active politically, tightening his grip on his own constituency, and speaking and participating in parliamentary business in the House. His particular speciality was in dealing with electoral disputes. He was returned unopposed at the two general elections of 1701 and in 1702 and won contests at the general elections of 1705 and 1708. He was returned unopposed at the 1710 general election and chaired the Committee of privileges and elections from 1710 to 1713. He was returned unopposed at the 1713 general election. In 1714 he succeeded his father.

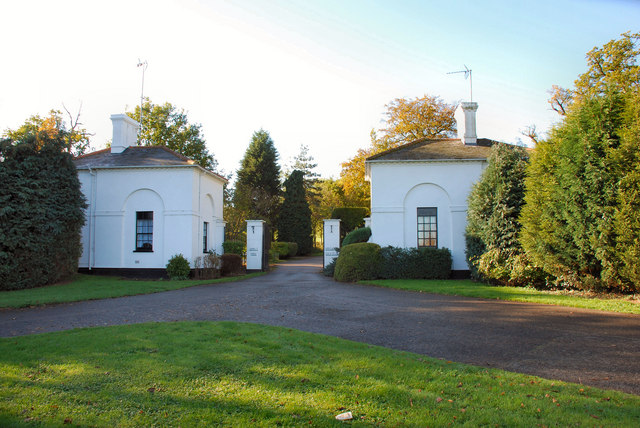
Hamels Park entrance

Freman was re-elected MP in a contest at Hertfordshire at the 1715 general election. He was a Tory who supported the Hanoverian succession, and was said to have refused the offer of a seat on the Admiralty Board. He was re-elected at the 1722 general election, but defeated by his brother-in-law Charles Caesar at the 1727 general election. He subsequently colluded with the Whigs in promoting William Plumer to defeat Caesar at the following election.

Freman commissioned the building of Hamels mansion in Braughing, Hertfordshire in 1713. He died on 8 June 1742, aged 76 leaving three sons.

Parliament of England
Preceded by Sir Thomas Blount; Thomas Halsey	Member of Parliament for Hertfordshire; 1697–1708; With: Thomas Halsey; Sir John Spencer, Bt	Succeeded by Parliament of Great Britain
Parliament of Great Britain
Preceded by Parliament of England	Member of Parliament for Hertfordshire; 1708–1727; With: Thomas Halsey; Sir Thomas Sebright, Bt	Succeeded by Charles Caesar; Sir Thomas Sebright, Bt
