= John Harris (died 1714) =

English politician (died 1714)

John Harris (c. 1675 – 1714) was an English Whig politician and merchant. He sat as MP for Exeter from 13 April 1708 till 1710.

He may have stood in the 1705 election and was successful against the Tory nominee in the by-election on 13 April 1708. He voted in 1709 for the naturalization of the Palatines and the following year for the impeachement of Dr Henry Sacheverell.
