= Thomas Mansel (1678–1706) =

Welsh politician (1678–1709)

Thomas Mansel (4 May 1678 – 7 January 1706) was a Welsh politician who sat as MP for Glamorgan from 20 December 1699 to November 1701 and Cardiff Boroughs from December 1701 till his death on 7 January 1706.
