= Sir Thomas Sebright, 4th Baronet =

British landowner and politician (1692–1736)

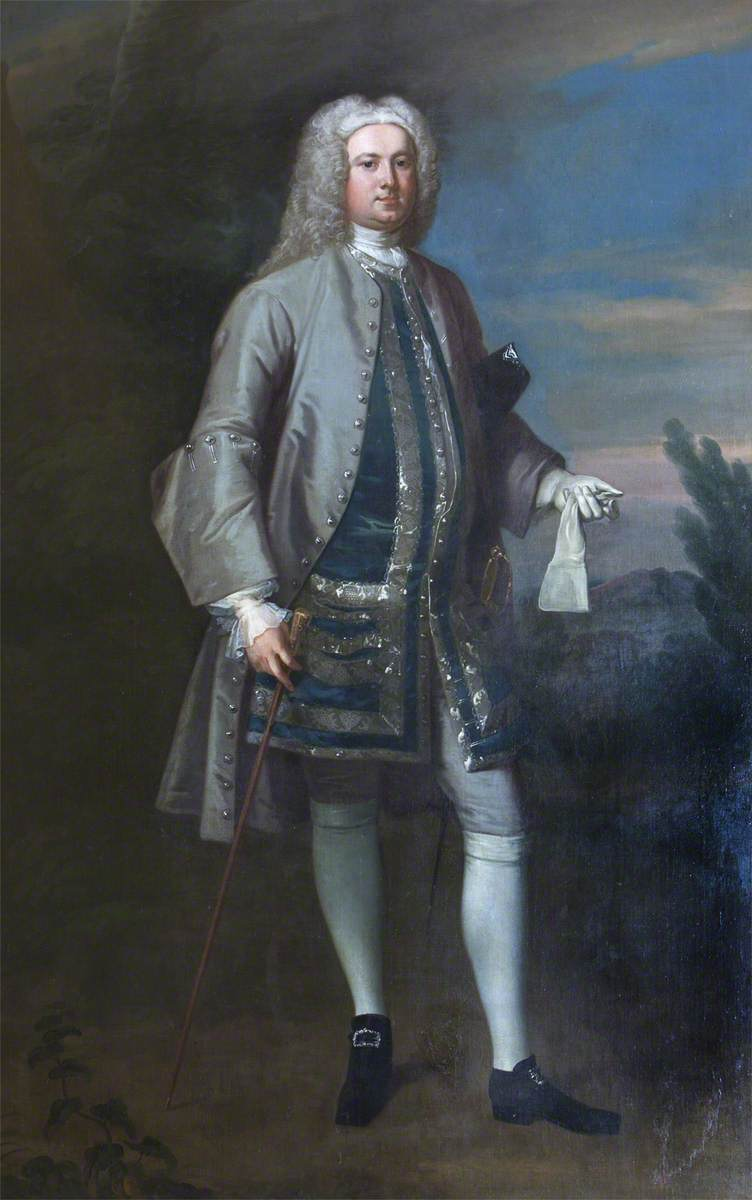
A portrait of Thomas

Sir Thomas Sebright, 4th Baronet (1692–1736) of Beechwood Park was an English landowner and politician who sat in the House of Commons from 1715 to 1736. Sebright was born on 11 May 1692, the eldest son of Sir Edward Sebright, 3rd Baronet of Besford, Worcestershire and his wife Anne Saunders, daughter and coheiress of Thomas Saunders of Beechwood, Hertfordshire. He succeeded his father in the baronetcy on 15 December 1702. He matriculated at Jesus College, Oxford on 3 June 1705

In November 1718, he married Henrietta Dashwood, daughter of Sir Samuel Dashwood, MP and Lord Mayor of London. Sebright had inherited from his mother the Beechwood estate in Hertfordshire. He was elected Member of Parliament for Hertfordshire at the 1715 general election. He was re-elected at the succeeding elections of 1722, 1727 and 1734. Sebright died on 12 April 1736. He was a notable book collector. He left two sons, of whom Thomas inherited the baronetcy.

Parliament of Great Britain
Preceded by Ralph Freman, junior Thomas Halsey	Member of Parliament for Hertfordshire; 1715–1736; With: Ralph Freman, junior 1715-1722; Charles Caesar 1727-1734; William Plumer 1734-1736	Succeeded by William Plumer; Charles Caesar
Baronetage of England
Preceded by Edward Sebright	Baronet (of Besford); 1702-1736	Succeeded by Thomas Saunders Sebright
