= Francis Arundell (1676–1712) =

English politician (1676–1712)

Francis Arundell (1676 – November 1712) was an English politician. He sat as MP for Northampton from 2 November 1704 till 1710.

He was baptised on 3 May 1676. He was the first son of Francis Arundell (died 1736) and Felicia (died 1710), the daughter of William Wilmer. He was educated at Stoke Bruern School and matriculated at Trinity College, Cambridge in 1693. His marriage to Isabella (died 1724), the fourth daughter of Sir William Wentworth was licensed on 1 July 1703. They had one son and two daughters (one predeceased him).
