= Jacob Houblon =

British landowner and Tory politician

Jacob Houblon (31 July 1710 – 1770), of Hallingbury, Essex, was a British landowner and Tory politician who sat in the House of Commons between 1735 and 1768.

Houblon was the only surviving son of Charles Houblon, Portugal merchant, of Bubbingworth Hall, Essex and his wife Mary Bate, daughter of Daniel Bate, London merchant, of Barton Court, Abingdon, Berkshire. The Houblons came from Flanders as Protestant refugees in Queen Elizabeth's time, and became significant London merchants. Houblon succeeded his father who died on 20 March 1711. He also succeeded his father's first cousin, Sir Richard Houblon, on 13 October 1724, who ordered that his personal estate should be laid out in the purchase of entailed lands. Houblon was admitted at Corpus Christi College, Cambridge in 1725 and migrated to Emmanuel on 9 February 1730. In 1729, the estate of Hallingbury on the Essex and Hertfordshire border, was bought for Houblon by Sir Richard Houblon's trustees. Houblon become a Tory squire and severed his family's Whig and city of London connections. He became connected with the extreme Tories by his marriage to Mary Hynde Cotton, daughter of Sir John Hynde Cotton, 3rd Baronet of Madingley Hall, Cambridgeshire on 31 July 1735.

Houblon was returned as Tory Member of Parliament for Colchester at a by-election on 20 March 1735. At the 1741 British general election he was returned as MP for Hertfordshire During his first 12 years in Parliament he regularly voted against the Government, except on the motion for Walpole's removal in 1741, when he was among the Tories who walked out. As a Tory, he joined the Cocoa Tree Club. He did not stand at the 1747 British general election.

Houblon was High Sheriff of Hertfordshire for the year 1757 to 1758. In 1761 he stood at Hertfordshire on a joint interest with Charles Gore, a Pelhamite and was returned without Gore. He remained an independent. He voted against the repeal of the Stamp Act, on 22 February 1766 and against the Chatham Government over the land tax, 27 February 1767. There is no record of his having spoken in the Parliament. He did not stand again at the 1768.

Houblon died on 15 February 1770, leaving three sons and two daughters.

Parliament of Great Britain
Preceded by Isaac Lemyng Rebow; Matthew Martin	Member of Parliament for Colchester; 1735–1741; With: Matthew Martin	Succeeded by John Olmius; Matthew Martin
Preceded by William Plumer I Charles Caesar	Member of Parliament for Hertfordshire; 1741–1747; With: Charles Gore	Succeeded by Paggen Hale; Charles Gore
Preceded by William Plumer I Charles Gore	Member of Parliament for Hertfordshire; 1761–1768; With: Thomas Plumer Byde	Succeeded by William Plumer II; Thomas Halsey
