= Edward Rigby (MP) =

English politician (died 1706)

Edward Rigby (c. 1653 – 2 May 1706) was an English Tory politician and lawyer. He sat as MP for Preston from February to November 1701 and 15 May 1705 till his death on 2 May 1706.

He was the second but first surviving son of Edward Rigby and his first wife Alice, the daughter of Sir Thomas Wilsford. He was educated at Preston School. He was admitted into Christ's College Cambridge on 21 April 1670 at the age of 16. He was educated at Gray's Inn in 1670 and called to the bar in 1678, became an Ancient in 1702 and sat as a bencher in 1706.
