= John Verney (died 1707) =

English politician (died 1707)

John Verney (c. 1652 – 31 October 1707) was an English Tory politician and lawyer. He sat as MP for Leicestershire from 1685 till 1687, 1695 till November 1701 and 1702 till his death on 31 October 1707.

He was the first son of Sir Richard Verney and his first wife Mary, the daughter of Sir John Pretyman, 1st Baronet. He was admitted into Jesus College, Cambridge on 4 July 1668, at the age of 16. He entered the Middle Temple in 1670, and was called to the bar in 1677. His marriage to Christina (died 1707), the daughter and heiress of John Breton was licensed on 13 July 1683. They had two sons who predeceased him.
