= William Plummer =

American cabinetmaker and inventor

William M. Plummer (1873–1943) was an African American cabinetmaker and inventor from Smyth County, Virginia. His decorative work is part of both the tradition of American decorative arts and of African American folk art.

== Early life and education ==
William M. Plummer, commonly known as "Bill", was born to Claiburn and Seenah Plummer of Marion, Virginia. In 1897 he married Magdalene Floyd and they moved to Jeffersonville, Virginia. Bill and Magdalene started a family in Jeffersonville while he worked as a sawmill engineer.

== Career ==
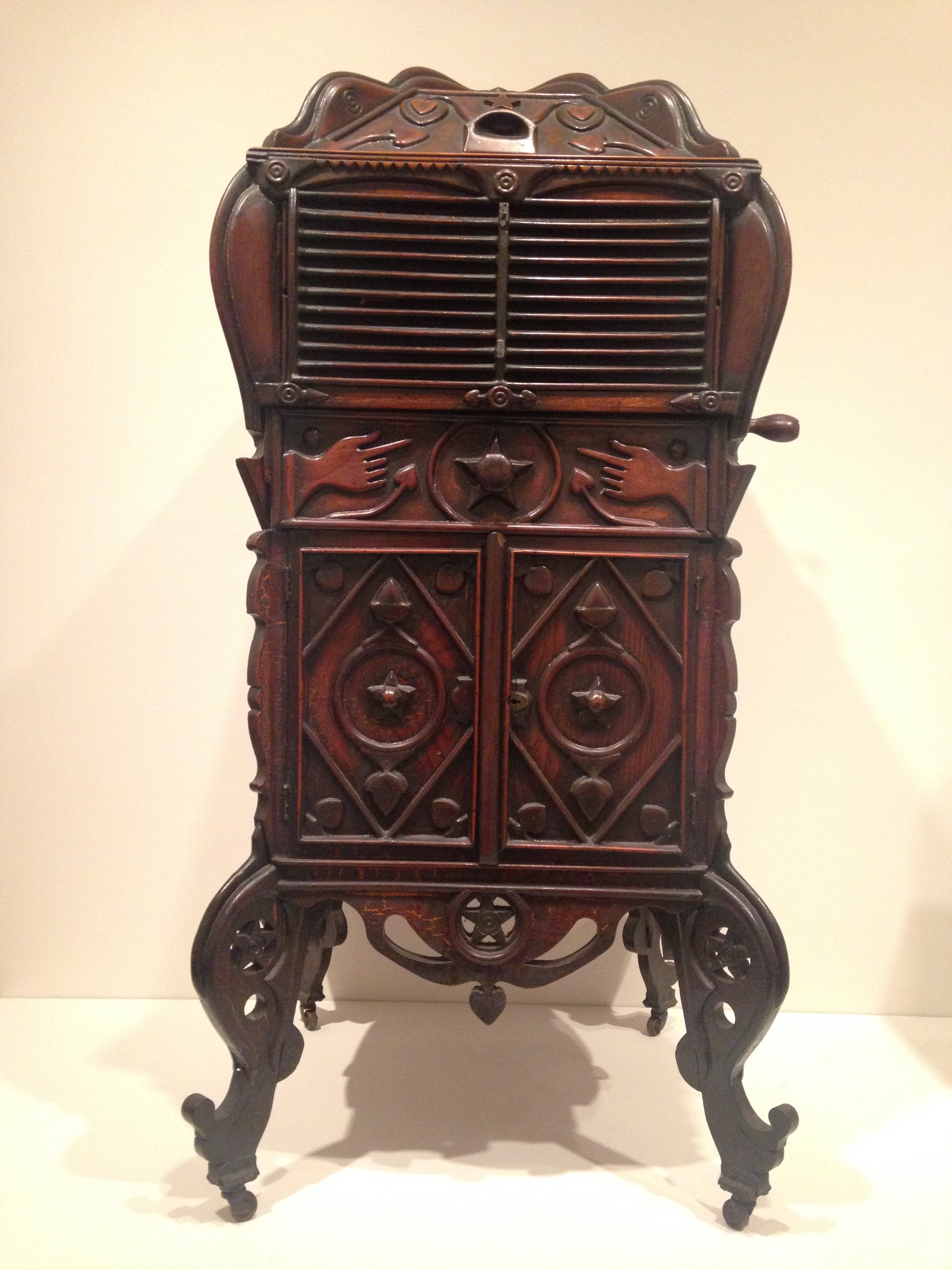
Victrola Cabinet, William Plummer, Philadelphia Museum of Art

Bill spent most of his life in Smyth County with his wife and family, where he worked as a machinist in the automobile industry. While working he also built bicycles, a motorcycle, an airplane, furniture, an elaborately decorated phonograph cabinet and a banjo decorated with stars.

The elaborate phonograph cabinet which he created is in the permanent collection of the Philadelphia Museum of Art. Made for personal use, it is estimated to contain more than 300 pieces of wood. The carvings combine emblems from Southern folk art such as hands, hearts, vines and stars, with stylized versions of the Victor Talking Machine's dog mascot Nipper. It was even mentioned in his obituary.
