= Thomas Stringer (1660–1706) =

English politician (1660–1706)

Thomas Stringer (9 November 1660 – 17 September 1706) was an English Whig politician and lawyer. He sat as MP for Clitheroe from 1698 till his death on 17 September 1706.

He was the second son of Sir Thomas Stringer and his second wife Rebecca, the daughter of William Nelson. He is the brother of William Stringer and was educated at Christ Church College, Oxford in 1675. He entered Gray's Inn in 1676 and was called to the bar in 1683. He became an Ancient of the Inn in 1688. He died unmarried.
