= Thomas Dodson =

English politician

Thomas Dodson (c. 1666 – 1707) was an English politician who sat as MP for Liskeard from December 1701 until his death in 1707.

He was the first surviving son of Thomas Dodsdon (died 1672) and Elizabeth, the daughter of William Sedley. He married Mary, the daughter of John Buller I on 16 May 1684 and had two sons and five daughters.

In January 1707, he had been seriously wounded in a duel with John Manley and later that year died of his wounds. He was buried on 24 August 1707.
