= William Plumer (died 1767) =

British lawyer and Whig

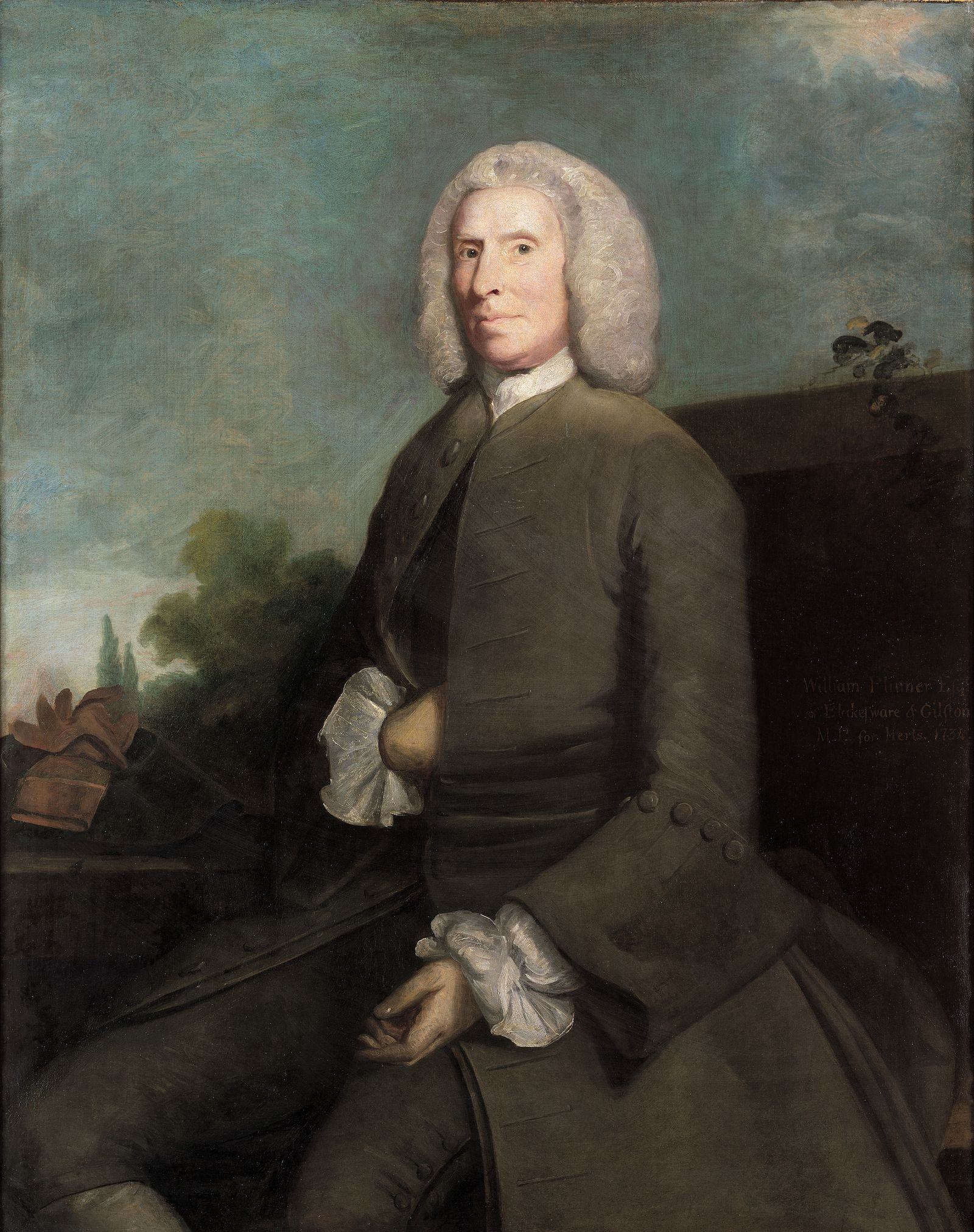
- Portrait by Sir Joshua Reynolds, 1755

Member of Parliament for Hertfordshire
- In office 1755–1761
- Preceded by: Paggen Hale; Charles Gore
- Succeeded by: Thomas Plumer Byde; Jacob Houblon
- In office 1734–1741
- Preceded by: Charles Caesar; Sir Thomas Sebright, Bt
- Succeeded by: Jacob Houblon; Charles Gore

Member of Parliament for Yarmouth (Isle of Wight)
- In office 1721–1722
- Preceded by: Anthony Morgan; Sir Theodore Janssen, Bt.
- Succeeded by: Anthony Morgan; Thomas Stanwix

William Plumer (c. 1686 – 12 December 1767) was a British lawyer and Whig, who sat in the House of Commons intermittently between 1721 and 1761.

Plumer was the second surviving son of John Plumer, a wealthy London merchant of Blakesware, Hertfordshire, and his wife Mary Hale, daughter of William Hale and his wife Mary Elwes of Kings Walden, Hertfordshire and sister of the eminent judge Sir Bernard Hale. His brothers were Richard and Walter Plumer. He was educated at Bishop’s Stortford and was admitted at Peterhouse, Cambridge on 9 May 1702. In 1702, he was admitted at Gray's Inn and was called to the bar in 1708. He succeeded to some of his father’s estates in 1719.

Plumer was returned as Member of Parliament for Yarmouth (Isle of Wight) at a by-election on 10 February 1721. He was brought in on the Treasury interest to replace Sir Theodore Janssen, who had been expelled over the South Sea Bubble and did not stand in 1722.

Plumer was out of Parliament for over ten years, but was politically active in supporting Charles Caesar at elections at Hertfordshire. He became a bencher of his Inn in 1728 and married Elizabeth Byde, daughter of Thomas Byde of Ware Park, Hertfordshire on 9 October 1731.

At the 1734 Plumer was selected as a candidate for Hertfordshire at a meeting of county electors and was elected MP, defeating Caesar. There is no record of votes by Plumer although he was described as supporting the administration. He did not stand in the 1741 general election.

Plumer succeeded to some of the estates of his brother Walter in 1746. He was returned as MP for Hertfordshire at a by-election on 1 May 1755 but did not stand again at the 1761 general election.

Plumer died on 12 December 1767 and was buried at Eastwick, Hertfordshire. He and his wife had two sons and four daughters. He was succeeded by his son William who was also an MP.

Parliament of Great Britain
Preceded by Colonel Anthony Morgan; Sir Theodore Janssen	Member of Parliament for Yarmouth (Isle of Wight); 1721–1722; With: Colonel Anthony Morgan	Succeeded by Colonel Anthony Morgan; Thomas Stanwix
Preceded by Charles Caesar; Sir Thomas Sebright, Bt	Member of Parliament for Hertfordshire; 1734–1741; With: Sir Thomas Sebright, Bt; Charles Caesar 1736	Succeeded by Jacob Houblon; Charles Gore
Preceded by Paggen Hale; Charles Gore	Member of Parliament for Hertfordshire; 1755–1761; With: Charles Gore	Succeeded by Thomas Plumer Byde; Jacob Houblon
