= English Chronicle =

London-based, evening newspaper (published 1779–1843)

The English Chronicle was a thrice-weekly evening newspaper founded in London in 1779.

== History and profile ==
The Chronicle was founded in 1779 although the founders are not known. In 1781 it was given the supplementary title Or, Universal Evening Post. The paper was acquired by John Weble and John Bell in 1786. In 1802 the paper merged with the Whitehall Evening Post to become The English Chronicle, or, Whitehall Evening Post. The newspaper ceased publication in 1843.
