= Peter Legh =

Peter Legh may refer to:

- Peter Legh (died 1642), Member of Parliament for Newton
- Peter Legh (MP for Cheshire), Member of Parliament for Cheshire and Wigan
- Peter Legh (died 1672), Member of Parliament for Newton
- Peter Legh (died 1744), Member of Parliament for Newton
- Peter Legh (1706–1792), Member of Parliament for Newton
- Peter Legh (1723–1804), Member of Parliament for Ilchester
- Peter Legh, 4th Baron Newton (1915–1992), British Conservative politician, Member of Parliament for Petersfield
