= John Dryden (English politician) =

English politician

John Dryden (c. 1641 – 3 January 1708) was an English politician who sat as MP for Huntingdonshire from 1690 till 1695 and from 8 April 1699 till 3 January 1708.

He was the son of Sir John Dryden, 2nd Baronet and his third wife Honor, the daughter of Sir Robert Bevill. He was educated at Wadham College, Oxford and matriculated in 1651, he entered the Middle Temple in 1654.

He inherited the Chesterton estate from his father and became part of the county elite. During the reign of Charles II, he served in local offices such as justice of the peace, deputy-lieutenant, commissioner for recusants and sheriff. He expressed support for the King James' Declaration of Indulgence (1687). In the 1690 general election, he and Robert Montagu were elected unopposed. He invested in government loans after the Revolution, proposed a clause to the million fund bill on 20 January 1693, and served as a teller on 6 January 1694 against considering a petition from rival East India merchants.

He did not stand in the 1695 general election but was returned to parliament after a by-election in 1699.

Dryden died at Chesterton on 3 January 1708 and was buried there. In his will, he named his nephew Robert Pigott as heir to most of his property.
