= Richard Goulston =

English politician

Richard Goulston (c. 1669 – 18 March 1731) was an English politician who served as MP for Hertford from 21 February 1701 till 6 December 1705 and 1710 till 24 May 1715.

He was baptised on 15 April 1669, he was the first son of James Goulston and Mary, the daughter of John Rowley. He married by November 1701, Margaret, the daughter of Dr Francis Turner and had 2 sons. His father died in 1704.
