= Henry Crispe (MP for Lancaster) =

English Member of Parliament

Henry Crispe (c. 1650–1700), of Aldermanbury, London, was an English Member of Parliament (MP).

He was a Member of the Parliament of England for Lancaster in 1685.

Parliament of England
Preceded by Richard Kirkby; William Spencer	Member of Parliament for Lancaster; 1685; With: Roger Kirkby	Succeeded by Curwen Rawlinson; Thomas Preston
