= Sir William Lowther, 1st Baronet, of Marske =

English landowner

Sir William Lowther, 1st Baronet (4 January 1676 – 6 April 1705) was an English landowner from Marske-by-the-Sea, Yorkshire. He was the eldest son of Anthony Lowther and Margaret Penn, daughter of Sir William Penn.

On 15 June 1697, he was created a baronet.

He married Catherine Preston and had three children:

- Sir Thomas Lowther, 2nd Baronet (1699–1745)
- Catherine Lowther
- Margaret Lowther

Parliament of England
Preceded by Roger Kirkby; Robert Heysham	Member of Parliament for Lancaster; 1702–1705; With: Robert Heysham	Succeeded by Robert Heysham; William Heysham
Baronetage of England
New title	Baronet (of Marske); 1697–1705	Succeeded by Thomas Lowther
