= Thomas Hungate =

English politician (c. 1516–1579)

The Honourable Thomas Hungate
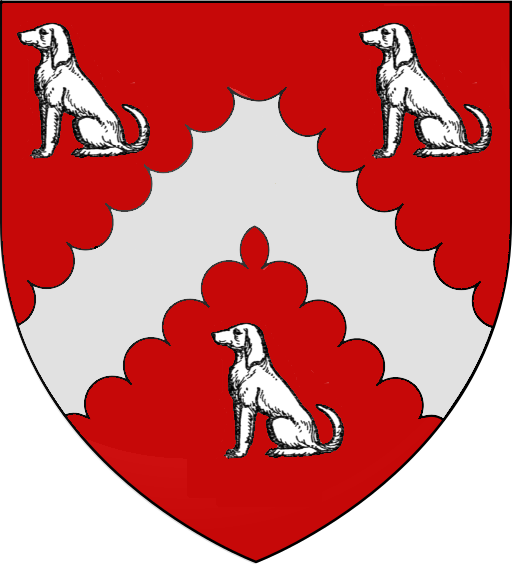
- Arms of Hungate of Saxton: Gules, a chevron engrailed between three hounds sejant, Argent

Member of Parliament for Maldon
- In office 1554–1554
- Preceded by: Anthony Browne
- Succeeded by: Anthony Browne

Member of Parliament for Lancaster
- In office 1555–1555
- Preceded by: Richard Weston
- Succeeded by: William Rice

Member of Parliament for Newport Iuxta Launceston
- In office 1558–1558
- Preceded by: William Stourton
- Succeeded by: Richard Grenville

Personal details
- Born: c. 1516
- Died: 1579 (aged 62–63)
- Resting place: All Saints' church, Saxton; 53.826°N 1.27872°W
- Spouse: Isabel Metham
- Children: William Hungate; Thomas Hungate
- Parents: William Hungate; Alice Gower

Thomas Hungate (c. 1516 – 1579) of Saxton, North Yorkshire, was an English politician. He was a Member of the Parliament of England (MP) for the seat of Maldon in 1554, Lancaster in 1555 and Newport Iuxta Launceston in 1558.

== Early life and marriage ==
Hungate was born about 1516, the third son of William Hungate (d. 1547) of Saxton and Alice Gower, daughter of Sir William Gower of Stittenham, Yorkshire.

He married Isabel Metham, daughter of Sir Thomas Metham of Metham, with whom he had two sons:

- William Hungate
- Thomas Hungate

== Career ==
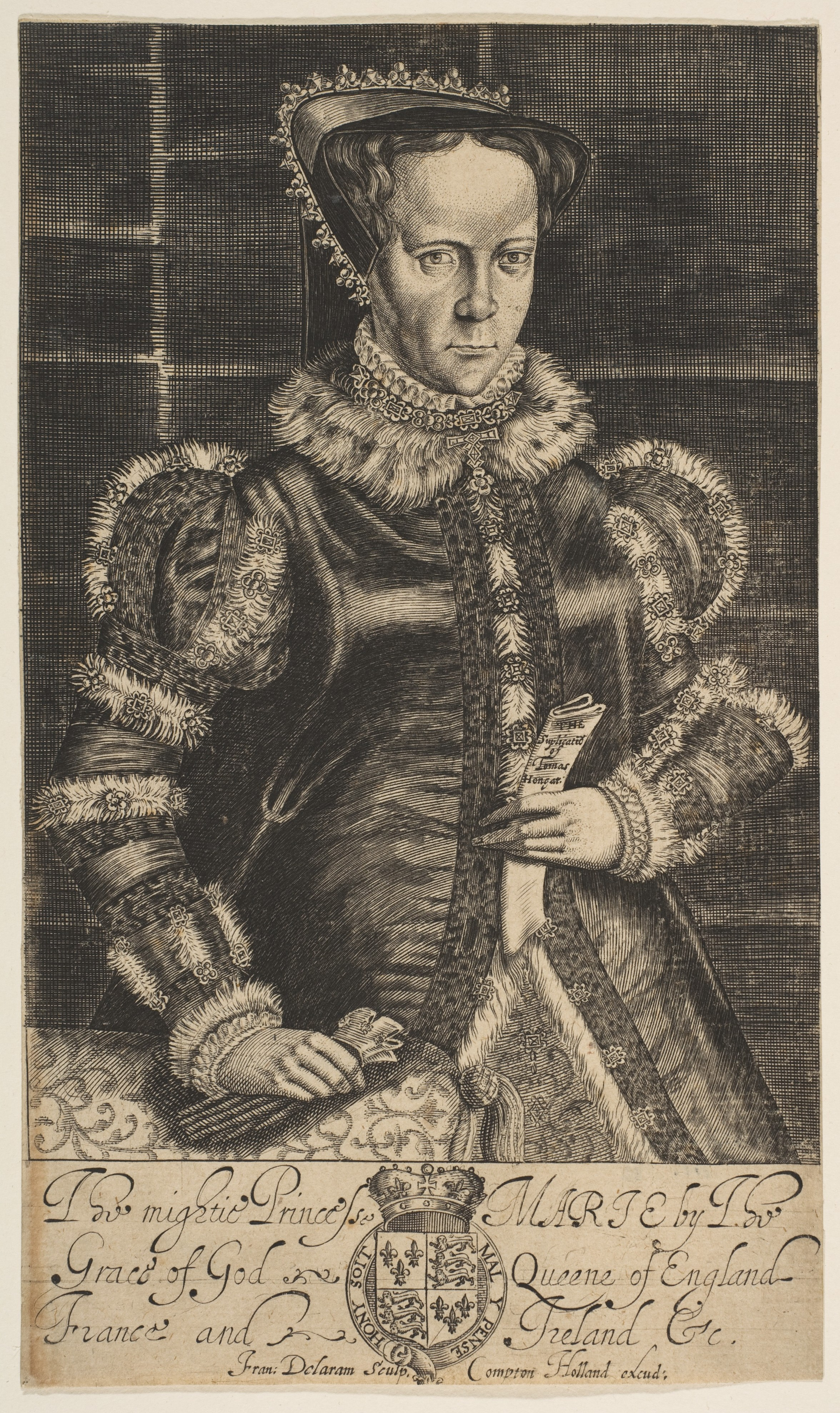
Mary I, Queen of England by Francis Delaram. A sheet of paper in her left hand has the inscription: "The suplicated of Tomas Hongat (Thomas Hungate)."

Hungate was a servant of Sir Anthony Browne by 1535; avener to Queen Jane Seymour by 1537, to Anne of Cleves and Catherine Parr; commissioner of sewers, for Lincolnshire, Nottinghamshire and Yorkshire in 1545; member of the household of Princess Mary by 1551 to 1553; forester, Galtres, Yorkshire from 1554 to 1572; esquire of the body by September, 1554 to 1558.

In July 1553 Princess Mary wrote to the Privy Council from Kenninghall, demanding that it renounce Jane Grey and recognize her as queen, as her father's will decreed.

Mary sent her servant, Thomas Hungate, to deliver her letters to the Council in London. Hungate, who had "eagerly offered himself for this task, despite is danger", hurried to London where he "bravely delivered the queen's commands to Northumberland and the other noblemen and gave them her letters."

Hungate arrived on 10 July, while the Council was in session, with letters from Kenninghall dated the day before. The Duke of Northumberland told him that at his age, he should have had more sense. He was immediately sent to the Tower of London.

He received no preferment during the reign of Elizabeth I.

== Death ==
His wife and sons had died before he made his will which was dated 16 April 1578. The supervisors of his will, in which he left legacies to a number of relations, were Anthony Browne, 1st Viscount Montagu, Sir William Cordell and Thomas Radclyffe, 3rd Earl of Sussex; Cordell and Sussex were to share an annuity of £20 "for the great goodness heretofore I have found and for the great goodness I hope hereafter mine shall find at their hands". He died in 1579 and was buried in the Hungate quire of Saxton church.
