= Christopher Rawlinson =

Christopher Rawlinson may refer to:

- Christopher Rawlinson (antiquary) (1677–1733), English antiquary
- Christopher Rawlinson (judge) (1806–1888), Indian judge
- Chris Rawlinson (born 1972), English track and field athlete
