= Roger Kirkby (died 1709) =

English soldier and politician

Colonel Roger Kirkby (c. 1649 – 8 February 1709) was an English soldier and politician, of Kirkby Ireleth in Lancashire, the eldest son of Richard Kirkby and his first wife Elizabeth Murray.

An ensign in the Coldstream Guards in 1670, he was a captain in Charles Wheeler's Regiment of Foot in 1678, and colonel in Sir James Leslie's Regiment of Foot in 1689. By this time, he had succeeded his father as Member of Parliament for Lancaster.

He was Governor of Chester from 1693 until 1702, and was chosen High Sheriff of Lancashire for 1709 but died in office.

On 7 August 1692, he married Catherine Baker, and had a son:

- Richard Baker Kirkby (d. 4 May 1717)

Parliament of England
Preceded by Richard Kirkby; William Spencer	Member of Parliament for Lancaster; 1685–1689; With: Henry Crispe	Succeeded by Thomas Preston; Curwen Rawlinson
Preceded by Thomas Preston; Curwen Rawlinson	Member of Parliament for Lancaster; 1689–1702; With: Thomas Preston 1689–1697; Fitton Gerard 1697–1698; Robert Heysham 1698–1702	Succeeded by Robert Heysham; Sir William Lowther, Bt
