= 1928 Lancaster by-election =

UK parliamentary by-election

The 1928 Lancaster by-election was a parliamentary by-election held in England for the House of Commons constituency of Lancaster on 9 February 1928.

== Vacancy ==
The by-election was caused by the elevation to the peerage of the sitting Conservative MP, Sir Gerald Strickland. Strickland had been elected as MP for Lancaster at the 1924 general election gaining the seat from the Liberals.

General election 1924 Electorate 38,459
Party	Candidate	Votes	%	±%
Unionist	Gerald Strickland	15,243	47.8	+7.0
Liberal	John Joseph O'Neill	11,085	34.7	−24.5
Labour	Harold Mostyn Watkins	5,572	17.5	New
Majority		4,158	13.1	N/A
Turnout		31,900	82.9	+2.9
Unionist gain from Liberal		Swing	+15.8	

== Candidates ==
=== Conservatives ===
The Conservatives selected 40-year-old Herwald Ramsbotham. Ramsbotham was educated at Uppingham and University College, Oxford, had been called to the Bar in 1911 but entered a City export business. He had also had a distinguished service career during World War One, being three times mentioned in despatches. Although Ramsbotham now resided in Radlett in Hertfordshire, he had strong connections with the Lancaster constituency. He had been the Unionist candidate there at the December 1910 general election when, although he lost, he had caused the Liberal majority in the seat to fall from 1,084 to just 134.

=== Liberals ===
The Liberals chose Robert Parkinson Tomlinson, a 46-year-old corn merchant from Poulton-le-Fylde and former parliamentary candidate in the Fylde constituency. Tomlinson was seen as a local man as his home was just across the constituency border and was known for his religious work as a Wesleyan lay preacher across Lancashire.

=== Labour ===
The Labour Party settled upon the Reverend David R Davies, a Congregational minister from Southport as their candidate. Davies was originally from Glamorgan and was for 12 years a coal miner. He had beaten off the challenge of a local Labour hopeful to win the candidate selection and was described as an advocate of extreme socialism.

== Issues ==
=== Agriculture ===
Agriculture was an early issue in the election, with the Liberals aiming a direct appeal at the farmers. This followed the controversy over the Liberal Land enquiry of 1925, instigated by David Lloyd George which had been published as Land and the Nation (also known as the Green Book). It proposed an element of land nationalisation and caused controversy in the party. After heated debate, the more extreme proposals had been taken out and reference to the party's traditional policy of Land Value Taxation strengthened, but reform of the agricultural system to benefit rural workers remained a key Liberal policy. In addition, Tomlinson was able to take advantage of his profession as a corn miller to present himself as someone who knew agriculture well and had its interests at heart. There was a general dissatisfaction among farmers and rural workers with the policy of the Tory government towards agricultural affairs with many claiming to have been promised much by Stanley Baldwin’s administration but with little to show for it. Tomlinson argued that what the farmers wanted more than anything was security of tenure.

Ramsbotham however was a member of the National Farmers Union and said he stood for many of the Union's demands, including the easing of local rates on farms and farm buildings, special purchasing arrangements for meat to feed the British armed forces and the rectifying of other grievances concerning imported milk and eggs. He also attacked the Liberal position on land nationalisation and the bureaucratic control of farmers which Land and the Nation had recommended.

=== Socialism ===
Davies focused his appeal to the electorate on philosophical grounds, pointing out the unfairness of social and political systems based on vested interests to the permanent and deep disadvantage of working people. However Labour's ability to get their messages across seem to have been hampered from the outset by the tactical difficulty of being the third party in a three-cornered contest. At the 1924 general election, the Labour candidate had come third with 17.5% of the poll. It became plain that, despite a good Labour showing in other by-elections, in particular the Labour gain from the Conservatives at Northampton on 9 January, Lancaster would be a struggle for supremacy between the Conservative and Liberal candidates. By February it was being reported that the Labour team was growing in despondency as the awareness of this situation became increasingly apparent.

=== Defence of the government ===
Ramsbotham generally took the line of fighting on the government's record and attacking the opposition parties for what he called their lack of effectiveness in Parliament. He also attacked the pretensions of the socialist candidate and Liberal problems concerning the leadership of their party. He defended the government's expenditure on the military and the conversion of War Debt and warned about opposition attempts to misrepresent these policies. Ramsbotham told the electorate that no party had a positive cure for unemployment, which could only be remedied by an improvement in trade. Whether true or not, this emollient line could have given little comfort to those suffering from being out of work or fearing unemployment in a difficult economic climate. As Ramsbotham spoke out for the government's success, so Tomlinson went on the attack. He argued that the government had failed to keep its pledges, that it must reduce expenditure and that it had failed to grasp the problems in the coal industry in the aftermath of the General Strike. Among other policies, he particularly advocated an extension of the national insurance scheme, electoral reform to ensure majority rule, temperance and land taxation reform.

=== Religion ===
Ramsbotham, in his election address, referred to the question of religious education in schools, which he supported as a vital need. He said that children should be taught the religion desired by their parents and this was thought to have been an appeal to Roman Catholic voters in Lancaster where a local controversy over their schools had recently arisen. Given the strong nonconformist associations of the Liberal and Labour candidates, this could be seen as an intelligent appeal.

== The intervention of Lord Ashton ==
James Williamson, 1st Baron Ashton was a successful businessman, whose family firm in Lancaster produced oil cloth and linoleum. He had been Liberal MP for Lancaster from 1888 to 1895 when he was made a peer. He created Lancaster's Williamson Park and after the death of his second wife, Jessy, he built the Ashton Memorial on a hill in the park. He was High Sheriff of Lancashire in 1885, sometime Deputy Lieutenant of the county and a Justice of the Peace . Ashton was therefore well known and influential in the Lancaster constituency.

On 6 February 1928, following a visit to Lancaster by David Lloyd George a few days earlier to campaign for Tomlinson, Ashton wrote a public letter of support to Ramsbotham. In the letter, which bore the address Ryelands, Lancaster, Ashton attacked Lloyd George on a number of policy questions but also described the former prime minister as the man who had wrecked the Liberal Party and someone who was not fully trusted by his own political associates. Ashton said the present position of the Liberal Party was entirely the fault of Lloyd George and could not be put right for a generation. He painted Lloyd George as more extreme than moderate members of the Labour Party and accused him of disloyalty to his party and country during the General Strike. Ashton raised the issue of Tomlinson's relationship with the Lloyd George fund, claiming that when asked if he was financed by it he evaded the question. He ended by associating Tomlinson with what Lloyd George had described as ‘the whole advanced programme of Liberalism,’ which included radical measures such as those on agriculture in the Green Book and which were thought on the right to be tantamount to socialism.

This intervention naturally worried the Liberals. It was reported that Ashton had a record of publicly declaring his support in Lancaster elections since 1922 and that on each occasion the candidate securing his endorsement had gone on to win the seat. Nevertheless, the same report also queried if Ashton's support for a candidate was actually overrated. In response to Ashton's letter, Tomlinson characterised its tone as an envenomed and bitter attack on Lloyd George. He re-iterated that he was standing for election as a Liberal without prefix or suffix, implying that the divisions in the Liberal Party occasioned by the split between Lloyd George and H H Asquith were now completely a thing of the past. As if to underline this new unity he declared he was supported not only by Lloyd George but by Asquith, who had sent him a letter of support, and by Herbert Samuel. The Liberals arranged for Lloyd George to issue a statement in rebuttal and for him return to the constituency to make speeches at Lancaster and Morecambe.

Although the Conservatives painted Ashton's intervention as an internal disagreement between Liberals, they were plainly delighted to have received Ashton's endorsement and Ramsbotham clearly relished bringing the issue of the letter back to the attention of the electorate as late as meetings on the eve of poll itself. By this time too the Liberals were recovering some lost ground over the letter. Lloyd George claimed two days before polling day that the letter had been written for Lord Ashton by an unnamed Tory MP and alleged he had been told this by the writer of the letter himself. Ashton spluttered out a denial.

== Result ==
The result was a victory for Tomlinson, turning a Conservative majority of 4,158 into a Liberal majority of 1,829. The Labour vote remained at broadly the same level from that of the previous general election. The turnout was 82.7%.

Lancaster by-election, 1928 Electorate 40,705
Party	Candidate	Votes	%	±%
Liberal	Robert Parkinson Tomlinson	14,689	43.7	+9.0
Unionist	Herwald Ramsbotham	12,860	38.2	−9.6
Labour	David R Davies	6,101	18.1	+0.6
Majority		1,829	5.5	N/A
Turnout		33,650	82.7	−0.2
Liberal gain from Unionist		Swing	+9.3	

This victory, together with other Liberal by-election gains which followed at St Ives a month later, and at Eddisbury and Holland with Boston both in March 1929, gave great heart to the Liberal Party and caused the Conservatives to fear the possibility of Liberal revival. They should however have been more worried about the rise of Labour. Over the course of the 1924-1929 Parliament, Labour made thirteen by-election gains in all, eleven from the Tories, and two from the Liberals.

== Aftermath ==
General election 1929 Electorate 52,774
Party	Candidate	Votes	%	±%
Unionist	Herwald Ramsbotham	17,414	39.3	+1.2
Liberal	Robert Parkinson Tomlinson	16,977	38.3	−5.4
Labour	Reginald Penrith Burnett	9,903	22.4	+4.3
Majority		437	1.0	N/A
Turnout		44,294	83.9	+1.2
Unionist gain from Liberal		Swing	+3.2	

Labour went on to win the 1929 general election and, despite a rise in their Parliamentary representation, the Liberal position in British in politics did not recover enough to halt the decline which had started with the Asquith-Lloyd George split in 1916. In Lancaster however, Ramsbotham had the last laugh. He won the seat from the Liberals at the 1929 general and held it until 1941 when he went to the House of Lords as Lord Soulbury.

== See also ==
- List of United Kingdom by-elections
- United Kingdom by-election records
