= Fitton Gerard, 3rd Earl of Macclesfield =

British peer

The Right Honourable Fitton Gerard
- The Earl of Macclesfield
- Tenure: 1701–1702
- Predecessor: Charles Gerard, 2nd Earl of Macclesfield
- Successor: Title extinct
- Born: 15 October 1663
- Died: 26 December 1702 (aged 39)
- Father: Charles Gerard, 1st Earl of Macclesfield
- Mother: Jane de Civelle

Fitton Gerard, 3rd Earl of Macclesfield (15 October 1663 – 26 December 1702), was an English peer, styled Hon. Fitton Gerard until 1701.

== Biography ==
He was the younger son of Charles Gerard, 1st Earl of Macclesfield, and represented several constituencies, mostly in Lancashire, in the House of Commons of England, before succeeding his brother Charles Gerard, 2nd Earl of Macclesfield, to the earldom in 1701. He was appointed a deputy lieutenant of Lancashire that year, but died in the following year, the earldom becoming extinct.

After his death, there was a long legal dispute between the Duke of Hamilton, and Lord Mohun over who should succeed to Gawsworth Hall and Macclesfield's estates. Hamilton's claim was through his wife, Elizabeth Gerard, a granddaughter of Charles Gerard, 1st Earl of Macclesfield, while Mohun's was as the named heir of his friend the second earl of Macclesfield. On 15 November 1712, the two men fought a famous duel in Hyde Park, Westminster, described in Thackeray's The History of Henry Esmond and in Bernard Burke's Anecdotes of the Aristocracy.

Parliament of England
Preceded by Thomas Wyndham; William Hewer	Member of Parliament for Yarmouth; 1689–1690; With: Sir Robert Holmes	Succeeded by Sir John Trevor; Charles Duncombe
Preceded by Anthony Parker; Roger Kenyon	Member of Parliament for Clitheroe; 1693–1695; With: Roger Kenyon	Succeeded by Christopher Lister; Ambrose Pudsay
Preceded by Thomas Preston; Roger Kirkby	Member of Parliament for Lancaster; 1697–1698; With: Roger Kirkby	Succeeded by Roger Kirkby; Robert Heysham
Preceded by Hon. James Stanley; Sir Ralph Assheton, Bt	Member of Parliament for Lancashire; 1698 – February 1701; With: Hon. James Stanley	Succeeded by Hon. James Stanley; Richard Bold
Peerage of England
Preceded by Charles Gerard	Earl of Macclesfield; 1701–1702	Extinct
