= George Marton =

George Marton may refer to:

- George Marton (1801–1867), British Conservative Party Member of Parliament (MP) for Lancaster 1837–1847
- George Marton (1839–1905), his son, Conservative MP for Lancaster 1885–1886
