= Thomas Greene (MP) =

British politician (1794–1872)

The Right Honourable Thomas Greene

Member of Parliament for Lancaster
- In office 12 April 1853 – 28 March 1857 Serving with Samuel Gregson
- Preceded by: Robert Baynes Armstrong; Samuel Gregson
- Succeeded by: William Garnett; Samuel Gregson
- In office 20 April 1824 – 9 July 1852 Serving with Robert Baynes Armstrong (1848–1852); Samuel Gregson (1847–1848); George Marton (1837–1847); Patrick Maxwell Stewart (1831–1837); John Fenton-Crawthorne (1824–1831)
- Preceded by: John Fenton-Cawthorne; Gabriel Doveton
- Succeeded by: Robert Baynes Armstrong; Samuel Gregson

Personal details
- Born: 19 January 1794
- Died: 8 August 1872 (aged 78)
- Party: Peelite
- Other political affiliations: Conservative; Tory

Thomas Greene (19 January 1794 – 8 August 1872) was a British Peelite, Conservative and Tory politician.

== Early life ==
Greene was born on 19 January 1794, the only son of Thomas Greene of Slyne and Whittington and Martha Dawson, daughter and co-heiress of Edmund Dawson of Warton. His father, a barrister, chambers in Gray's and a house in Bedford Square.

He was educated at Lancaster Royal Grammar School before attending Oriel College, Oxford in 1811. He studied at Gray's Inn before being called to the bar in 1819.

== Career ==
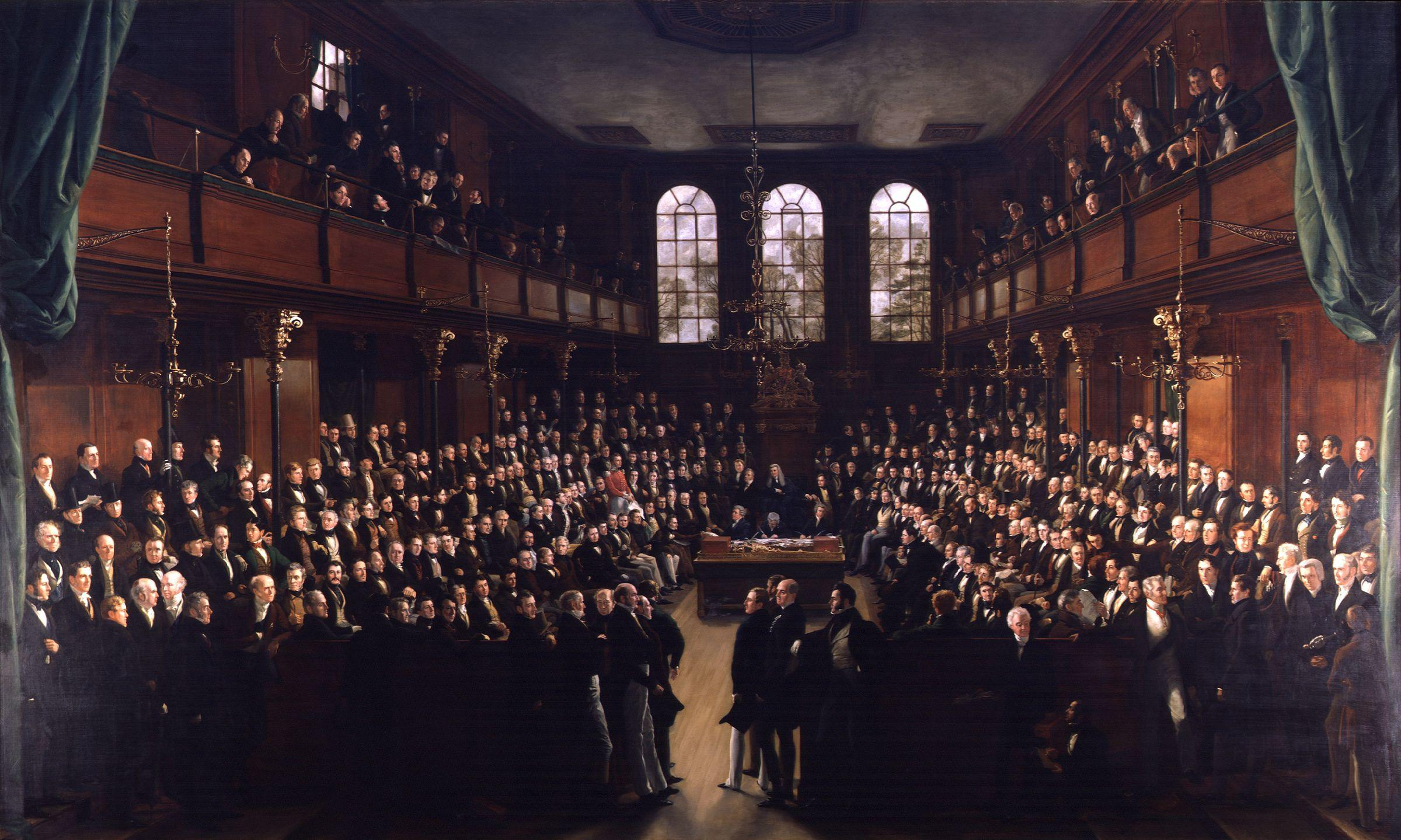
Thomas Greene as featured in The House of Commons, by Sir George Hayter, 1833

Greene was first elected Tory MP for Lancaster at a by-election in 1824 and held the seat until 1852—becoming a Conservative in 1834, and a Peelite around 1847. He later regained the seat at a by-election in 1853—caused by the unseating of Robert Baynes Armstrong due to corruption and bribery—but stood down at the next election in 1857.

He served as High Sheriff of Lancashire from 1823 to 1824, and as Constable of Lancaster Castle from 1865 until his death in 1872.

Greene's family had owned land in Slyne and Hest Bank since the reign of King James I. Between 1831 and 1836, Greene had architect George Webster design and build Whittington Hall on the site of an earlier house.

== Personal life ==
On 30 August 1820, Greene married Henrietta Russell (d. 1882), a daughter of Sir Henry Russell, 1st Baronet, of Swallowfield. Together, they were the parents of three sons and two daughters, including:

- Henrietta Greene (1821–1859), who married Anthony Wilson Thorold, Bishop of Winchester, a grandson of Sir John Thorold, 9th Baronet, MP.
- Dawson Cornelius Greene (1822–1887), an Army Officer who married his cousin, Mary Russell, daughter of Sir Henry Russell, 2nd Baronet.
- Thomas Huntley Greene (1823–1887), a Reverend who married Helen Stuart, youngest daughter of Gen. Hon. Sir Patrick Stuart (a son of Alexander Stuart, 10th Lord Blantyre), in 1857.
- Rose Alice Clothilde Greene (1825–1899), who married barrister John Clerk, a younger son of Sir George Clerk, 6th Baronet.
- Henry Aylmer Greene (1827–1877), who died unmarried.

After a long illness, Greene died at Whittington on 8 August 1872. On Greene's death, Whittington Hall passed to his eldest son, Dawson, who retired to live in London and was succeeded by his son, Henry Dawson Dawson-Greene.

Parliament of the United Kingdom
Preceded by Robert Baynes Armstrong; Samuel Gregson	Member of Parliament for Lancaster; 1853–1857; With: Samuel Gregson	Succeeded by William Garnett; Samuel Gregson
Preceded by John Fenton-Cawthorne; Gabriel Doveton	Member of Parliament for Lancaster; 1824–1852; With: Robert Baynes Armstrong (1848–1852); Samuel Gregson (1847–1848); George Marton (1837–1847); Patrick Maxwell Stewart (1831–1837); John Fenton-Crawthorne (1824–1831)	Succeeded by Robert Baynes Armstrong; Samuel Gregson
