= 1941 Lancaster by-election =

UK parliamentary by-election

The 1941 Lancaster by-election was a parliamentary by-election for the British House of Commons constituency of Lancaster, Lancashire, held on 15 October 1941.

== Vacancy ==
The by-election was caused by the elevation of the sitting Conservative MP, Rt Hon. Herwald Ramsbotham in August 1941. He was raised to the peerage as Baron Soulbury, of Soulbury in the County of Buckingham. He had represented Lancaster since winning the seat in 1929.

== Election history ==
The Conservatives had won the Lancaster seat at every election since 1929, when they gained the seat from the Liberal MP, Robert Parkinson Tomlinson. The result at the last general election was as follows;

1935 general election : Lancaster Electorate 62,792
Party	Candidate	Votes	%	±%
Conservative	Herwald Ramsbotham	26,632	53.7	−22.0
Liberal	Robert Parkinson Tomlinson	13,054	26.3	New
Labour	Charles Royle	9,938	20.0	−4.2
Majority		13,578	27.4	−23.1
Turnout		49,624	79.0	
Conservative hold		Swing		

== Candidates ==
The local Conservatives selected first time candidate, 30-year-old Lt. Fitzroy MacLean. Before the war, he worked as a diplomat. In 1939 he enlisted as a private in the Queen's Own Cameron Highlanders. He was soon promoted to lance corporal and was commissioned in 1941.

The Liberals had selected 63-year-old Lt-Col. William Charles Ross to contest a general election expected to occur in 1939–40. He had contested Manchester Withington in 1935. He was retired from the Indian Medical Service. Before the war, the Labour party had selected Albert Edward Victor Ainsworth Farrer as prospective candidate. At the declaration of war, the Conservative, Liberal and Labour parties had agreed an electoral truce which meant that when a by-election occurred, the party that was defending the seat would not be opposed by an official candidate from the other two parties. When the Labour and Liberal parties joined the Coalition government in May 1940, it was agreed that any by-election candidate defending a government seat would receive a letter of endorsement jointly signed by all the party leaders. This was enough to persuade Farrer, the Labour candidate, to withdraw. However, Ross, the Liberal candidate, decided to put his name forward.

Although there was no Labour candidate, 53-year-old Fenner Brockway stood as candidate for the Independent Labour Party, who were not part of the electoral truce. Brockway stood for Parliament several times, including in 1924 in Westminster Abbey. In 1929, he was elected Member of Parliament for Leyton East as a Labour Party candidate. In 1931 Brockway lost his seat and the following year he disaffiliated from the Labour Party along with the rest of the ILP. He stood unsuccessfully for the ILP in the 1934 West Ham Upton by-election and in Norwich in the 1935 election. The ILP were opposed to British participation in the Second World War, a position that Brockway did not share, though he served as Chair of the Central Board for Conscientious objectors.

== Campaign ==
Polling day was set for 15 October 1941. When nominations closed, it was to reveal a three horse race.

MacLean received a joint letter of endorsement from all the leaders of the parties in the coalition.

== Result ==
The Conservative Party held the seat with an increased majority.

Lancaster by-election, 1941 Electorate 66,290
Party	Candidate	Votes	%	±%
Conservative	Fitzroy MacLean	15,783	56.9	+3.2
Independent Liberal	William Charles Ross	6,551	23.6	New
Ind. Labour Party	Fenner Brockway	5,418	19.5	New
Majority		9,232	33.3	+5.9
Turnout		27,752	41.9	−37.1
Conservative hold		Swing	+1.5	

== Aftermath ==
The result at the following general election;

General election 1945: Lancaster Electorate 73,063
Party	Candidate	Votes	%	±%
Conservative	Fitzroy Maclean	27,090	49.42	
Labour	Albert Farrer	19,367	35.33	
Liberal	Eric Johnson	8,357	15.25	
Majority		7,723	14.09	
Turnout		54,814		
Conservative hold		Swing		

== See also ==
- List of United Kingdom by-elections
- United Kingdom by-election records
