= Samuel Gregson =

British merchant, politician and philanthropist

Samuel Gregson (1793–1865) was a nineteenth-century British merchant, politician and philanthropist.

== Biography ==
Gregson was born 23rd July 1793 as the eldest child of Samuel Gregson (1762–1846), manager of the Lancaster Canal Company, and his wife Bella (1771-1841). He attended Lancaster Royal Grammar School, but left before he was 15, working for a time in Liverpool before moving to India in 1821.

In London he was Chairman of the East India and China Trading Association and a commodities trader.

After establishing a successful trading business, Gregson inherited land in Lancashire and also Manorial Rights and property in Cheshire through marriage. He predominantly, and his family provided the land and financial resources to construct Christ Church, Lancaster.

Gregson was a co-founder of the Natural History Museum.

=== Political career ===
Gregson won the Lancaster parliamentary seat in the 1847 general election, but the election was voided the following year following accusations of corruption, leading to a by-election. However, he was re-elected in 1852, 1857 and 1859.

=== Personal life ===
Gregson married a distant cousin named Ellen on 2nd March 1826. She died in 1857. They had a daughter named Elizabeth.

== See also ==
- The Gregson Centre

Parliament of the United Kingdom
Preceded by George Marton; Thomas Greene	Member of Parliament for Lancaster; 1847–1848; With: Thomas Greene	Succeeded by Thomas Greene; Robert Baynes Armstrong
Preceded by Thomas Greene; Robert Baynes Armstrong	Member of Parliament for Lancaster; 1852–1865; With: Robert Baynes Armstrong to 1853; Thomas Greene 1853–57; William Garnett 1857–64; Edward Fenwick from 1864	Succeeded by Edward Fenwick; Henry Schneider
