= George Marton (1801–1867) =

English Conservative politician

George Marton (1801 – 24 November 1867) was an English Conservative Party politician from Lancashire.

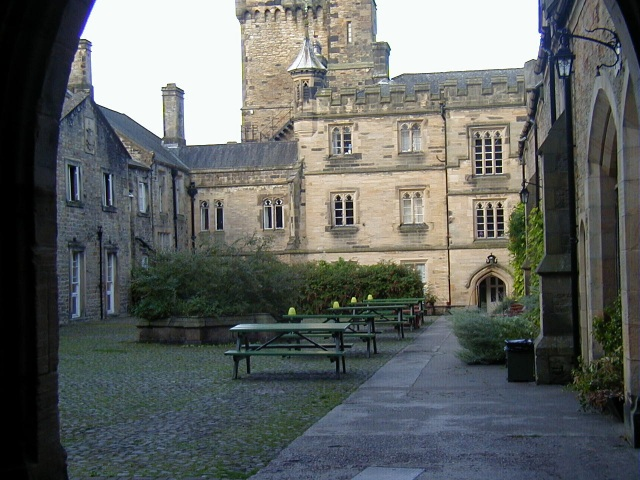
Capernwray Hall, home of the Marton family

At the 1837 general election, Marton was elected as Member of Parliament (MP) for Lancaster. He held the seat until he stood down from the House of Commons at the 1847 general election.

In the 1820s, Marton's family built the stately home Capernwray Hall, near Carnforth. He served as High Sheriff of Lancashire in 1858.

His son George Blucher Heneage Marton was briefly MP for Lancaster from 1885 to 1886.

Parliament of the United Kingdom
Preceded by Thomas Greene; Patrick Maxwell Stewart	Member of Parliament for Lancaster; 1837 – 1847; With: Thomas Greene	Succeeded by Thomas Greene; Samuel Gregson
