= Thomas Carus =

Member of the Parliament of England

Sir Thomas Carus SL (c.1515–5 July 1571) was an English barrister and judge who served as a Justice of the Queen's Bench.

Born to William Carus and Isabel Leyburn of Westmorland, he joined the Middle Temple in the 1530s and became Member of Parliament for Wigan in 1547. Carus also represented Lancaster in Parliament in 1553 and 1555, became a Serjeant-at-Law in April 1559, and was made a Justice of the Queen's Bench on 31 May 1567. He held this position until his death on 5 July 1571. He was knighted in 1567.

He married Catherine, the daughter of Thomas Preston of Preston Patrick, Westmorland. They had three sons and three daughters. He was initially succeeded by his eldest son Thomas, who purchased the manor of Halton and Halton Hall and who soon also died. He was eventually succeeded by his youngest son Christopher. Christopher, was the founder of a line that remained Catholic till the 18th century, when they supported the Jacobite rising of 1715 and subsequently had their properties confiscated.
