= William Henry Foster (Lancaster MP) =

British politician (1848–1908)

The Right Honourable William Henry Foster DL JP
- Photograph of Foster, 1895

Member of Parliament for Lancaster
- In office 1895–1900
- Preceded by: James Williamson
- Succeeded by: Norval Helme

Personal details
- Born: c. 1848
- Died: 27 March 1908 (aged 59–60)
- Spouse: Henrietta Warneford (m. 1879; died 1908)
- Relations: John Foster (grandfather)
- Parent: William Foster

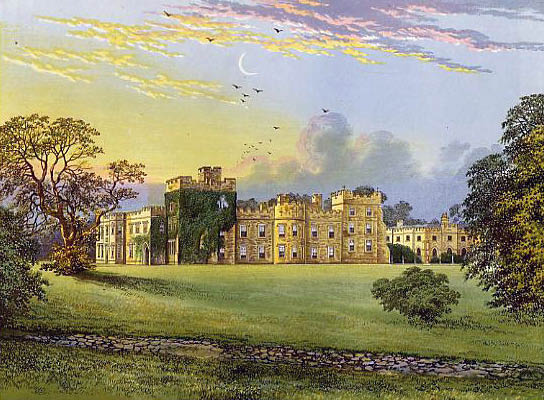
Hornby Castle, Foster's home in Lancashire, as pictured in Morris's Country Seats (1880)

Colonel William Henry Foster DL JP (c. 1848 – 27 March 1908) was a British businessman and Conservative Party politician, who owned the Black Dyke Mills in the West Riding of Yorkshire and lived in Hornby Castle in Lancashire. He sat in the House of Commons from 1895 to 1900.

== Early life ==
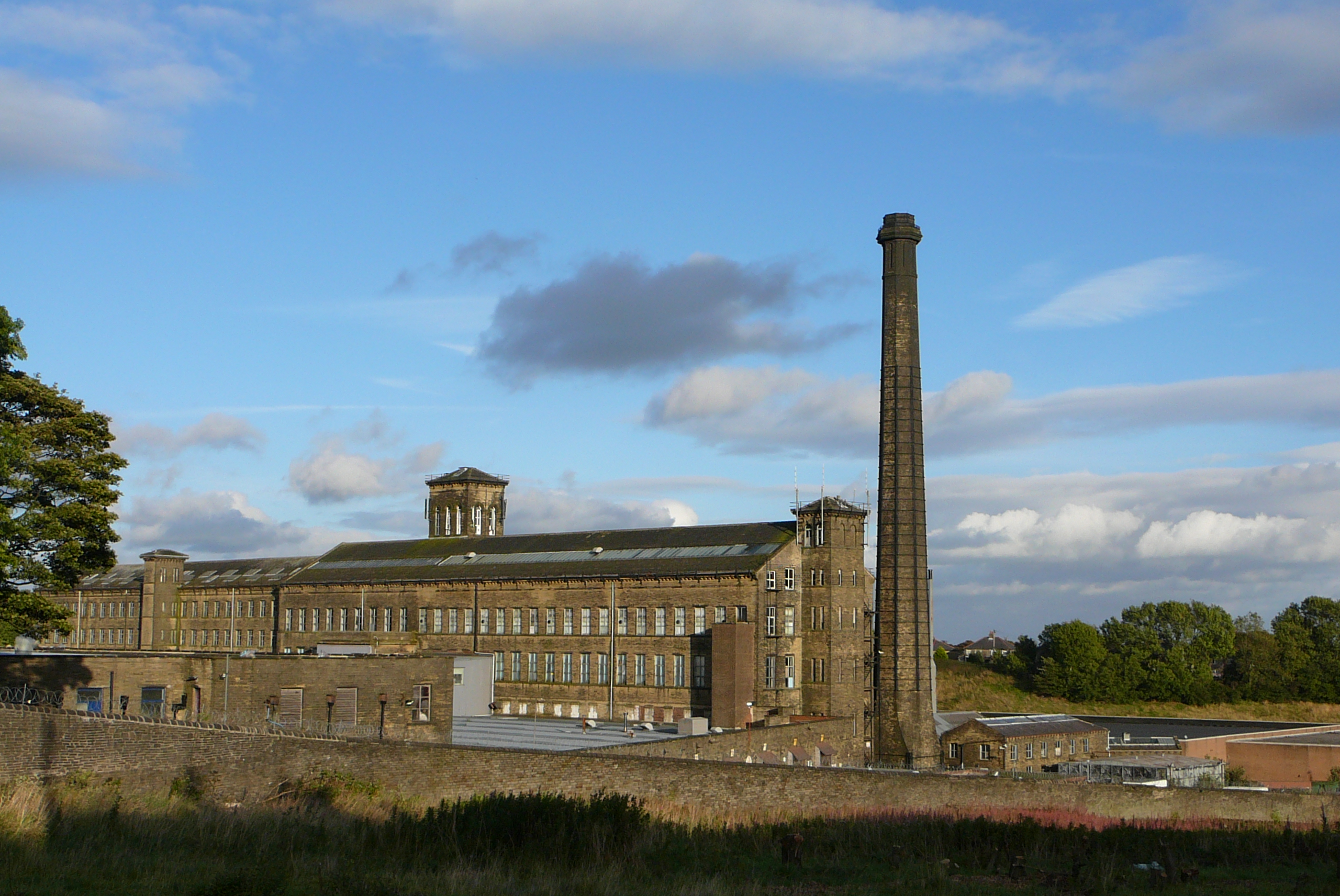
Black Dyke Mills, Foster's business in Queensbury, pictured in 2007

Foster was the son of William Foster, of Hornby Castle, Lancashire and of Queensbury, near Bradford in the West Riding of Yorkshire, and the former Ruth Briggs (a daughter of Abraham Briggs of Northowram). His younger brother was Johnston Jonas Foster, of Cliffe Hill, Lightcliffe. Through his brother, he was uncle to Ethel Jane Foster (wife of Lucius O'Brien, 15th Baron Inchiquin) and Gertrude Stansfeld Foster (wife of Constantine Phipps, 3rd Marquess of Normanby).

He was educated in Liverpool and abroad, and entered the family's textile business, becoming a director in 1842 of John Foster and Son Ltd in Queensbury, and other businesses.

== Career ==
The family's Black Dyke Mills, which dominated the village of Queensbury, became one of the world's largest makers of worsted cloth. The firm had been founded by his grandfather John Foster (1798–1879), who had retired to Hornby Castle and passed the company to his son William (1821–1884).

Foster was appointed as High Sheriff of Lancashire in June 1891, after the death of George Preston, and in September 1892 he became a Deputy Lieutenant of the West Riding of Yorkshire. He served in the militia as the Lieutenant-Colonel of the 2nd West Yorkshire Yeomanry Cavalry until his retirement in 1892, with the honorary rank of Colonel.

=== Politics ===
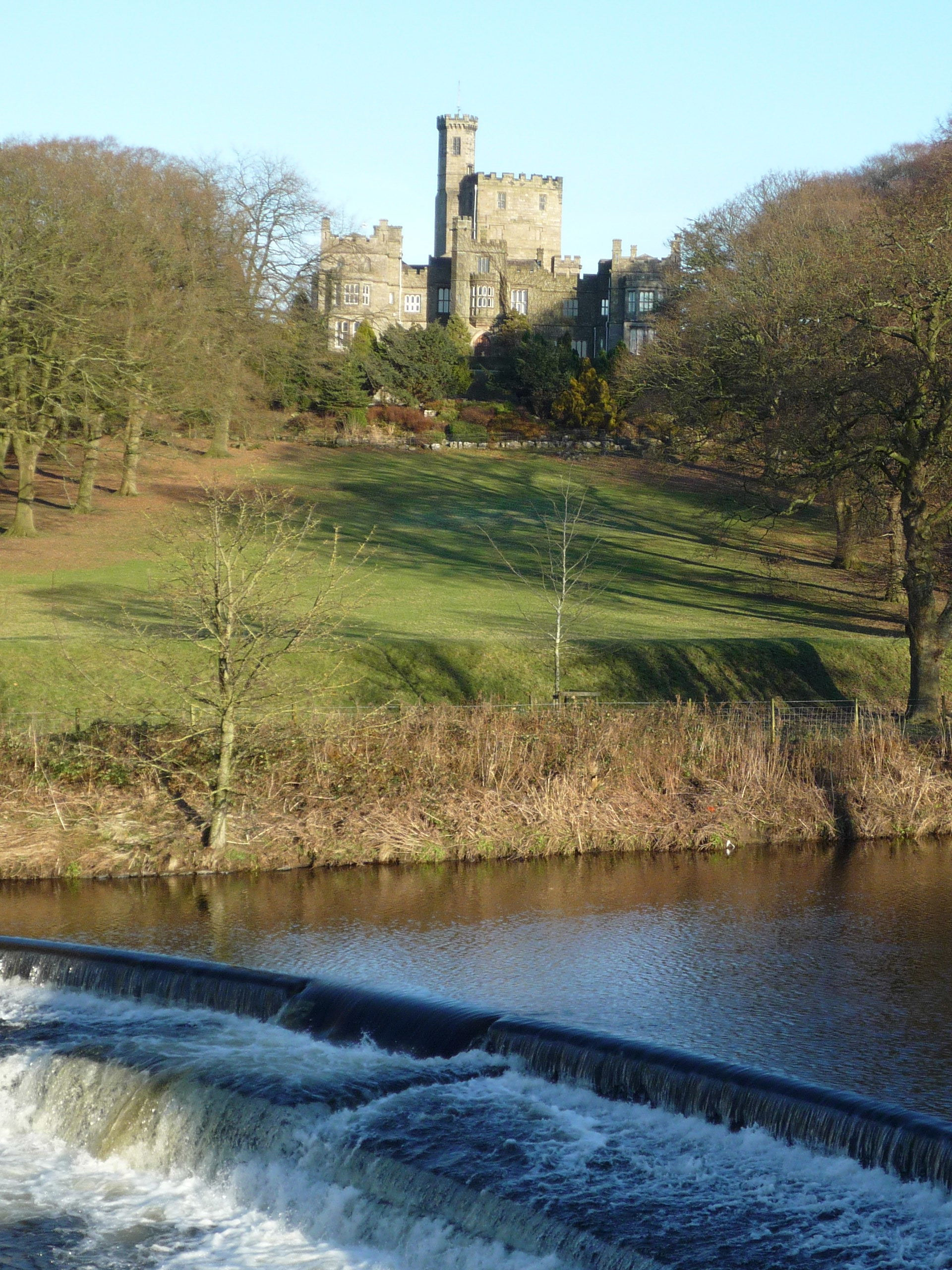
Hornby Castle in 2007

He was elected at the 1895 general election as the Member of Parliament (MP) for the Lancaster division of Lancashire. He had been approached in 1893 to stand for Lancaster, but a local meeting selected someone else, and Foster withdrew. However, in August that year another local meeting asked him to stand, and an announcement was made to that effect, but he was not formally adopted as a candidate until 29 June 1895.

After his victory on 19 July 1895, an election petition was lodged, alleging that Foster and his election agents were guilty of "bribery, treating and other corrupt practices". The full list of 117 charges (of which 32 were struck out by the judges) included allegations included 26 cases of treating, 14 of bribery, 13 prohibited persons voting, and that Foster had offered voters employment at his mills in Queensbury. In the hearings at Lancaster Castle, Foster denied the charges, telling the court that at a meeting where his record as an employer had been attacked, he had said that work was available at the mills. Judgment was delivered on 24 January, when all the charges against Foster were dismissed and the petitioners ordered to bear his costs. The crucial issue had been when Foster became a candidate; if the court had found that he was adopted earlier, then his expenses in promoting the Conservative Party in Lancaster before June 1895 should have been included in his election return, although his agent said that this would not have pushed his total expenditure over the limit of £1,400.

Foster held the Lancaster seat until his defeat at the 1900 general election by the narrow margin of 44 votes (0.4% of the total). He stood again in 1906 but was defeated again, this time by a wider margin of 884 votes (7.2%).

== Personal life ==
On 5 February 1879 Foster married Henrietta Warneford (1853–1912), the daughter of Canon John Henry Warneford of Warneford Place in Wiltshire (which he inherited from his cousin, Lady Wetherell Warneford) and All Saints Vicarage in Halifax. Together, they were the parents of:

- William John Foster (1879–1879), who died in infancy.
- Henry Cyril Warneford Foster (b. 1893)
- Henrietta Marjory Foster
- Gladys Edith Foster
- Hermione Lilian Foster

Foster died on 27 March 1908, aged 60. His funeral was held in Hornby, and a special train brought the Lord Mayor and other local dignitaries from Bradford. The funeral was also attended by Lancaster's MP Norval Helme, and its Lord Mayor. Over 200 wreaths were sent.

Parliament of the United Kingdom
Preceded by James Williamson	Member of Parliament for Lancaster; 1895 – 1900	Succeeded by Norval Helme
