= Edward Matthew Fenwick =

British Liberal politician

Member of Parliament for Lancaster
- In office 13 April 1864 – 23 April 1866 Serving with Henry Schneider (1865–1866); Samuel Gregson (1864–1865)
- Preceded by: William Garnett; Samuel Gregson
- Succeeded by: Constituency disenfranchised

Personal details
- Born: Edward Matthew Reid; 1812
- Died: 16 October 1877 (aged 64–65) Burrow Hall, Burrow-with-Burrow, Lancashire, England
- Party: Liberal
- Spouse: Sarah Fenwick Bowen (m. 1841)
- Children: Two
- Parent(s): Edward James Reid; Caroline Cuddon

Edward Matthew Fenwick (1812 – 16 October 1877), also known as Edward Matthew Reid, was a British Liberal Party politician.

Fenwick was the second son of Edward James and Caroline (née Cuddon) Reid. At some point he changed his name by Royal Licence from Reid to Fenwick. In 1841, he married Sarah Fenwick Bowen, daughter of Thomas Fenwick, and they had at least two children: Thomas Fenwick Fenwick (1842–1907), and Robert Fenwick Fenwick (c. 1845–1868).

Fenwick was elected Liberal MP for Lancaster at a by-election in 1864—caused by the resignation of William Garnett—and held the seat until 1866 when he was unseated for corruption. The seat was later disenfranchised under the Reform Act 1867.

Fenwick was also a Justice of the Peace for Lancashire, Yorkshire and Westmorland, and, in 1865, Deputy Lieutenant for Lancaster.

Parliament of the United Kingdom
Preceded by William Garnett; Samuel Gregson	Member of Parliament for Lancaster; 1864–1866; With: Henry Schneider (1865–1866); Samuel Gregson (1864–1865)	Constituency disenfranchised
