= Robert Baynes Armstrong =

British politician

Robert Baynes Amstrong

Member of Parliament for Lancaster
- In office 9 March 1848 – 21 February 1853 Serving with Samuel Gregson (1852–1853); Thomas Greene (1848–1852)
- Preceded by: Samuel Gregson; Thomas Greene
- Succeeded by: Samuel Gregson; Thomas Greene

Personal details
- Born: 1785
- Died: 15 January 1869 (aged 83)
- Party: Radical

Robert Baynes Armstrong (1785 – 15 January 1869) was a British Radical politician.

Armstrong was elected Radical MP for Lancaster at a 1848—caused by the unseating of Samuel Gregson due to bribery—and held the seat until 1853, when his win at the 1852 general election was too declared void due to corruption and bribery.

Parliament of the United Kingdom
| Preceded by Samuel Gregson; Thomas Greene | Member of Parliament for Lancaster; 1848–1853; With: Samuel Gregson (1852–1853); Thomas Greene (1848–1852) | Succeeded by Samuel Gregson; Thomas Greene |
