= William Garnett (politician) =

British Conservative Party politician (1818 - 1873)

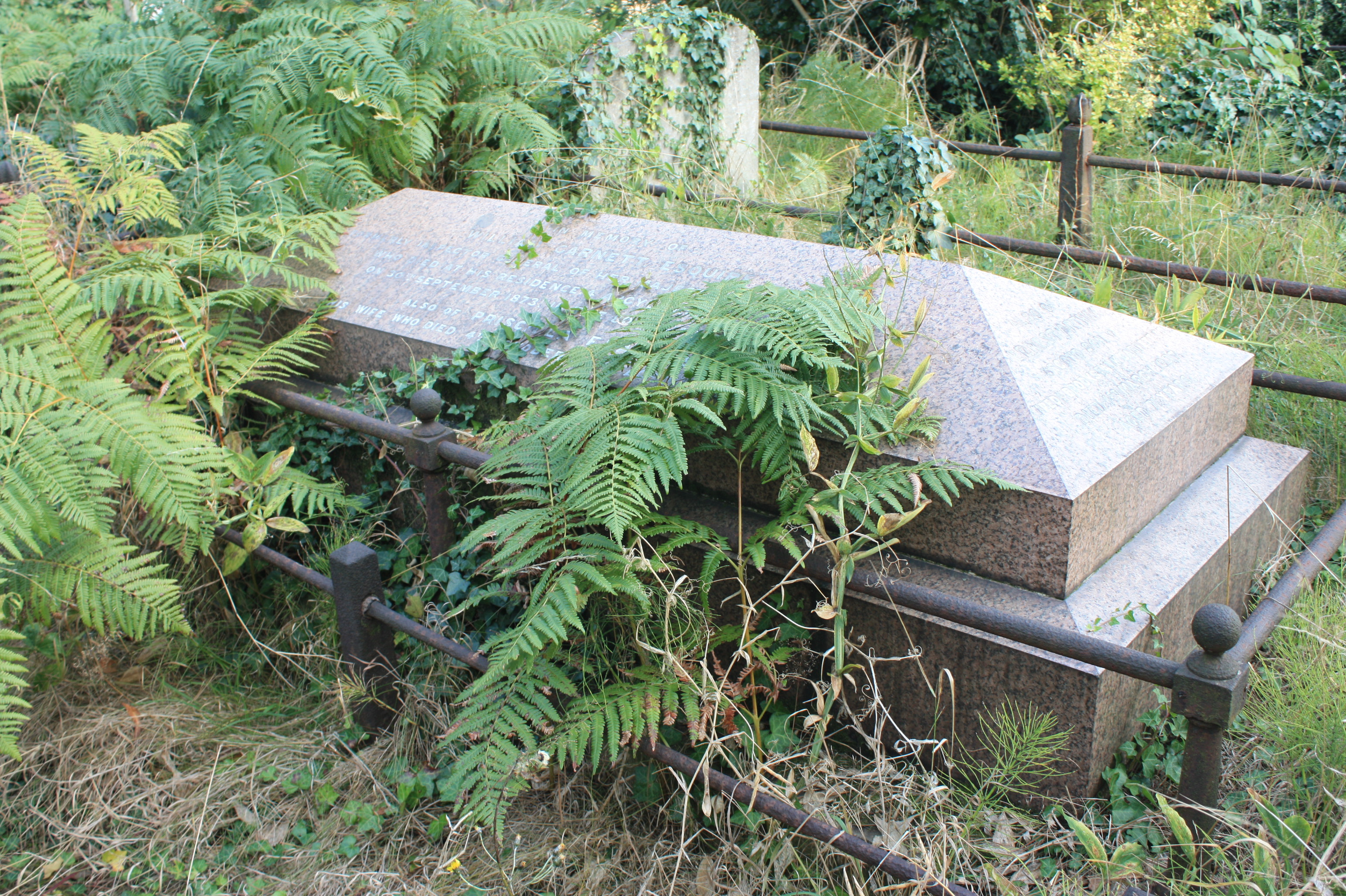
The grave of William Garnett MP, Brompton Cemetery

William James Garnett (10 July 1818 – 15 September 1873) was a British Conservative Party politician from Bleasdale in Lancashire. He sat in the House of Commons from 1857 to 1864.

== Life ==
His father, William Garnett, a cotton merchant of Lark Hill, Salford, had acquired a lease of the manor or forest of Bleasdale from the Crown and converted wild lands into meadow and pasture. He had built Bleasdale Tower and served as High Sheriff of Lancashire in 1843.

William James bought Quernmore Park c.1842 and inherited the Bleasdale estate on the death of his father in 1863. He was appointed as a Deputy Lieutenant of Lancashire in 1852, and was elected at the 1857 general election as a Member of Parliament (MP) for the borough of Lancaster. He was re-elected in 1859, and held the seat until his resignation on 6 April 1864 by becoming Steward of the Manor of Northstead.

He is buried in Brompton Cemetery towards the north-east.

== Family ==
Garnett married Frances Ann, the daughter of the Revd Henry Hale of King's Walden, Hertfordshire. He lived at Waddow Hall and was a relation-by-marriage of David Syme through his wife Annabella née Johnson. He was succeeded by his son William, who was High Sheriff of Lancashire in 1879.

Parliament of the United Kingdom
Preceded by Thomas Greene; Samuel Gregson	Member of Parliament for Lancaster; 1857 – 1864; With: Samuel Gregson	Succeeded by Edward Matthew Fenwick; Samuel Gregson
