= Norval Helme =

British politician (1849 - 1932)

Norval Helme

Sir Norval Watson Helme (22 September 1849 – 6 March 1932) was an English businessman and Liberal Party politician from Lancaster. He held a series of local political offices before winning a seat in the House of Commons in 1900.

Helme was the son of James Helme, from Lancaster. He was educated at the Lancaster Royal Grammar School, and entered his father's business James Helme and Company, whose Halton Mills manufactured oilcloth, baize and leathercloth. By 1900, he was the senior partner of the company.

He served for many years as a member of Lancaster City Council, becoming an alderman, and served as Mayor of Lancaster from 1896 to 1897. When Lancashire County Council was created in 1889, he was elected to represent the city of Lancaster, and served on the County Council until at least 1900, having been returned unopposed at each election.

At the 1900 general election Helme was elected as the Member of Parliament (MP) for the Lancaster division of Lancashire, defeating by only 44 votes the sitting Conservative MP William Henry Foster. He was re-elected in 1906 with an increased majority of 884 votes (7.2%) over Foster, and held the seat at both the January and December elections in 1910. He was knighted in July 1912. However, at the 1918, Helme did not receive the Coalition Coupon, and was defeated by the Coalition Conservative candidate Sir Archibald Hunter.

Parliament of the United Kingdom
Preceded by William Henry Foster	Member of Parliament for Lancaster; 1900 – 1918	Succeeded by Sir Archibald Hunter
