= Nicholas Monck =

British bishop

The Right Reverend Nicholas Monck
- Bishop of Hereford
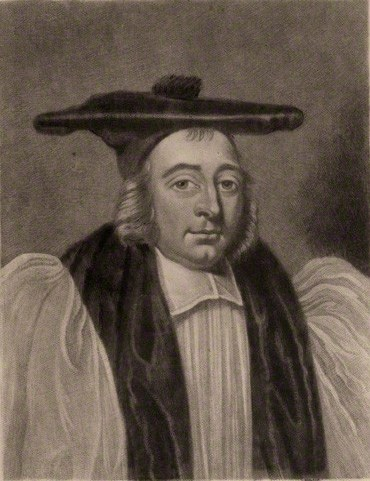
- Church: Church of England
- Diocese: Diocese of London
- Installed: 1660
- Predecessor: Vacant
- Successor: Herbert Croft
- Other posts: Provost of Eton

Orders
- Ordination: 1 December 1660
- Consecration: 6 January 1661 by Gilbert Sheldon

Personal details
- Born: c. 1610 Potheridge, Merton, Devon
- Died: 17 December 1661
- Denomination: Anglican
- Spouse: Susannah Payne
- Education: Wadham College, Oxford

Arms of Monck of Potheridge, Devon: Gules, a chevron between three lion's heads erased argent

Nicholas Monck (c. 1610 – 7 December 1661) was a Bishop of Hereford and Provost of Eton College, both royal appointments made by King Charles II following the 1660 Restoration of the Monarchy which was largely affected by his elder brother George Monck, 1st Duke of Albemarle (1608–1670), KG. Nicholas Monck was "a great assistant in the Restoration to his brother".

== Origins ==
He was born in 1610 at Potheridge in the parish of Merton, Devonshire, the third son of Sir Thomas Monck (1570–1627), Knight, of Potheridge, where his ancestors had been seated for at least 18 generations in an unbroken male line. His mother was Elizabeth Smith, a daughter (by his first marriage) of Sir George Smith (died 1619) of Madworthy, near Exeter, Devon, a merchant who served as a Member of Parliament for Exeter in 1604, was three times Mayor of Exeter and was Exeter's richest citizen, possessing 25 manors. Elizabeth's half-sister by their father's second marriage was Grace Smith, wife of the heroic Civil War Royalist commander Sir Bevil Grenville (1596-1643) of Bideford in Devon and Stowe, Kilkhampton in Cornwall, killed in action at the Battle of Lansdowne (1643) and mother of John Grenville, 1st Earl of Bath (1628–1701), who greatly assisted his half-first cousin George Monck, 1st Duke of Albemarle (1608–1670) in effecting the Restoration of the Monarchy in 1660.

== Career ==
In 1629 he matriculated at Wadham College, Oxford and graduated B.A. on 3 March 1630-1, and M.A. on 30 October 1633. Instead of entering the army like his two surviving elder brothers, he took holy orders, as was usual for younger sons of the gentry. From 1640 he served as Rector of Langtree, a parish near Potheridge, and was given the Rectory of Kilkhampton in Cornwall by his half-cousin Sir John Grenville (later 1st Earl of Bath). After 1646 he obtained the small rectory of Plymtree in Devon, having in 1642 married the daughter of the then rector, whose family held the advowson, and this was confirmed to him by General Monck's influence with Cromwell. During the Civil War his sympathies certainly leaned to the royalist side, and in 1653 he was presented by his kinsman, Sir John Granville (later 1st Earl of Bath), to the valuable living of Kilhampton in Cornwall, worth about £260 a year.

After Cromwell's death Grenville sent 'the honest clergyman' up to London, where he received through George Monck's brother-in-law, Thomas Clarges, instructions to go to Scotland and ascertain his brother's intentions. Nicholas therefore sailed for Edinburgh, in August 1659, on the ostensible errand of arranging a marriage for one of his daughters. He found the general engaged with a council of officers, but confided his mission to the general's chaplain, John Price, who was in the confidence of the royalist party. From Price, Monck received every encouragement. The next day the brothers met, and various accounts are given of their interview, but all agree that the general refused to commit himself as to his future conduct.

After the Restoration, Nicholas was nominated by King Charles II as Provost of Eton College, on the recommendation of Granville. There was no pretence of election on the part of the Fellows of Eton College, who much incensed by the king's arbitrary proceeding, refused to make an entry of the appointment in the College register. A copy of the royal letter, dated 7 July 1660, nominating Monck is extant in Eton's College Library. Most of the puritan fellows resigned or were ejected, and 'new regulations were drawn up by the new provost and fellows, the former's stipend being fixed at £500 a year, besides 'wood, capons, 20 dozen of candles, and 20 loads of hay.' On 1 August 1660 Nicholas was created Doctor of Divinity at Oxford University, and on 1 December 1660, he was appointed by the king as Bishop of Hereford, a see which had been vacant for fourteen years. He was to hold his provostship in addition for two years. He was consecrated on 6 January 1660-1 in Westminster Abbey by the Archbishop of York, but lived to enjoy his new dignity only for eleven months.

== Marriage and children ==
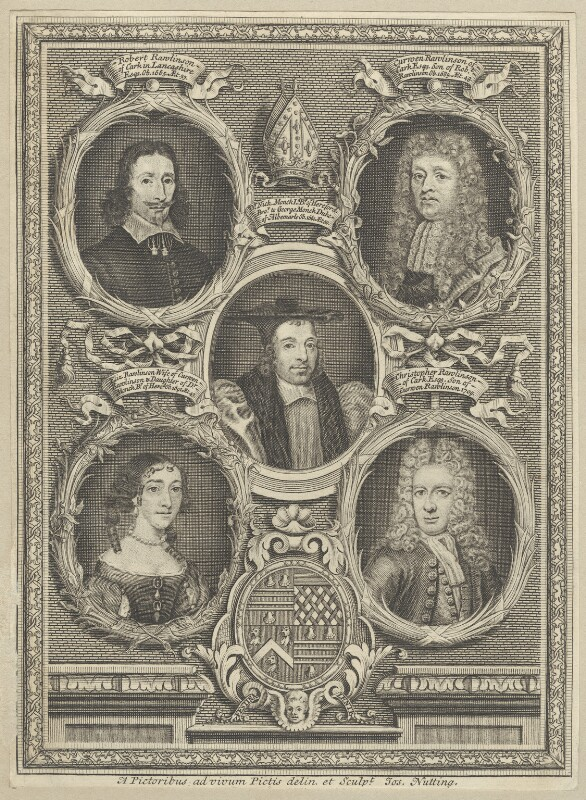
Engraving of Nicholas Monck and the Rawlinson Family, by Joseph Nutting, early 18th century

In 1642 he married Susannah Payne, a daughter of Rev. Thomas Payne, Rector of Plymtree in Devon, and widow of Christopher Trosse. By his wife he had children as follows:

- Nicholas Monck, son and heir apparent, who died young;
- Mary Monck, co-heiress, who married Arthur Fairwell of Westminster,
- Elizabeth Monck, co-heiress, who married Curwen Rawlinson of Carke Hall, Cartmell, Lancashire. Her monument, erected by her son the antiquary Christopher Rawlinson (1677–1733), survives in St. Mary's Church, Cartmell, and describes her father Nicholas Monck as "a great assistant in the Restoration to his brother".

== Death and burial ==
He died on 17 December 1661, aged 51, at his lodgings in Old Palace Yard, Palace of Westminster, and was buried on the 20th in Westminster Abbey, his brother the Duke of Albemarle having attended the funeral as chief mourner. In 1723 his grandson Christopher Rawlinson erected in his memory a pyramidical monument in black and white marble in St. Edmund's Chapel, Westminster Abbey.

== Sources ==
- Bradley, Emily Tennyson (1894). "Monck, Nicholas" . In Lee, Sidney (ed.). Dictionary of National Biography. Vol. 38. London: Smith, Elder & Co. pp. 162–163.
- Knighton, C. S. (September 2004). "Monck, Nicholas (c.1610–1661)". Oxford Dictionary of National Biography. Oxford Dictionary of National Biography (online ed.). Oxford University Press. doi:10.1093/ref:odnb/18941. (Subscription, Wikipedia Library access or UK public library membership required.)

Church of England titles
Vacant Title last held by George Coke	Bishop of Hereford; 1660–1661	Succeeded by Herbert Croft
