= William Heysham (politician) =

English politician (1666–1716)

William Heysham (1666 – 13 June 1716) was an English politician and merchant. He sat as MP for Lancaster from 1705 till his death on 13 June 1716.

He was baptised on 27 January 1666. He was the third son of Giles Heysham. He was the brother of Robert Heysham. On 3 September 1687, he married Elizabeth, the daughter of Humphrey Brockden and they had three sons and one daughters. His son William succeeded him as Lancaster MP.
