= Christopher Rawlinson (antiquary) =

English antiquary (1677–1733)

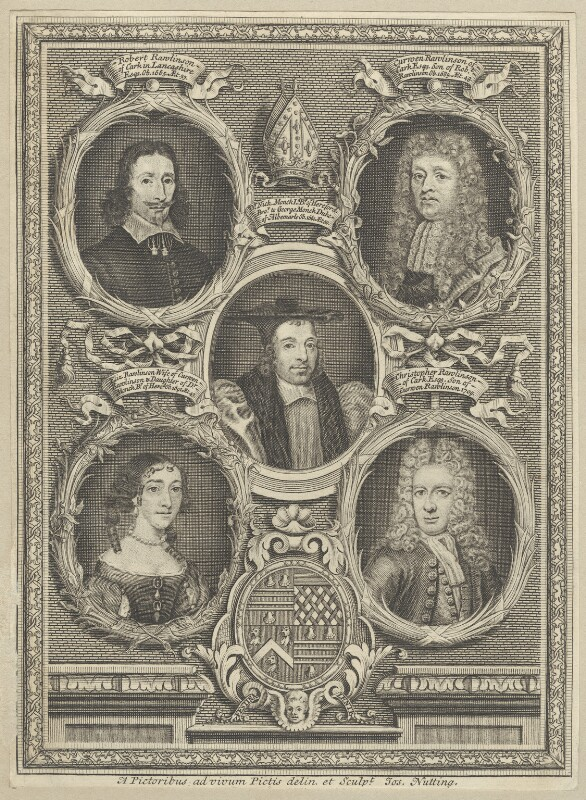
Engraving of Nicholas Monck and the Rawlinson Family, By Joseph Nutting, early 18th century. Christopher Rawlinson is at bottom right, his mother at bottom left, his father at top right, his paternal grandfather Robert Rawlinson of Carke at top left and his maternal grandfather Nicholas Monck, Bishop of Hereford in centre. The Oval escutcheon below shows arms quarterly of four: 1&4: Gules, two bars gemelles between three escallops argent (Rawlinson); 2: Fretty, a chief (?); 3: Gules, a chevron between three lion's heads erased argent (Monck)

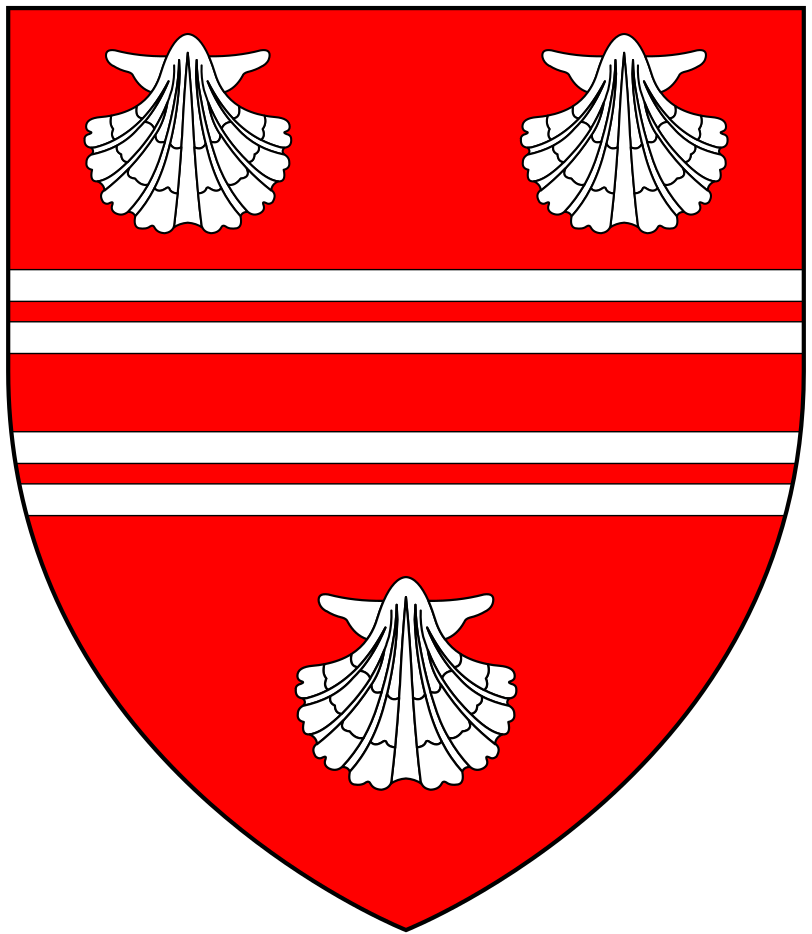
Arms of Rawlinson: Gules, two bars gemelles between three escallops argent

Christopher Rawlinson (1677–1733) of Carke Hall in Cartmell, Lancashire, was an English antiquary.

== Origins ==
He was born on 13 June 1677 at Springfield in Essex, the second son of Curwen Rawlinson of Carke Hall in Cartmell, Lancashire, a Member of Parliament for Lancaster in 1688, by his wife Elizabeth Monck, a daughter and co-heiress of Nicholas Monck, Bishop of Hereford, a younger brother of George Monck, 1st Duke of Albemarle (1608–1670) KG.

== Career ==
He matriculated at Queen's College, Oxford, on 14 June 1695. He inherited his father's estates. In 1723 he erected to the memory of his grandfather Nicholas Monck, Bishop of Hereford, a pyramidical monument in black and white marble in St. Edmund's Chapel, Westminster Abbey.

== Works ==
He devoted himself to Anglo-Saxon studies and in 1698 published (with assistance from Edward Thwaites), the Saxon text of the Consolation of Philosophy by Boethius, from a transcript at Oxford made by Francis Junius. It was printed with the Junian font. Rawlinson had made valuable collections for the history of Lancashire, Westmoreland, and Cumberland, all of which have probably perished. The antiquary Sir Daniel Fleming had, however, copied extracts from the part relating to Westmoreland, which were deposited in the collection of manuscripts at Rydal Hall, and were used in about 1777 by Richard Burn and Joseph Nicolson for their work Westmoreland and Cumberland.

== Death, burial & legacy ==
He died unmarried and intestate on 8 January 1733 in Holborn Row, London and was buried in the abbey church of St Albans, Hertfordshire. His portrait, engraved by Joseph Nutting, with those of other members of his family, is in the Bodleian Library, Oxford. His estates passed to his cousins, the issue of his father's sisters Anne and Katherine. Following his death the furniture of Carke Hall was sold by auction and his manuscripts were at the same time sold for a few pennies in bundles to the villagers.
