= John Joseph O'Neill (British politician) =

British politician (1888–1953)

John Joseph O'Neill (1888 – 20 April 1953) was a Liberal Party politician in England.

At the 1918 general election, he stood as a candidate in the 2-seat Preston constituency, where he fell only 485 votes short of gaining the second seat. He did not stand again until the 1923 general election, gaining Lancaster from the sitting Conservative MP, John Singleton.

However, O'Neill's time in the House of Commons was short. At the 1924 general election, he was defeated by the Conservative Gerald Strickland. He never stood again.

Parliament of the United Kingdom
| Preceded by John Edward Singleton | Member of Parliament for Lancaster; 1923 – 1924 | Succeeded by Gerald Strickland |
