= Edward Thwaites =

English scholar of the Anglo-Saxon language

Edward Thwaites (Thwaytes) (baptised 1661–1711) was an English scholar of the Anglo-Saxon language. According to David C. Douglas he was "one of the most inspiring teachers which Oxford has ever produced".

== Life ==
Thwaites was the son of William Thwaites of Crosby-Ravensworth, Westmoreland, born at Ravensworth. After schooling at Kendal, Thwaites was admitted batler of The Queen's College, Oxford, on 18 September 1689, and graduated B.A. in 1694 and M.A. in 1697. Before he took his master's degree Thwaites had come under the influence of George Hickes, who came to live at Gloucester Green in Oxford in 1696. There was already a group of Anglo-Saxon students at Queen's, among whom Thwaites was a leader.

Thwaites was ordained priest on 2 January 1698, and shortly afterwards was elected fellow and lecturer of his college, to teach Anglo-Saxon. The difficulty which he found in procuring sufficient copies of William Somner's Anglo-Saxon Dictionary (1659) led to the issue of another edition, with additions by Thomas Benson, in 1701. In 1699, he was appointed dean of his college; he tried to improve college discipline, and had his windows broken. He was promoted to be lecturer in moral philosophy in 1704, and he became Regius Professor of Greek in March 1708. He gave his inaugural lecture on 12 May 1708.

Thomas Hearne, once a friend, noted his decline into consumption. During 1708 Thwaites was appointed Whyte's professor of moral philosophy. Hearne speaks of Thwaites as reduced by 1711 to a skeleton; he was suffering from a complication of disorders, and Charles Bernard, royal surgeon, was impressed by his heroism during an operation to amputate his leg; he is said to have mentioned the case to Queen Anne, who made a grant of money. Thwaites died at Littlemore on 12 December 1711, and was buried in Iffley. His monument is figured in John Le Neve's Monumenta Anglicana (1717, v. 226). There is a portrait of Thwaites as St. Gregory, in an initial G, in Elizabeth Elstob's English-Saxon Homily on the Birthday of St. Gregory.

== Works ==
His first project seems to have been to edit, with a commentary and translation, King Alfred's Anglo-Saxon version of the Universal History of Orosius, and this plan had Hickes's approval. He substituted, in the course of 1697, an edition of Dionysius Periegetes. Before the close of 1698 Thwaites dedicated to George Hickes his Heptateuchus, Liber Job et Evangelium Nicodemi Anglo-Saxonicae: this act of loyalty by Thwaites to the nonjuror Hickes was at some risk to his position, and attracted attention from the meddling Arthur Charlett. The same year saw an edition of Alfred's version of Boethius (Consolationis Philosophiae lib. v.) by Thwaites's pupil at Queen's, Christopher Rawlinson, who acknowledges help from his tutor. Thwaites had already begun in a modest fashion to assist Hickes in the preparation of his Thesaurus, which was published in 1705.

In 1708 he had privately printed his Notae in Anglo-Saxonum nummos (Oxford). The coins described were from the collection of Sir Andrew Fountaine, another Oxford contemporary, friend, and fellow contributor to Hickes's Thesaurus. In 1709 appeared at Oxford an edition of Ephrem the Syrian. In 1711 Thwaites returned to Anglo-Saxon, dedicating to his old pupil, Christopher Rawlinson, his Grammatica Anglo-Saxonica, ex Hickesanio Linguarum Septentrionalium Thesauro excerpta (Oxford).

== Family ==
A younger brother, James Thwaites, graduated M.A. from Queen's College, Oxford, in 1708, and died in orders at Lambeth on 24 July 1755.
