= Lancaster (constituency) =

Parliamentary constituency in the United Kingdom, 1885–1997

- Former county constituency for the House of Commons
- Lancaster in Lancashire, showing boundaries used from 1974–1983
- County: Lancashire

1885–1997
- Seats: One
- Created from: North Lancashire
- Replaced by: Lancaster and Wyre, Morecambe and Lunesdale, Fylde

1523–1867
- Seats: Two
- Type of constituency: Borough constituency
- Created from: Lancashire
- Replaced by: North Lancashire

1295–1376
- Type of constituency: Borough constituency

Lancaster was a constituency of the House of Commons of the Parliament of England then of the Parliament of Great Britain from 1707 to 1800 and of the Parliament of the United Kingdom from 1801 to 1867, centred on the historic city of Lancaster in north-west England. It was represented by two Members of Parliament until the constituency was disenfranchised for corruption in 1867.

Under the Redistribution of Seats Act 1885, Lancaster was re-established for the 1885 general election as a county constituency. It then returned one Member of Parliament (MP) to the House of Commons of the Parliament of the United Kingdom, with elections held under the first-past-the-post system. This constituency in turn was abolished when it was largely replaced by the new Lancaster and Wyre constituency for the 1997 general election.

== History ==
Lancaster returned Members to Parliament between 1295 and 1331 but is not known to have done so again, on the grounds of the poverty of the town's burgesses, until the election of William Banester in 1523.

Representation was reduced during the protectorate: Lancaster was not represented in the Barebones Parliament and sent only one Member to the first and second Protectorate Parliaments.

The two Member constituency was disenfranchised in 1867 for corruption and representation not restored until 1885 as a one Member constituency. The constituency was abolished in 1997 and replaced by the constituency of Lancaster and Wyre.

== Boundaries ==
1885–1918: The Borough of Lancaster, the Sessional Divisions of Garstang and Hornby, and part of the Sessional Division of South Lonsdale.

1918–1950: The Boroughs of Lancaster and Morecambe, the Urban Districts of Heysham and Preesall, the Rural District of Garstang, and part of the Rural District of Lancaster.

1950–1983: The Borough of Lancaster, the Urban District of Carnforth, the Rural District of Lunesdale, and in the Rural District of Lancaster the parishes of Ashton with Stodday, Cockerham, Elllel, Heaton with Oxcliffe, Middleton, Overton, Over Wyresdale, Scotforth, and Thurnham.

1983–1997: The City of Lancaster wards of Bulk, Castle, Caton, Ellel, Hornby, John O'Gaunt, Scotforth East, Scotforth West, Skerton Central, Skerton East, and Skerton West, and the Borough of Wyre wards of Brock, Calder, Catterall, Duchy, Garstang, Great Eccleston, Pilling, and Wyresdale.

== Members of Parliament ==
=== 1295–1640 ===
| Parliament | First member | Second member |
|---|---|---|
| 1523 | William Banester | ?Lawrence Starkey |
| 1529 | Lawrence Starkey | Richard Southworth |
| 1536 | ? | |
| 1539 | ? | |
| 1542 | ? | |
| 1545 | Sir John Baker | Sir Nicholas Hare |
| 1547 | Sir Thomas Chaloner | Stephen Vaughan died and repl. by Jan 1552 by William Ward |
| 1553 (Mar) | John Caryll | Thomas Carus |
| 1553 (Oct) | Sir Thomas Tresham | Thomas Carus |
| 1554 (Apr) | John Heywood | George Felton |
| 1554 (Nov) | Richard Baker | Richard Weston |
| 1555 | Thomas Carus | Thomas Hungate |
| 1558 | Sir Clement Heigham | William Rice |
| 1559 (Jan) | Sir Thomas Benger | William Fleetwood |
| 1562–1563 | John Hales | William Fleetwood |
| 1571 | Henry Sadler | Miles Sandys |
| 1572 | Thomas Sadler | Henry Sadler |
| 1584 (Nov) | Henry Sadler | Thomas Gerard |
| 1586 | Thomas Gerard | Henry Sadler |
| 1588 | Roger Dalton | John Atherton |
| 1593 | John Preston | John Awdeley |
| 1597 (Oct) | Sir Thomas Hesketh | Edward Hubberd |
| 1601 (Oct) | Sir Jerome Bowes | Sir Carew Reynell |
| 1604 | Sir Thomas Hesketh, died and repl. 1605 by Sir Thomas Howard | Thomas Fanshawe |
| 1614 | Thomas Fanshawe | William Fanshawe |
| 1621 | Sir Humphrey May | Thomas Fanshawe |
| 1624 | Sir Humphrey May, sat for Leicester and repl. by John Selden | Thomas Fanshawe |
| 1625 | Sir Humphrey May | Sir Thomas Fanshawe |
| 1626 | Sir Thomas Fanshawe | Thomas Jermyn |
| 1628 | Sir Thomas Fanshawe | Francis Bindlosse |
| 1629–1640 | No Parliaments summoned | |

==== 1640–1867 ====
| Year | First member | First party | Second member | Second party |
|---|---|---|---|---|
| April 1640 | Roger Kirkby | | John Harrison | |
| November 1640 | Thomas Fanshawe | Royalist | John Harrison | Royalist |
| September 1642 | Fanshawe disabled from sitting – seat vacant | | John Harrison | Royalist |
| September 1643 | Fanshawe disabled from sitting – seat vacant | | Harrison disabled from sitting – seat vacant | |
| 1645 | Thomas Fell | | Sir Robert Bindlosse | |
| December 1648 | Thomas Fell | | Bindlosse excluded in Pride's Purge – seat vacant | |
| 1653 | Lancaster was unrepresented in the Barebones Parliament | | | |
| 1654 | Major Henry Porter | | Lancaster had only one seat in the First and Second Parliaments of the Protectorate | |
| 1656 | Major Henry Porter | | Lancaster had only one seat in the First and Second Parliaments of the Protectorate | |
| January 1659 | Henry Porter, junior | | Colonel William West | |
| May 1659 | Thomas Fell | | One seat vacant | |
| April 1660 | Sir Gilbert Gerard | | William West | |
| 1661 | Richard Kirkby | | Sir John Harrison | |
| 1669 | Richard Kirkby | | Richard Harrison | |
| 1679 | Richard Kirkby | | William Spencer | |
| 1685 | Roger Kirkby | | Henry Crispe | |
| January 1689 | Curwen Rawlinson | | Thomas Preston | |
| November 1689 | Roger Kirkby | | Thomas Preston | |
| 1697 | Roger Kirkby | | Fitton Gerard | |
| 1698 | Roger Kirkby | | Robert Heysham | |
| 1702 | Sir William Lowther | | Robert Heysham | |
| 1705 | William Heysham | | Robert Heysham | |
| 1715 | William Heysham | | Dodding Bradyll | Whig |
| 1716 | William Heysham, junior | | Dodding Bradyll | Whig |
| 1722 | William Heysham, junior | | Sir Thomas Lowther | |
| 1727 | Christopher Tower | | Sir Thomas Lowther | |
| 1734 | Robert Fenwick | | Sir Thomas Lowther | |
| 1745 | Robert Fenwick | | Francis Reynolds | |
| 1747 | Edward Marton | | Francis Reynolds | |
| 1758 | (Sir) George Warren | | Francis Reynolds | |
| 1773 | (Sir) George Warren | | Lord Richard Cavendish | |
| 1780 | Wilson Braddyll | | Abraham Rawlinson | |
| 1784 | Captain Francis Reynolds | | Abraham Rawlinson | |
| 1786 | Sir George Warren | | Abraham Rawlinson | |
| 1790 | Sir George Warren | | John Dent | |
| 1796 | Richard Penn | | John Dent | |
| 1802 | Alexander Hamilton, 10th Duke of Hamilton | Whig | John Dent | |
| 1806 | John Fenton-Cawthorne | Tory | John Dent | |
| 1807 | Peter Patten | | John Dent | |
| 1812 | John Fenton-Cawthorne | Tory | Gabriel Doveton | Whig |
| 1818 | John Gladstone | Tory | Gabriel Doveton | Whig |
| 1820 | John Fenton-Cawthorne | Tory | Gabriel Doveton | Whig |
| 1824 | John Fenton-Cawthorne | Tory | Thomas Greene | Tory |
| 1831 | Patrick Maxwell Stewart | Whig | Thomas Greene | Tory |
| 1834 | Patrick Maxwell Stewart | Whig | Thomas Greene | Conservative |
| 1837 | George Marton | Conservative | Thomas Greene | Conservative |
| 1847 | Samuel Gregson | Whig | Thomas Greene | Peelite |
| 1848 | Robert Baynes Armstrong | Radical | Thomas Greene | Peelite |
| 1852 | Robert Baynes Armstrong | Radical | Samuel Gregson | Whig |
| 1853 | Thomas Greene | Peelite | Samuel Gregson | Whig |
| 1857 | William Garnett | Conservative | Samuel Gregson | Whig |
| 1859 | William Garnett | Conservative | Samuel Gregson | Liberal |
| 1864 | Edward Matthew Fenwick | Liberal | Samuel Gregson | Liberal |
| 1865 | Edward Matthew Fenwick | Liberal | Henry Schneider | Liberal |
| 1867 | Constituency disfranchised for corruption | | | |

=== Lancaster county constituency ===
==== 1885–1997 ====
| Election | Member | Party |
|---|---|---|
| 1885 | Constituency re-created | |
| 1885 | George Marton | Conservative |
| 1886 | James Williamson | Liberal |
| 1895 | William Foster | Conservative |
| 1900 | Norval Helme | Liberal |
| 1918 | Archibald Hunter | Coalition Conservative |
| 1922 | John Singleton | Conservative |
| 1923 | John O'Neill | Liberal |
| 1924 | Gerald Strickland | Conservative |
| 1928 by-election | Robert Tomlinson | Liberal |
| 1929 | Herwald Ramsbotham | Conservative |
| 1941 by-election | Fitzroy Maclean | Conservative |
| 1959 | Humphry Berkeley | Conservative |
| 1966 | Stan Henig | Labour |
| 1970 | Dame Elaine Kellett-Bowman | Conservative |
| 1997 | constituency abolished: see Lancaster and Wyre | |

== Elections ==
=== Elections in the 1830s ===
General election 1830: Lancaster
| Party | Candidate | Votes | % |
|---|---|---|---|
| Tory | Thomas Greene | 363 | 50.8 |
| Tory | John Fenton-Cawthorne | 239 | 33.5 |
| Whig | Robert Hyde Greg | 112 | 15.7 |
| Majority | | 127 | 17.8 |
| Turnout | | 390 | 9.8 |
| Registered electors | | c. 4,000 | |
| Tory hold | | | |
| Tory hold | | | |

Fenton-Cawthorne's death caused a by-election.

By-election, 14 March 1831: Lancaster
| Party | Candidate | Votes | % |
|---|---|---|---|
| Whig | Patrick Maxwell Stewart | Unopposed | |
| Registered electors | | c. 4,000 | |
| Whig gain from Tory | | | |

General election 1831: Lancaster
| Party | Candidate | Votes | % |
|---|---|---|---|
| Tory | Thomas Greene | Unopposed | |
| Whig | Patrick Maxwell Stewart | Unopposed | |
| Registered electors | | c. 4,000 | |
| Tory hold | | | |
| Whig gain from Tory | | | |

General election 1832: Lancaster
| Party | Candidate | Votes | % |
|---|---|---|---|
| Tory | Thomas Greene | Unopposed | |
| Whig | Patrick Maxwell Stewart | Unopposed | |
| Registered electors | | 1,109 | |
| Tory hold | | | |
| Whig hold | | | |

General election 1835: Lancaster
| Party | Candidate | Votes | % |
|---|---|---|---|
| Conservative | Thomas Greene | Unopposed | |
| Whig | Patrick Maxwell Stewart | Unopposed | |
| Registered electors | | 1,207 | |
| Conservative hold | | | |
| Whig hold | | | |

General election 1837: Lancaster
| Party | Candidate | Votes | % |
|---|---|---|---|
| Conservative | Thomas Greene | 614 | 31.6 |
| Conservative | George Marton | 527 | 27.2 |
| Whig | Patrick Maxwell Stewart | 453 | 23.3 |
| Whig | William Rathbone Greg | 347 | 17.9 |
| Majority | | 74 | 3.9 |
| Turnout | | 989 | 85.2 |
| Registered electors | | 1,161 | |
| Conservative hold | | | |
| Conservative gain from Whig | | | |

=== Elections in the 1840s ===
General election 1841: Lancaster
| Party | Candidate | Votes | % | ±% |
|---|---|---|---|---|
| Conservative | Thomas Greene | 699 | 37.5 | +5.9 |
| Conservative | George Marton | 594 | 31.8 | +4.6 |
| Whig | John Armstrong | 572 | 30.7 | −10.5 |
| Majority | | 22 | 1.1 | −2.8 |
| Turnout | | 933 (est) | 72.0 (est) | c. −13.2 |
| Registered electors | | 1,296 | | |
| Conservative hold | | Swing | +5.6 | |
| Conservative hold | | Swing | +4.9 | |

General election 1847: Lancaster
| Party | Candidate | Votes | % | ±% |
|---|---|---|---|---|
| Whig | Samuel Gregson | 724 | 35.0 | +4.3 |
| Peelite | Thomas Greene | 721 | 34.9 | −2.6 |
| Conservative | Edward Dodson Salisbury | 621 | 30.1 | −1.7 |
| Turnout | | 1,033 (est) | 75.0 (est) | +3.0 |
| Registered electors | | 1,377 | | |
| Majority | | 103 | 4.9 | N/A |
| Whig gain from Conservative | | Swing | +2.6 | |
| Majority | | 100 | 4.8 | +3.7 |
| Peelite hold | | Swing | −0.9 | |

Gregson's election was declared void on petition due to bribery, causing a by-election.

By-election, 9 March 1848: Lancaster
| Party | Candidate | Votes | % | ±% |
|---|---|---|---|---|
| Radical | Robert Baynes Armstrong | 636 | 50.6 | +15.6 |
| Conservative | Edward Stanley | 620 | 49.4 | −15.6 |
| Majority | | 16 | 1.2 | N/A |
| Turnout | | 1,256 | 91.2 | +16.2 |
| Registered electors | | 1,377 | | |
| Radical gain from Whig | | Swing | +15.6 | |

=== Elections in the 1850s ===
General election 1852: Lancaster
| Party | Candidate | Votes | % | ±% |
|---|---|---|---|---|
| Whig | Samuel Gregson | 699 | 30.0 | −5.0 |
| Radical | Robert Baynes Armstrong | 690 | 29.6 | N/A |
| Peelite | Thomas Greene | 509 | 21.8 | −13.1 |
| Conservative | John Ellis | 432 | 18.5 | −11.6 |
| Turnout | | 1,165 (est) | 83.6 (est) | +8.6 |
| Registered electors | | 1,393 | | |
| Majority | | 9 | 0.4 | +0.3 |
| Whig hold | | Swing | +0.4 | |
| Majority | | 181 | 7.8 | N/A |
| Radical gain from Peelite | | Swing | N/A | |

Armstrong's election was declared void due to corruption and bribery, causing a by-election.

By-election, 12 April 1853: Lancaster
| Party | Candidate | Votes | % | ±% |
|---|---|---|---|---|
| Peelite | Thomas Greene | 686 | 55.3 | +33.5 |
| Radical | John Armstrong | 554 | 44.7 | +15.1 |
| Majority | | 132 | 10.6 | N/A |
| Turnout | | 1,240 | 87.3 (est) | +3.7 |
| Registered electors | | 1,420 | | |
| Peelite gain from Radical | | Swing | +9.2 | |

General election 1857: Lancaster
| Party | Candidate | Votes | % | ±% |
|---|---|---|---|---|
| Whig | Samuel Gregson | 827 | 38.7 | +8.7 |
| Conservative | William Garnett | 773 | 36.2 | +26.9 |
| Conservative | Robert Gladstone | 537 | 25.1 | +15.8 |
| Majority | | 54 | 2.5 | +2.1 |
| Turnout | | 1,069 (est) | 80.5 (est) | −3.1 |
| Registered electors | | 1,328 | | |
| Whig hold | | Swing | −25.7 | |
| Conservative gain from Radical | | Swing | +15.6 | |

General election 1859: Lancaster
| Party | Candidate | Votes | % | ±% |
|---|---|---|---|---|
| Conservative | William Garnett | 660 | 29.1 | −7.1 |
| Liberal | Samuel Gregson | 641 | 28.3 | +8.9 |
| Conservative | William Allen Francis Saunders | 509 | 22.4 | −2.7 |
| Liberal | Edward Matthew Fenwick | 459 | 20.2 | +0.8 |
| Turnout | | 1,135 (est) | 88.1 (est) | +7.6 |
| Registered electors | | 1,288 | | |
| Majority | | 19 | 0.8 | |
| Conservative hold | | Swing | −6.0 | |
| Majority | | 132 | 5.9 | +3.4 |
| Liberal hold | | Swing | +6.9 | |

=== Elections in the 1860s ===
Garnett resigned, causing a by-election.

By-election, 13 April 1864: Lancaster
| Party | Candidate | Votes | % | ±% |
|---|---|---|---|---|
| Liberal | Edward Matthew Fenwick | 682 | 56.5 | +8.0 |
| Conservative | William Allen Francis Saunders | 525 | 43.5 | −8.0 |
| Majority | | 157 | 13.0 | +7.2 |
| Turnout | | 1,207 | 86.6 | −1.5 |
| Registered electors | | 1,394 | | |
| Liberal gain from Conservative | | Swing | +8.0 | |

Gregson's death caused a by-election.

By-election, 20 February 1865: Lancaster
| Party | Candidate | Votes | % | ±% |
|---|---|---|---|---|
| Liberal | Henry Schneider | Unopposed | | |
| Liberal hold | | | | |

General election 1865: Lancaster
| Party | Candidate | Votes | % | ±% |
|---|---|---|---|---|
| Liberal | Edward Matthew Fenwick | 713 | 34.5 | +14.3 |
| Liberal | Henry Schneider | 687 | 33.3 | +5.0 |
| Conservative | Edward Lawrence | 665 | 32.2 | −19.3 |
| Majority | | 22 | 1.1 | −4.8 |
| Turnout | | 1,365 (est) | 93.2 (est) | +5.1 |
| Registered electors | | 1,465 | | |
| Liberal hold | | Swing | +12.0 | |
| Liberal gain from Conservative | | Swing | +7.3 | |

Extensive bribery caused both members to be unseated on 23 April 1866, and the seat to lose its right to return a member of Parliament under the Reform Act 1867. It was incorporated into North Lancashire.

=== Elections in the 1880s ===
General election 1885: Lancaster
| Party | Candidate | Votes | % | ±% |
|---|---|---|---|---|
| Conservative | George Marton | 4,387 | 55.4 | |
| Liberal | James Carlile McCoan | 3,530 | 44.6 | |
| Majority | | 857 | 10.8 | |
| Turnout | | 7,917 | 88.3 | |
| Registered electors | | 8,961 | | |
| Conservative win (new seat) | | | | |

General election 1886: Lancaster
| Party | Candidate | Votes | % | ±% |
|---|---|---|---|---|
| Liberal | James Williamson | 3,886 | 51.3 | +6.7 |
| Conservative | George Marton | 3,691 | 48.7 | −6.7 |
| Majority | | 195 | 2.6 | N/A |
| Turnout | | 7,577 | 84.6 | −3.7 |
| Registered electors | | 8,961 | | |
| Liberal gain from Conservative | | Swing | +6.7 | |

=== Elections in the 1890s ===
General election 1892: Lancaster
| Party | Candidate | Votes | % | ±% |
|---|---|---|---|---|
| Liberal | James Williamson | 4,755 | 53.9 | +2.6 |
| Liberal Unionist | Thomas Storey | 4,075 | 46.1 | −2.6 |
| Majority | | 680 | 7.8 | +5.2 |
| Turnout | | 8,830 | 88.3 | +3.7 |
| Registered electors | | 9,995 | | |
| Liberal hold | | Swing | +2.6 | |

Foster

General election 1895: Lancaster
| Party | Candidate | Votes | % | ±% |
|---|---|---|---|---|
| Conservative | William Henry Foster | 5,028 | 53.4 | +7.3 |
| Liberal | Isaac Saunders Leadam | 4,394 | 46.6 | −7.3 |
| Majority | | 634 | 6.8 | N/A |
| Turnout | | 9,422 | 87.4 | −0.9 |
| Registered electors | | 10,778 | | |
| Conservative gain from Liberal | | Swing | +7.3 | |

=== Elections in the 1900s ===
Norval Helme

General election 1900: Lancaster
| Party | Candidate | Votes | % | ±% |
|---|---|---|---|---|
| Liberal | Norval Helme | 5,113 | 50.2 | +3.6 |
| Conservative | William Henry Foster | 5,069 | 49.8 | −3.6 |
| Majority | | 44 | 0.4 | N/A |
| Turnout | | 10,182 | 82.6 | −4.8 |
| Registered electors | | 12,334 | | |
| Liberal gain from Conservative | | Swing | +3.6 | |

General election 1906: Lancaster
| Party | Candidate | Votes | % | ±% |
|---|---|---|---|---|
| Liberal | Norval Helme | 6,524 | 53.6 | +3.4 |
| Conservative | William Henry Foster | 5,640 | 46.4 | −3.4 |
| Majority | | 884 | 7.2 | +6.8 |
| Turnout | | 12,164 | 86.4 | +3.8 |
| Registered electors | | 14,085 | | |
| Liberal hold | | Swing | +3.4 | |

=== Elections in the 1910s ===
General election January 1910: Lancaster
| Party | Candidate | Votes | % | ±% |
|---|---|---|---|---|
| Liberal | Norval Helme | 7,132 | 54.1 | +0.5 |
| Conservative | Edward Russell-Taylor | 6,048 | 45.9 | −0.5 |
| Majority | | 1,084 | 8.2 | +1.0 |
| Turnout | | 13,180 | 89.1 | +2.7 |
| Liberal hold | | Swing | | |

General election December 1910: Lancaster
| Party | Candidate | Votes | % | ±% |
|---|---|---|---|---|
| Liberal | Norval Helme | 6,168 | 50.5 | −3.6 |
| Conservative | Herwald Ramsbotham | 6,052 | 49.5 | +3.6 |
| Majority | | 116 | 1.0 | −7.2 |
| Turnout | | 12,220 | 82.6 | −6.5 |
| Liberal hold | | Swing | | |

General Election 1914–15:

Another General Election was required to take place before the end of 1915. The political parties had been making preparations for an election to take place and by July 1914, the following candidates had been selected;

- Liberal: Norval Helme
- Unionist:

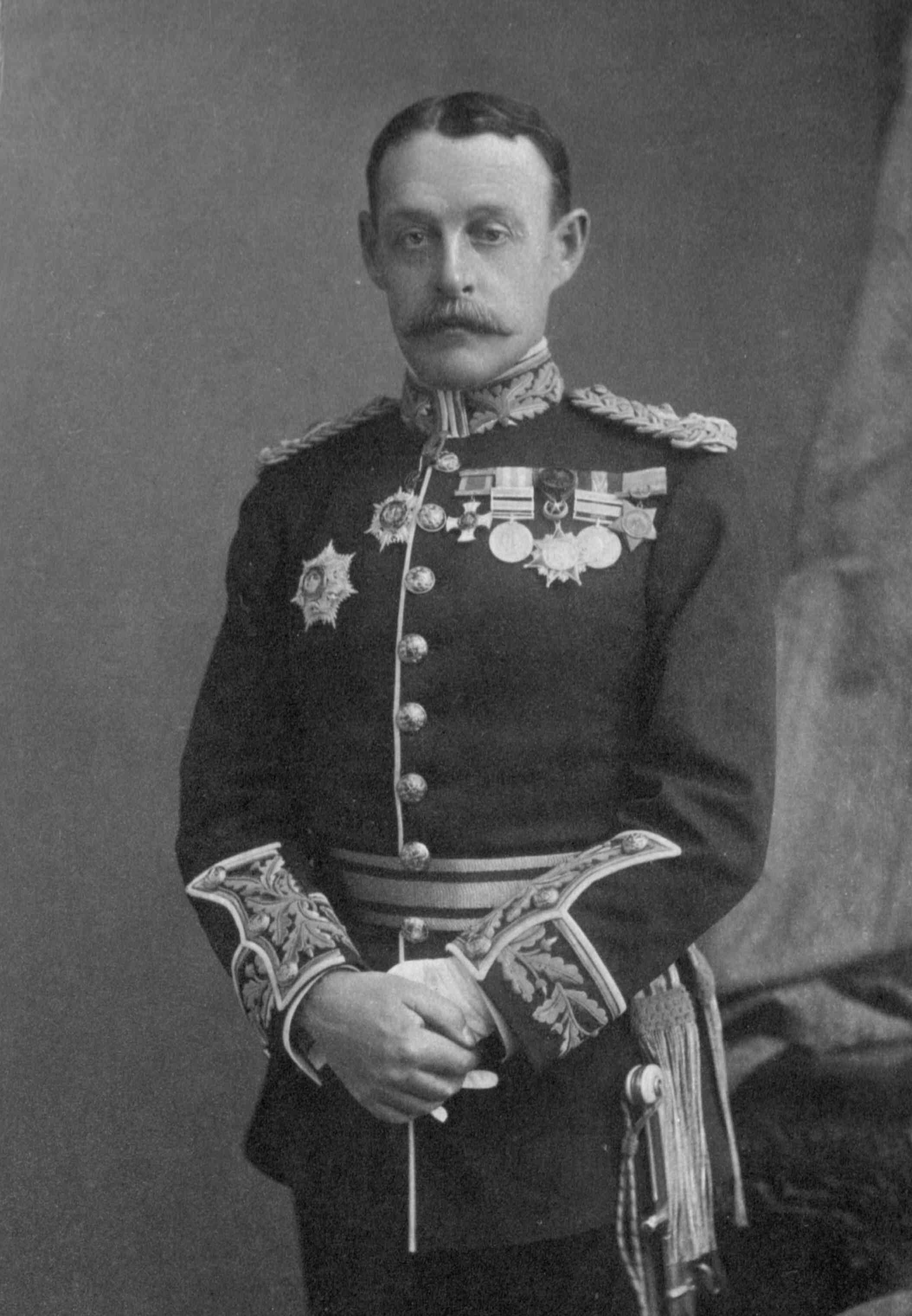
Hunter

General election 1918: Lancaster
| Party | | Candidate | Votes | % | ±% |
|---|---|---|---|---|---|
| C | Unionist | Archibald Hunter | 14,403 | 59.6 | +10.1 |
| | Liberal | Norval Helme | 9,778 | 40.4 | −10.1 |
| Majority | | | 4,625 | 19.2 | N/A |
| Turnout | | | 24,181 | 65.4 | −17.2 |
| Registered electors | | | 36,960 | | |
| | Unionist gain from Liberal | | Swing | +10.1 | |
C indicates candidate endorsed by the coalition government.

=== Elections in the 1920s ===
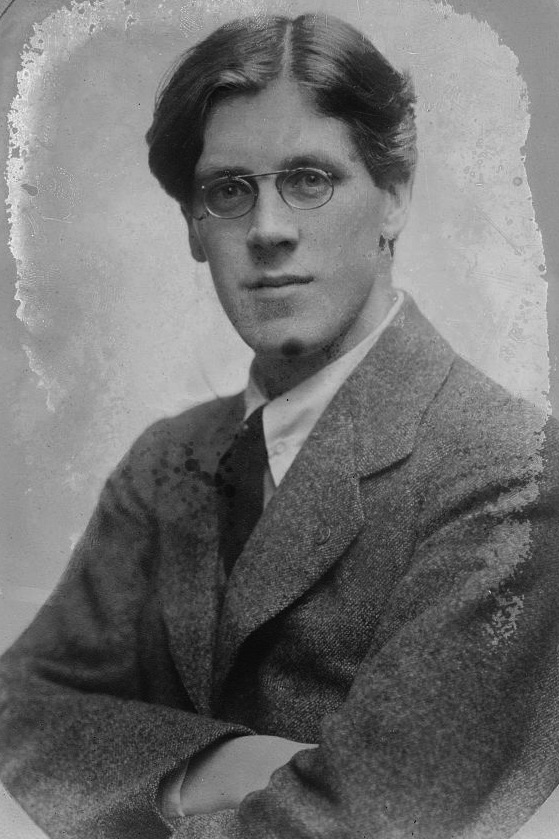
Fenner Brockway

General election 1922: Lancaster
| Party | Candidate | Votes | % | ±% |
|---|---|---|---|---|
| Unionist | John Singleton | 19,571 | 68.4 | +8.8 |
| Labour | Fenner Brockway | 9,043 | 31.6 | New |
| Majority | | 10,528 | 36.8 | +17.6 |
| Turnout | | 28,614 | 79.2 | +13.8 |
| Registered electors | | 36,121 | | |
| Unionist hold | | Swing | +8.8 | |

General election 1923: Lancaster
| Party | Candidate | Votes | % | ±% |
|---|---|---|---|---|
| Liberal | John O'Neill | 17,763 | 59.2 | New |
| Unionist | John Singleton | 12,263 | 40.8 | −27.6 |
| Majority | | 5,500 | 18.4 | N/A |
| Turnout | | 30,026 | 80.0 | +0.8 |
| Registered electors | | 37,522 | | |
| Liberal gain from Unionist | | Swing | N/A | |

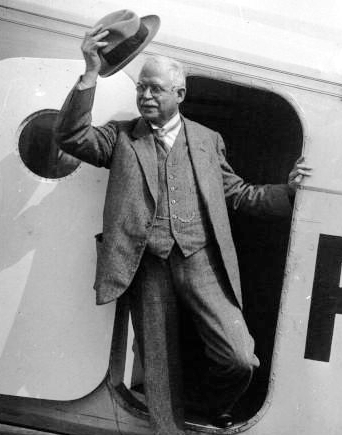
Strickland

General election 1924: Lancaster
| Party | Candidate | Votes | % | ±% |
|---|---|---|---|---|
| Unionist | Gerald Strickland | 15,243 | 47.8 | +7.0 |
| Liberal | John O'Neill | 11,085 | 34.7 | −24.5 |
| Labour | Harold Mostyn Watkins | 5,572 | 17.5 | New |
| Majority | | 4,158 | 13.1 | N/A |
| Turnout | | 31,900 | 82.9 | +2.9 |
| Registered electors | | 38,466 | | |
| Unionist gain from Liberal | | Swing | +15.8 | |

1928 Lancaster by-election
| Party | Candidate | Votes | % | ±% |
|---|---|---|---|---|
| Liberal | Robert Tomlinson | 14,689 | 43.7 | +9.0 |
| Unionist | Herwald Ramsbotham | 12,860 | 38.2 | −9.6 |
| Labour | David R Davies | 6,101 | 18.1 | +0.6 |
| Majority | | 1,829 | 5.5 | N/A |
| Turnout | | 33,650 | 82.7 | −0.2 |
| Registered electors | | 40,705 | | |
| Liberal gain from Unionist | | Swing | +9.3 | |

General election 1929: Lancaster
| Party | Candidate | Votes | % | ±% |
|---|---|---|---|---|
| Unionist | Herwald Ramsbotham | 17,414 | 39.3 | −8.5 |
| Liberal | Robert Tomlinson | 16,977 | 38.3 | +3.6 |
| Labour | Reginald Penrith Burnett | 9,903 | 22.4 | +4.9 |
| Majority | | 437 | 1.0 | −12.1 |
| Turnout | | 44,294 | 83.9 | +1.0 |
| Registered electors | | 52,774 | | |
| Unionist gain from Liberal | | Swing | −6.1 | |

=== Elections in the 1930s ===
General election 1931: Lancaster
| Party | Candidate | Votes | % | ±% |
|---|---|---|---|---|
| Conservative | Herwald Ramsbotham | 32,185 | 75.7 | +36.4 |
| Labour | Robert Carrington-Willis | 10,309 | 24.2 | +1.8 |
| Majority | | 21,876 | 50.5 | +49.5 |
| Turnout | | 42,494 | | |
| Conservative hold | | Swing | | |

- George H Bryans was adopted as Liberal candidate but in October 1931 had a heart attack and withdrew.

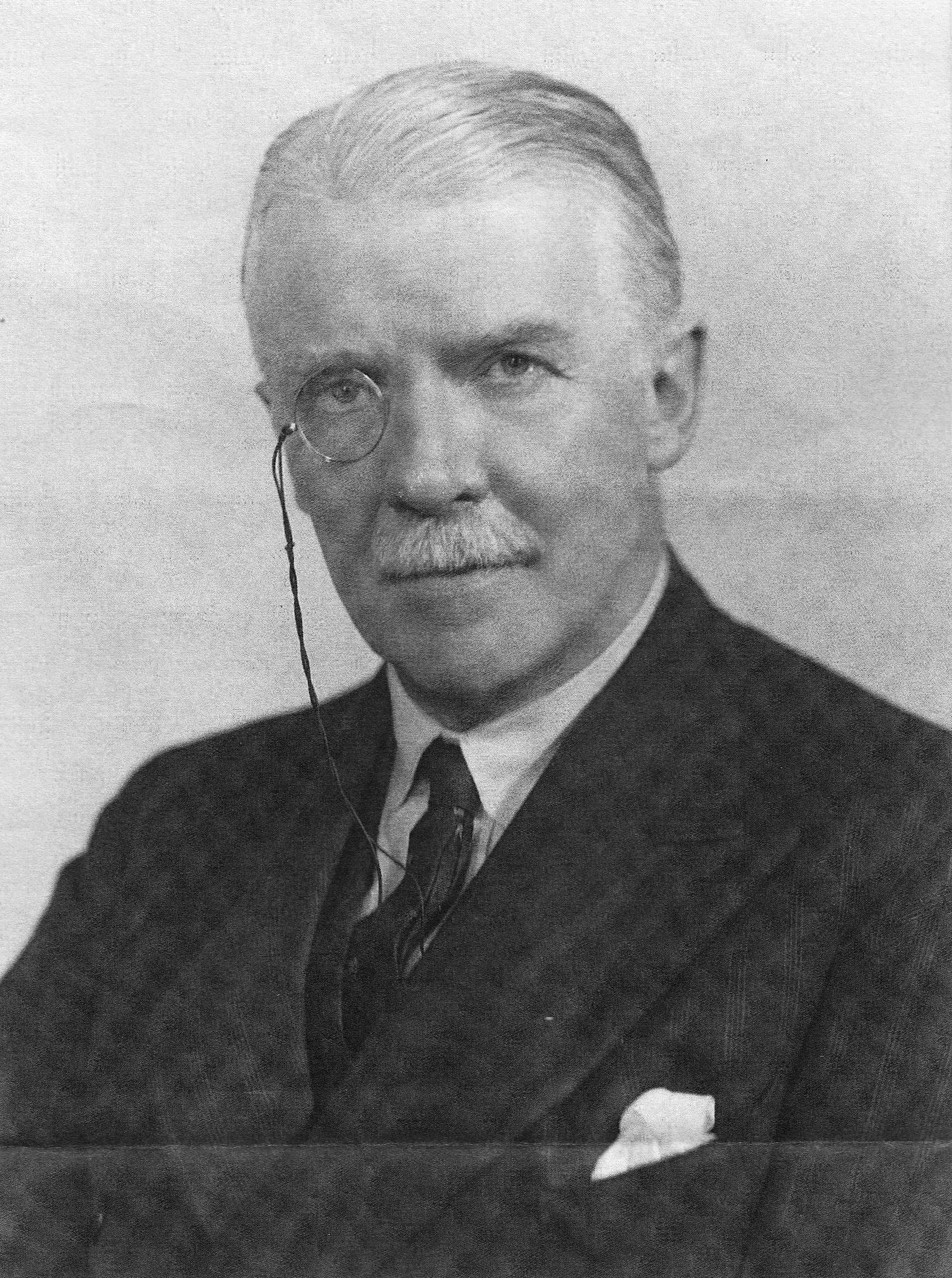
Ramsbotham

General election 1935: Lancaster
| Party | Candidate | Votes | % | ±% |
|---|---|---|---|---|
| Conservative | Herwald Ramsbotham | 26,632 | 53.7 | −22.0 |
| Liberal | Robert Tomlinson | 13,054 | 26.3 | New |
| Labour | Charles Royle | 9,938 | 20.0 | −4.2 |
| Majority | | 13,578 | 27.4 | −23.1 |
| Turnout | | 49,624 | 79.0 | |
| Conservative hold | | Swing | | |

=== Elections in the 1940s ===
General Election 1939–40:

Another General Election was required to take place before the end of 1940. The political parties had been making preparations for an election to take place from 1939 and by the end of this year, the following candidates had been selected;

- Conservative: Herwald Ramsbotham
- Liberal: William Ross
- Labour: Albert Farrer

1941 Lancaster by-election
| Party | Candidate | Votes | % | ±% |
|---|---|---|---|---|
| Conservative | Fitzroy MacLean | 15,783 | 56.9 | +3.2 |
| Independent Liberal | William Ross | 6,551 | 23.6 | New |
| Ind. Labour Party | Fenner Brockway | 5,418 | 19.5 | New |
| Majority | | 9,232 | 33.3 | +5.9 |
| Turnout | | 27,752 | 41.9 | −37.1 |
| Conservative hold | | Swing | +1.5 | |

General election 1945: Lancaster
| Party | Candidate | Votes | % | ±% |
|---|---|---|---|---|
| Conservative | Fitzroy Maclean | 27,090 | 49.42 | |
| Labour | Albert Edward Victor Ainsworth Farrer | 19,367 | 35.33 | |
| Liberal | Eric Johnson | 8,357 | 15.25 | |
| Majority | | 7,723 | 14.09 | |
| Turnout | | 54,814 | | |
| Conservative hold | | Swing | | |

=== Elections in the 1950s ===
General election 1950: Lancaster
| Party | Candidate | Votes | % | ±% |
|---|---|---|---|---|
| Conservative | Fitzroy MacLean | 18,437 | 48.27 | −1.15 |
| Labour | Albert Edward Victor Ainsworth Farrer | 15,341 | 40.17 | +4.84 |
| Liberal | Harold Rogerson | 4,416 | 11.56 | −3.69 |
| Majority | | 3,096 | 8.10 | −5.99 |
| Turnout | | 38,194 | | |
| Conservative hold | | Swing | | |

General election 1951: Lancaster
| Party | Candidate | Votes | % | ±% |
|---|---|---|---|---|
| Conservative | Fitzroy MacLean | 20,555 | 53.18 | |
| Labour | Dodo Lees | 18,099 | 46.82 | |
| Majority | | 2,456 | 6.36 | |
| Turnout | | 38,654 | | |
| Conservative hold | | Swing | | |

General election 1955: Lancaster
| Party | Candidate | Votes | % | ±% |
|---|---|---|---|---|
| Conservative | Fitzroy MacLean | 19,873 | 56.46 | +3.28 |
| Labour | Christopher Sebastian Bravery Attlee | 15,324 | 43.54 | −3.28 |
| Majority | | 4,549 | 12.92 | +6.56 |
| Turnout | | 35,197 | | |
| Conservative hold | | Swing | | |

General election 1959: Lancaster
| Party | Candidate | Votes | % | ±% |
|---|---|---|---|---|
| Conservative | Humphry Berkeley | 20,783 | 56.67 | +1.21 |
| Labour | Ernest Gardner | 15,255 | 42.33 | −1.21 |
| Majority | | 5,528 | 15.34 | +2.42 |
| Turnout | | 36,038 | | |
| Conservative hold | | Swing | | |

=== Elections in the 1960s ===
General election 1964: Lancaster
| Party | Candidate | Votes | % | ±% |
|---|---|---|---|---|
| Conservative | Humphry Berkeley | 18,811 | 53.53 | −4.2 |
| Labour | Ernest Gardner | 16,330 | 46.47 | +4.2 |
| Majority | | 2,481 | 7.06 | −8.28 |
| Turnout | | 35,141 | 79.74 | |
| Conservative hold | | Swing | | |

General election 1966: Lancaster
| Party | Candidate | Votes | % | ±% |
|---|---|---|---|---|
| Labour | Stanley Henig | 18,168 | 52.62 | +6.1 |
| Conservative | Humphry Berkeley | 16,357 | 47.38 | −6.1 |
| Majority | | 1,811 | 5.24 | N/A |
| Turnout | | 34,525 | 79.17 | |
| Labour gain from Conservative | | Swing | | |

=== Elections in the 1970s ===
General election 1970: Lancaster
| Party | Candidate | Votes | % | ±% |
|---|---|---|---|---|
| Conservative | Elaine Kellett | 18,584 | 49.1 | +1.7 |
| Labour | Stanley Henig | 16,843 | 44.5 | −8.1 |
| Liberal | Andrew Paton | 2,436 | 6.4 | New |
| Majority | | 1,741 | 4.6 | N/A |
| Turnout | | 37,863 | 79.5 | +0.3 |
| Conservative gain from Labour | | Swing | +4.9 | |

General election February 1974: Lancaster
| Party | Candidate | Votes | % | ±% |
|---|---|---|---|---|
| Conservative | Elaine Kellett-Bowman | 17,666 | 43.5 | −5.6 |
| Labour | David Owen | 15,197 | 37.4 | −7.1 |
| Liberal | Anthony Walstan Drury | 6,898 | 17.0 | +10.6 |
| Independent Liberal | Philip Edgar Wallace | 631 | 1.6 | New |
| Independent | Geoffrey Darnton | 245 | 0.6 | New |
| Majority | | 2,469 | 6.1 | +1.5 |
| Turnout | | 40,637 | 82.5 | +3.0 |
| Conservative hold | | Swing | | |

General election October 1974: Lancaster
| Party | Candidate | Votes | % | ±% |
|---|---|---|---|---|
| Conservative | Elaine Kellett-Bowman | 16,540 | 42.6 | −0.9 |
| Labour | D. Owen | 15,119 | 39.0 | +1.6 |
| Liberal | Michael Mumford | 7,161 | 18.5 | +1.5 |
| Majority | | 1,421 | 3.7 | −2.4 |
| Turnout | | 38,820 | 83.2 | −0.2 |
| Conservative hold | | Swing | | |

General election 1979: Lancaster
| Party | Candidate | Votes | % | ±% |
|---|---|---|---|---|
| Conservative | Elaine Kellett-Bowman | 19,400 | 47.6 | +5.0 |
| Labour | Ruth Henig | 15,174 | 37.3 | −1.7 |
| Liberal | Michael Mumford | 5,949 | 14.6 | −3.9 |
| National Front | David F. White | 196 | 0.5 | New |
| Majority | | 4,226 | 10.3 | +6.6 |
| Turnout | | 40,719 | 79.5 | −3.7 |
| Conservative hold | | Swing | −3.4 | |

=== Elections in the 1980s ===
General election 1983: Lancaster
| Party | Candidate | Votes | % | ±% |
|---|---|---|---|---|
| Conservative | Elaine Kellett-Bowman | 21,050 | 50.3 | +2.7 |
| Labour | Colin Harkins | 10,414 | 24.9 | −12.4 |
| Liberal | William Booth | 10,214 | 24.4 | +9.8 |
| Independent | Stuart R. Leach | 179 | 0.4 | New |
| Majority | | 10,636 | 25.4 | +15.0 |
| Turnout | | 41,857 | 74.69 | −0.3 |
| Conservative hold | | Swing | +7.6 | |

General election 1987: Lancaster
| Party | Candidate | Votes | % | ±% |
|---|---|---|---|---|
| Conservative | Elaine Kellett-Bowman | 21,142 | 46.7 | −3.6 |
| Labour | Joseph Gallacher | 14,689 | 32.4 | +7.5 |
| Liberal | Claire Brooks | 9,003 | 19.9 | −4.5 |
| Green | Peter Jones | 473 | 1.0 | New |
| Majority | | 6,453 | 14.2 | −11.2 |
| Turnout | | 45,307 | 79.17 | +4.5 |
| Conservative hold | | Swing | −5.6 | |

=== Elections in the 1990s ===
General election 1992: Lancaster
| Party | Candidate | Votes | % | ±% |
|---|---|---|---|---|
| Conservative | Elaine Kellett-Bowman | 21,084 | 45.6 | −1.1 |
| Labour | Ruth Henig | 18,131 | 39.2 | +6.8 |
| Liberal Democrats | John C. Humberstone | 6,524 | 14.1 | −5.8 |
| Green | Gina Dowding | 433 | 0.9 | −0.1 |
| Natural Law | Robert Barcis | 83 | 0.2 | New |
| Majority | | 2,953 | 6.4 | −7.8 |
| Turnout | | 46,255 | 78.9 | −0.3 |
| Conservative hold | | Swing | −3.9 | |

== Notes and references ==
Craig, F. W. S. (1983). British parliamentary election results 1918–1949 (3 ed.). Chichester: Parliamentary Research Services. ISBN 0-900178-06-X.

== Sources ==
- Robert Beatson, A Chronological Register of Both Houses of Parliament (London: Longman, Hurst, Res & Orme, 1807)
- D Brunton & D H Pennington, Members of the Long Parliament (London: George Allen & Unwin, 1954)
- Cobbett's Parliamentary history of England, from the Norman Conquest in 1066 to the year 1803 (London: Thomas Hansard, 1808)
- The Constitutional Year Book for 1913 (London: National Union of Conservative and Unionist Associations, 1913)
- F W S Craig, British Parliamentary Election Results 1832–1885 (2nd edition, Aldershot: Parliamentary Research Services, 1989)
- Maija Jansson (ed.), Proceedings in Parliament, 1614 (House of Commons) (Philadelphia: American Philosophical Society, 1988)
- J E Neale, The Elizabethan House of Commons (London: Jonathan Cape, 1949)
- J Holladay Philbin, Parliamentary Representation 1832 – England and Wales (New Haven: Yale University Press, 1965)
- Henry Stooks Smith, The Parliaments of England from 1715 to 1847 (2nd edition, edited by FWS Craig – Chichester: Parliamentary Reference Publications, 1973)
