= R. Parkinson Tomlinson =

British corn merchant & politician (1881-1943)

Robert Parkinson Tomlinson
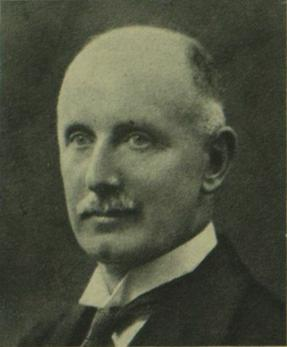
- Robert Tomlinson
- Born: 20 May 1881; Poulton-le-Fylde, Lancashire, England
- Died: 3 June 1943 (aged 62); Cliffdale, Thurnham, Lancashire, England
- Education: Poulton-le-Fylde Grammar School; Claremont College, Blackpool
- Occupations: Corn merchant & politician
- Parents: William Tomlinson (father); Agnes Tomlinson (mother)

Robert Parkinson Tomlinson (20 May 1881 – 3 June 1943) was a British corn merchant and Liberal politician.

== Family and education ==
Tomlinson was born at Poulton-le-Fylde in Lancashire, the son of William and Agnes Ormond Tomlinson. He was educated at Poulton-le-Fylde Grammar School and Claremont College, Blackpool. He never married. In religion Tomlinson was a Methodist. He was sometime President of the Methodist Local Preachers Mutual Aid Association and in 1938/39 he served as vice-president of the Methodist Conference.

== Career ==
Tomlinson set himself up in business and founded Parkinson and Tomlinson, corn and oatmeal millers and seed merchants in The Fylde district. He was regarded as an expert on agricultural questions.

== Politics ==
=== Local politics ===
Perhaps drawn to Liberalism through his nonconformist religious beliefs, Tomlinson took an early interest in public affairs. At the age of just 24 years he was elected to Poulton-le-Fylde Urban District Council and remained a member until the time of his death. On six occasions he was Chairman of the council and for thirty years was Chairman of the Finance Committee. He also sat on many other committees.

=== Other public appointments ===
Tomlinson served as a justice of the peace in Poulton-le-Fylde. He was sometime vice-chairman of Fylde Water Board, chairman of Preston, Garstang and Fylde Joint Hospital Board, a member of Lancashire County Licensing Committee, a member of the Quarter Sessions Appeals Committee, and a member of the Lancashire Agricultural Wages Board.

=== Parliamentary candidate ===
First stood for Parliament at the 1923 general election as Liberal candidate in Fylde in Lancashire but was beaten by 3,280 votes in a straight fight with sitting Conservative MP Lord Stanley.

=== 1928 Lancaster by-election ===
He was next a candidate at a by-election at Lancaster on 9 February 1928 caused by elevation to peerage of Sir Gerald Strickland Tomlinson won by a majority of 1,829 over his Tory opponent Herwald Ramsbotham with Labour in third place. Turnout was 82% And Tomlinson overturned a Conservative majority from the previous election of 4,158.

=== 1929–1935 ===
Tomlinson was unable to hold the seat at the 1929 general election however, with Ramsbotham gaining it for the Conservatives, albeit by the small margin of 437 votes. Tomlinson did not contest the 1931 general election but did try again in 1935, this time finding himself again in second place although this time behind by 13,578.

== Death ==
Tomlinson died at Cliffdale, Thurnham, in Lancashire on 3 June 1943, aged 62 years.

Parliament of the United Kingdom
| Preceded by Gerald Strickland | Member of Parliament for Lancaster; 1928–1929 | Succeeded by Herwald Ramsbotham |
