= Richard Weston (died 1572) =

English politician

Richard Weston (by 1527 – 1572), of the Middle Temple, London and Roxwell, Essex, was an English politician.

Weston was a Member of the Parliament of England (MP) for Lostwithiel in March 1553, for Saltash in October 1553, for Maldon in 1555 and for Lancaster in November 1554.
