= Richard Kirkby =

English politician

Richard Kirkby (c. 1625 – 9 September 1681) was an English politician who sat in the House of Commons from 1661 to 1681.

Kirkby was the son of Roger Kirkby or Kirby of Kirkby Ireleth, Lancashire and his wife Agnes Lowther, sister of Sir John Lowther, 1st Baronet.

Kirkby was a justice of the peace for Lancashire from 1663 until his death and custos rotulorum for the same county, also until death. He was elected member of parliament for Lancaster in 1661 for the Cavalier Parliament and retained the seat until his death in 1681.

Kirkby married three times. His first wife was Elizabeth Murray by whom he had children Roger Kirkby (c.1649–1709), Agnes and Temperance. He married secondly Isabel Huddleston, daughter of Sir William Huddleston of Millom and had children Capt. Richard Kirkby, RN (c.1657–1703), shot for cowardice, William Kirkby (b. c.1658) and Elizabeth Kirkby. His third wife was Helen Maxey and he had children Greville Kirkby (b. 1662) and Mary Kirkby.

Parliament of England
Preceded by Sir Gilbert Gerard, Bt; William West	Member of Parliament for Lancaster; 1661–1681	Succeeded by Henry Crispe; Roger Kirkby
