= William Rice (MP) =

16th-century English politician

William Rice (by 1522 – 1588), of Medmenham, Buckinghamshire, was an English politician.

== Family ==
William Rice was the son of Mr. Rice and his wife Eden née Saunders, daughter of Thomas Saunders. He married Barbara Fuller.

== Career ==
He was a member (MP) of the parliament of England for Aylesbury in November 1554 and 1555, and for Lancaster in 1558.
