= John Singleton (British judge) =

Sir John Edward Singleton (18 January 1885 – 6 January 1957) was a British politician and judge.

== Early life and career ==
Singleton was born in St Michael's on Wyre, Lancashire, and was educated at Lancaster Royal Grammar School and Pembroke College, Cambridge, where he studied Law, obtaining a third-class degree. He was called to the bar at the Inner Temple in 1906, and joined the Northern Circuit. During World War I he served in the Royal Field Artillery, achieving the rank of captain. He was also mentioned in dispatches. He became a King's Counsel in 1922.

In the 1922 general election, he was elected to the House of Commons for Lancaster as a Conservative, but was unseated in the 1923 general election by the Liberal candidate. After his defeat, he returned to the bar; he was Judge of Appeal in the Isle of Man between 1928 and 1932, and Recorder of Preston between 1928 and 1934.

== Judicial career ==
Singleton was appointed a judge of the King's Bench Division of the High Court in 1934, receiving the customary knighthood. In 1936, he presided over the murder trial of Buck Ruxton at the Manchester Assizes. The prosecutor on that case was Joseph Cooksey Jackson, who had also attended Lancaster Royal Grammar School.

During World War II, he was asked by the Cabinet to report on the effectiveness of the Royal Air Force's strategic bombing campaign.

In 1946, he served as the British chairman of the Anglo-American Committee of Inquiry on Mandatory Palestine. Richard Crossman, who also served on the Committee, described Singleton as being 'intensely loyal to what he conceived to be the interests of the [British] government'. An anti-Zionist, Singleton favoured the disarming of the Hagenah and the curtailment of the functions of the Jewish Agency.

In 1948, Singleton was appointed a Lord Justice of Appeal, and was sworn into the Privy Council. He served on the Court of Appeal until his death in 1957.

== Decisions ==
- Hartog v Colin & Shields [1939] 3 All ER 566

== Cited works and further reading ==
- Blundell, R. H.; Wilson; G. Haswell (1950). James H. Hodge (ed.). Famous Trials III. Middlesex: Penguin Books. pp. 162–236. ISBN 978-0-140-00787-9.
- Craddock, Jeremy (2022) [2021]. The Jigsaw Murders: The True Story of the Ruxton Killings and the Birth of Modern Forensics. Cheltenham: The History Press. ISBN 978-0-750-99767-6.
