= Curwen Rawlinson (MP) =

Curwen Rawlinson (3 June 1641 – 29 August 1689) was the Member of Parliament for the Lancaster constituency from 17 January until his death on 29 August of that year.

Rawlinson was the first son of Robert Rawlinson, of Carke Hall, Cartmel, then in Lancashire. His mother was Jane Wilson, daughter of Thomas Wilson of Haversham Hall.

Rawlinson was the father of Christopher Rawlinson the antiquary.

Rawlinson died on 29 August 1689 in Warwick at the age of 48.
