= Patrick Maxwell Stewart =

Patrick Maxwell Stewart (28 February 1795 – 30 October 1846) was a London merchant and Whig MP for Lancaster (1831–1837) and Renfrewshire (1841–1846).
