= Robert Heysham =

Robert Heysham (1663–1723), of London and Stagenhoe, Hertfordshire, was an English Member of Parliament (MP).

He was a Member of the Parliament of England for Lancaster 1698 – 1715 and for City of London 1715 – 1722.

The Register of British Slave Traders describes him as:

one of the most important and largescale traffickers of enslaved African people of the early eighteenth century
