= George Harrison (Hertford MP) =

British politician

Member of Parliament for Hertford
- In office 1741-1759 Serving with Nathaniel Brassey

Member of Parliament for Hertford
- In office 1727-1734 Serving with Sir Thomas Clarke

Personal details
- Born: 10 February 1680
- Died: 1759 (aged 78–79)
- Spouse: Mary Feilde (m. 1737)
- Parent: Richard Harrison (father)
- Relatives: Edward Harrison (brother); Thomas Harrison (brother); George Villiers (grandfather); Sir John Harrison (grandfather)
- Education: Wadham College, Oxford

George Harrison (10 February 1680 – 1759), of Balls Park, near Hertford, was a British politician who sat in the House of Commons for 25 years between 1727 and 1759.

== Early life ==
Harrison was the fifth, but second surviving son of Richard Harrison and Audrey Villiers daughter of George Villiers, 4th Viscount Grandison. He was educated at Charterhouse School from 1695 to 1697 and matriculated at Wadham College, Oxford on 3 July 1697, aged 17.

== Career ==
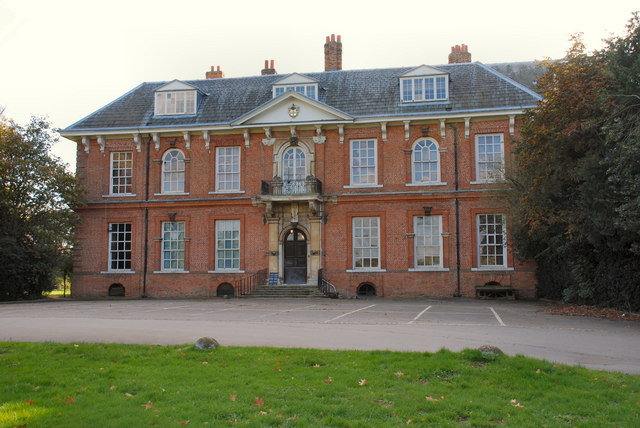
Balls Park

Harrison replaced his brother Edward Harrison, who was appointed Postmaster General, as Member of Parliament for Hertford at a by-election on 23 January 1727. He succeeded to the estates of his brother in 1732 and did not stand at the 1734 general election. He was returned for Hertford without a contest at the general elections of 1741, 1747 and 1754, voting with the Administration in every recorded division. He drew a secret service pension of £500 in 1753 and 1754, but was a wealthy man and does not appear to have drawn them subsequently.

== Later life and legacy ==
Harrison married Mary Feilde, daughter of Edward Feilde of Stanstead Abbots, Hertfordshire on 12 June 1737. He died without issue on 2 December 1759, leaving his principal estate to his niece Audrey or Etheldreda, who married Charles Townshend, 3rd Viscount Townshend. This was with the proviso that it was to be free from any "intermeddling" from her husband, from whom she separated formally around 1740. As well as Edward, his brother Thomas Harrison, and brother-in-law Edward Hughes were also Members of Parliament.

Parliament of Great Britain
Preceded by Edward Harrison; Sir Thomas Clarke	Member of Parliament for Hertford; 1727–1734; With: Sir Thomas Clarke	Succeeded by Nathaniel Brassey; Sir Thomas Clarke
Preceded by Nathaniel Brassey; Sir Thomas Clarke	Member of Parliament for Hertford; 1741–1759; With: Nathaniel Brassey	Succeeded by Nathaniel Brassey; George Cowper
