= Thomas Harrison (British Army officer) =

British Army officer and politician

Member of Parliament for Old Sarum
- In office 30 May 1728-1734 Serving with Matthew St Quintin

Personal details
- Born: 1681
- Died: Before 1755
- Parent: Richard Harrison (father)
- Relatives: Edward Harrison (brother); George Harrison (brother); George Villiers (grandfather); Sir John Harrison (grandfather)
- Military career
- Allegiance: United Kingdom
- Branch: Army
- Rank: Adjutant-general
- Units: 4th Dragoon Guards; 1st Foot Guards; 6th Foot

Thomas Harrison (1681 - before 1755) was a British Army officer and politician who sat in the House of Commons from 1728 to 1734.

== Biography ==
Harrison was baptized on 24 April 1681, the sixth son of Richard Harrison, MP of Balls Park and his wife Audrey Villiers, daughter of George Villiers, 4th Viscount Grandison.

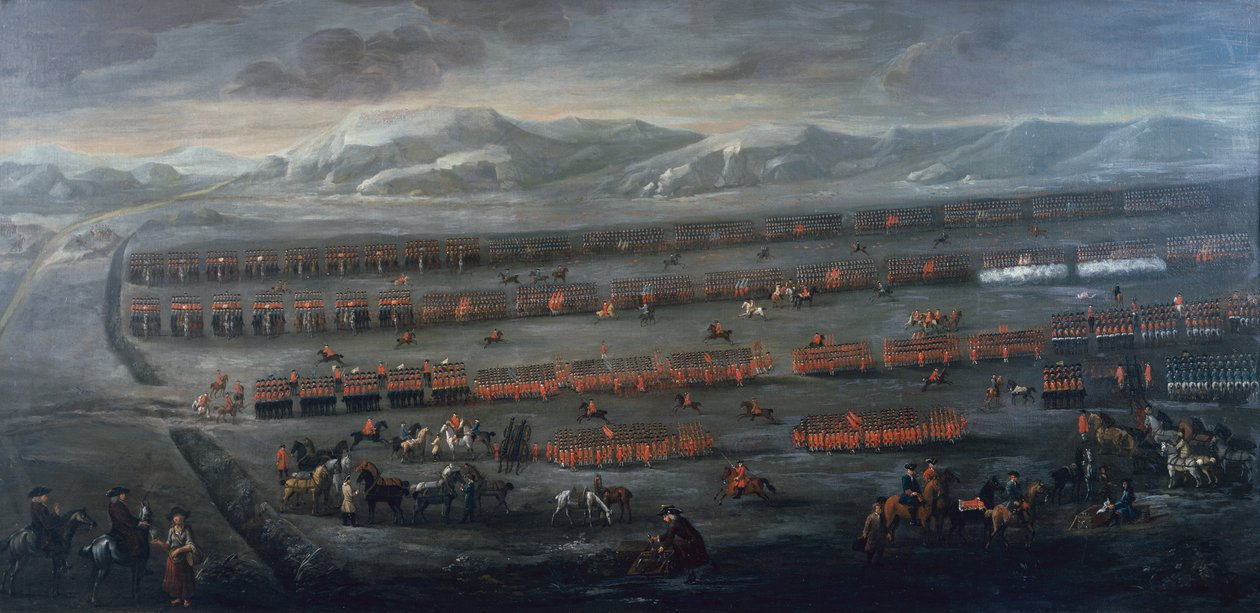
The Battle of Sheriffmuir, which Harrison fought in

Harrison joined the army and was a cornet in the 4th Dragoon Guards in 1697, aide-de-camp to the Duke of Ormonde, Lord lieutenant of Ireland before 1705, captain and lieutenant colonel in the 1st Foot Guards in 1705, brevet colonel in 1707 and colonel of the 6th Foot from 1708 to 1716. He was adjutant-general in Spain in 1708 and brought back Lord Stanhope’s despatches after the victory at the Battle of Saragossa in 1710, for which he received £1,000 from Queen Anne. In 1715 he was adjutant-general in Scotland where he was present at the Battle of Sheriffmuir and brought the Duke of Argyll's despatches to George I, who gave him £500. He sold his regiment in March 1716.

Harrison stood for Parliament at Steyning at a by-election in 1724, but was defeated in a contest. He was brought in as Member of Parliament for Old Sarum at a by-election on 30 May 1728 when Thomas Pitt recruited two voters to defeat the single supporter of Henry Fox. In Parliament he voted with the Administration on the Hessians in 1730 but against them on the Excise Bill in 1733 and on the repeal of the Septennial Act in 1734. He was not chosen again at the 1734 British general election and when Thomas Pitt put up his brother William Pitt for Old Sarum at a by-election in 1735, Harrison offered to pay him off, which William Pitt considered absurd and impertinent.

Harrison was probably unmarried and died before 1755. His brothers Edward and George Harrison were also MPs.

Parliament of Great Britain
Preceded by Matthew St Quintin; The Earl of Londonderry	Member of Parliament for Old Sarum; 1728–1734; With: Matthew St Quintin	Succeeded by Thomas Pitt of Boconnoc; Robert Nedham
