= Edward Hughes (MP) =

British politician

Edward Hughes (died 1734), of Hertingfordbury, Hertfordshire, was a British politician who sat in the House of Commons from 1722 to 1734.

Hughes was probably the son of John Hughes of Hertingfordbury, who was High Sheriff of Hertfordshire in. 1718. He himself was JP and became Judge advocate general of the army in 1714. He married (with £2,000), Elizabeth Harrison, daughter of Richard Harrison of Balls Park, Hertfordshire on 26 November 1713. His wife's family were influential and wealthy and his brothers-in-law Edward and George Harrison were also MPs. She died on 15 November 1714 and was commemorated in a poem by John Hughes.

Hughes was elected as Member of Parliament for Saltash on the Admiralty interest in a contest at the 1722 general election. Although it was reported that ‘at Saltash they don’t relish Mr. Hughes, but make no difficulty of choosing a better man’, he was returned again unopposed at the 1727 general election. He voted with the Administration except in the divisions on the excise and spoke for the Administration in a debate of 12 February 1730 on Dunkirk, and on 18 February in support of a petition from the Royal African Company for a subsidy to maintain its forts and settlements. He was a member of the gaols committee in the year 1728 to 1729. In 1732, a bill enabling the Charitable Corporation to raise new capital was before Parliament, and it was alleged that Hughes had complained to the directors of the corporation that he was ‘ill used by them’, in being given no shares for supporting the bill.

Hughes died in debt on 26 January 1734, leaving two sons and a daughter. His widow renounced the executorship of his will to his principal creditor.

Parliament of Great Britain
Preceded by Shilston Calmady; John Francis Buller	Member of Parliament for Saltash; 1722–1734; With: Thomas Swanton; Philip Lloyd 1723; Lord Glenorchy 1727	Succeeded by Lord Glenorchy; Thomas Corbett
