= John Harrison (died 1669) =

English politician

Member of Parliament for Lancaster
- In office 1640-1643; 1661–1669 Serving with Thomas Fanshawe (1640–1643); Richard Kirkby (1640; 1661-1669)

Member of Parliament for Scarborough
- In office 1628-1640

Personal details
- Born: c. 1590 Lancaster, Lancashire, England
- Died: 28 September 1669 (aged 80) Balls Park, Hertford, England
- Spouse(s): Margaret Fanshawe; Mary Shotbolt
- Children: 7, including Richard and Ann
- Relatives: Edward Harrison (grandson); George Harrison (grandson); Thomas Harrison (grandson)

Sir John Harrison (c. 1590 – 28 September 1669) of Balls Park, Hertfordshire was an English politician who sat in the House of Commons variously between 1640 and 1669. He supported the Royalist side in the English Civil War.

== Public life ==
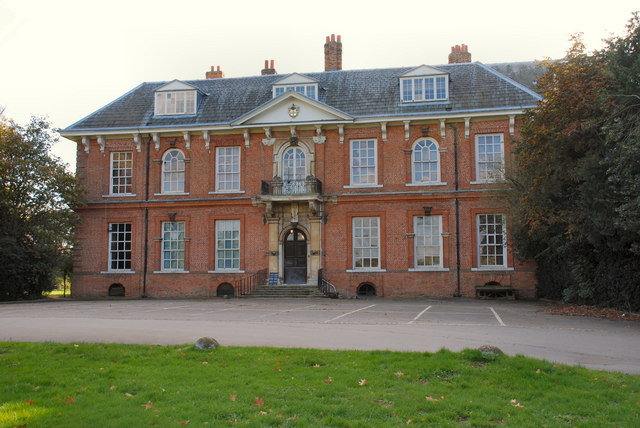
Balls Park, Hertford

Harrison was born in Lancaster, the 12th son of a yeoman, and went to London in 1611 at the age of 22. He was one of the first to suggest the position of commissioner of the customs and was given that post.

Harrison was elected MP for Scarborough in 1628. In April 1640, he was elected member of parliament for Lancaster in the Short Parliament. He was then elected for Lancaster in November 1640 for the Long Parliament.

He built Balls Park House in Hertford between 1637 and 1640 and was knighted in 1641. He supported the king during the Civil War and was disabled from sitting in September 1643. He suffered greatly from his loyalty, being fined £10,745. After the Restoration, Harrison was elected MP for Lancaster again in 1661 for the Cavalier Parliament and held the seat until his death in 1669. He served as a gentleman of the Privy Chamber from 1664 until his death.

== Private life ==
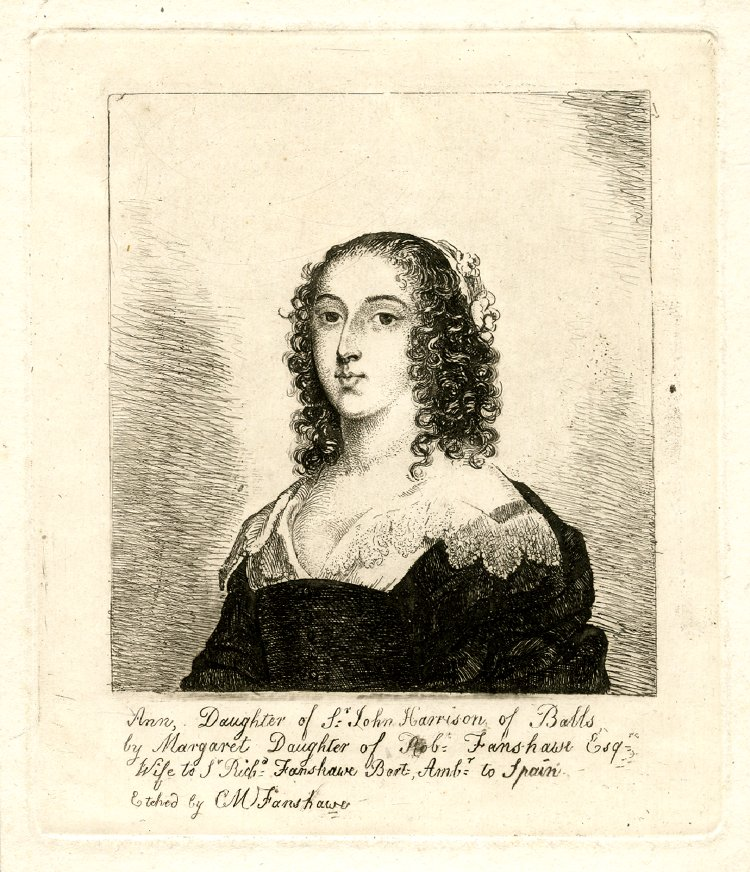
Portrait of Sir John Harrison's daughter Ann, who married Sir Richard Fanshawe, 1st Baronet and Ambassador to Spain

Harrison died at the age of 80, at Balls Park, Hertford and was buried at All Saints' Church, Hertford.

He had married, firstly, Margaret Fanshawe, daughter of Robert Fanshawe, by whom he had three sons, all of whom predeceased him, and two daughters, and, secondly, Mary Shotbolt, daughter of Philip Shotbolt, by whom he had a son and a daughter. His elder daughter Ann by his first wife married Sir Richard Fanshawe, 1st Baronet ambassador to Spain. He was survived by his three daughters and his youngest son, the only son of his second marriage, Richard Harrison (1646–1726), who succeeded him at Balls Park and was also the member of parliament for Lancaster.

His descendants included Audrey Etheldreda Harrison and George Townshend, 1st Marquess Townshend.

Parliament of England
Vacant Parliament suspended since 1629	Member of Parliament for Lancaster; 1640–1643; With: Roger Kirkby 1640; Thomas Fanshawe 1640–1643	Succeeded by Thomas Fell; Sir Robert Bindlosse, 1st Baronet
Preceded by Sir Gilbert Gerard, Bt; William West	Member of Parliament for Lancaster; 1661–1669; With: Richard Kirkby	Succeeded by Richard Kirkby; Richard Harrison
