= Thomas Fanshawe (disambiguation) =

Thomas Fanshawe (1580–1631) was an English politician.

Thomas Fanshawe may also refer to:

- Thomas Fanshawe (of Jenkins) (1607–1651), English politician, son of the above
- Thomas Fanshawe (1628–1705), English politician, member of parliament for Essex, son of the above
- Thomas Fanshawe, 1st Viscount Fanshawe (1596–1665), English politician
- Thomas Fanshawe (remembrancer of the exchequer) (1533–1601), member of the English Parliament
- Thomas Fanshawe, 2nd Viscount Fanshawe (1632–1674), Irish peer and member of parliament
