= Charles Townshend =

British politician (1725–1767)

The Right Honourable Charles Townshend MP
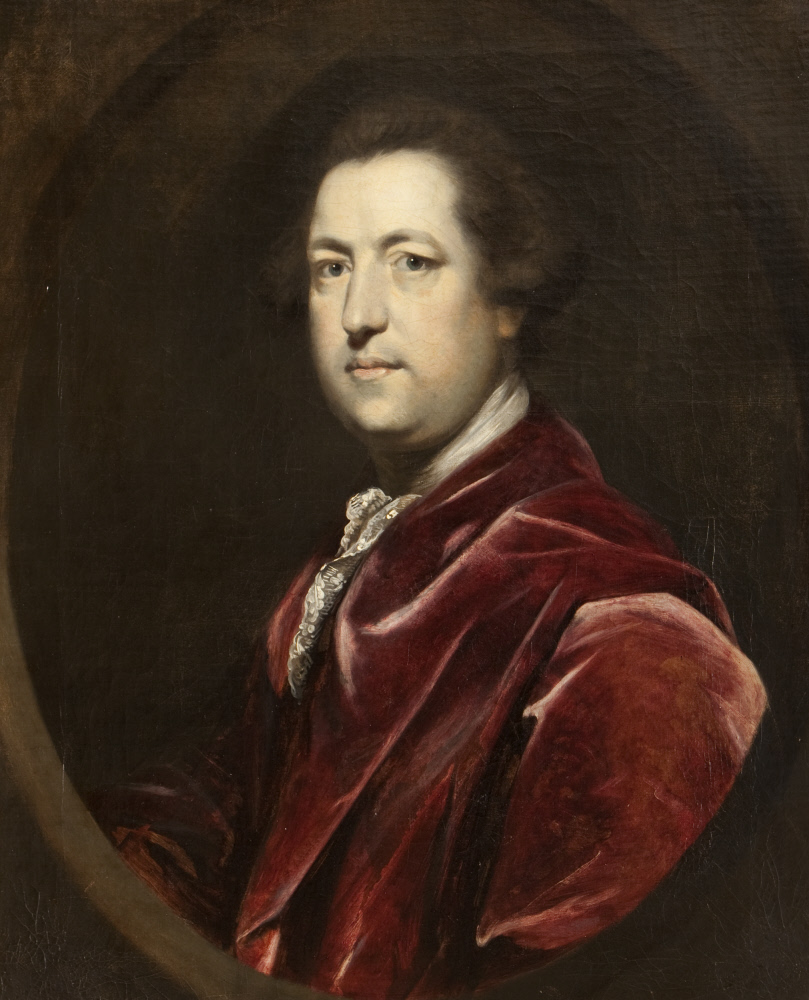
- Portrait by Joshua Reynolds

Chancellor of the Exchequer
- In office 2 August 1766 – 4 September 1767
- Monarch: George III
- Prime Minister: The Earl of Chatham
- Preceded by: William Dowdeswell
- Succeeded by: Lord North

President of the Board of Trade
- In office 1 March 1763 – 20 April 1763
- Preceded by: The Lord Sandys
- Succeeded by: The Earl of Shelburne

Personal details
- Born: 27 August 1725 Raynham Hall, Norfolk, England
- Died: 4 September 1767 (aged 42)
- Party: Whig
- Spouse: Lady Caroline Campbell
- Education: University of Leiden; University of Oxford

Charles Townshend (27 August 1725 – 4 September 1767) was a British politician who held various titles in the Parliament of Great Britain. His establishment of the controversial Townshend Acts is considered one of the key causes of the American Revolution.

Townshend was born at Raynham Hall in Norfolk, England, as the second son of Charles Townshend, 3rd Viscount Townshend, and Audrey Harrison. A sickly child, he later graduated from Leiden University and served in various political roles, including as a member of the Board of Trade, Lord of the Admiralty, Paymaster of the Forces, and Chancellor of the Exchequer. He played a significant role in the taxation and control of American colonies, proposing the Townshend Acts, which imposed taxes on various exports to America. These acts were met with resistance and eventually led to the American Revolution. Townshend died in September 1767. He was married to Caroline Campbell, who later became the Baroness Greenwich, and his brother, George Townshend, became the Lord-lieutenant of Ireland.

== Early life ==
He was born at his family's seat of Raynham Hall in Norfolk, England, the second son of Charles Townshend, 3rd Viscount Townshend, and Audrey (died 1788), daughter and heiress of Edward Harrison of Ball's Park, near Hertford. He was a sickly child, had epilepsy, and had a strained relationship with his parents. Townshend was a brash young man, whose "wonderful endowments [were] dashed with follies and indiscretions." Charles graduated from the Dutch Leiden University on 27 October 1745; while there he had associated with a small group of other British youth, who later became well known in various circles, including Dowdeswell, Wilkes, and Alexander Carlyle. The latter would chronicle their exploits in his Autobiography.

Following his return in 1746, he represented Great Yarmouth in Parliament until 1756, when he found a seat for the admiralty borough of Saltash, subsequently transferring in 1761 to Harwich, another borough where the seat was in the government's gift. Public attention was first drawn to his abilities in 1753, when he delivered a lively attack against Lord Hardwicke's marriage bill, although this measure passed into law.

== Politics ==
From 1749 – April 1754, Townshend was a member of the Board of Trade. It was during this time that he first showed an interest in increasing British powers of taxation and control over the American colonies. In 1754 and 1755, he served as Lord of the Admiralty, but at the close of 1755, his passionate attack against the policy of the ministry caused his resignation. In the administration which was formed in November 1756, and which was ruled by William Pitt the Elder, the lucrative office of treasurer of the chamber was given to Townshend, but he retired the following Spring and George Grenville took over. The higher post of First Lord of the Admiralty then fell to Townshend's lot and his refusal to accept the nomination led to his exclusion from the new administration.

In the dying days of Grenville's cabinet, to retain the administration of Lord Rockingham, Townshend accepted the position of Paymaster of The Forces, though he questioned the stability of the administration, calling it a "mere Lute-string administration" and stating that it was "pretty 'summer wear', but it will never stand the winter."

== Chancellor of the Exchequer ==
Under the ministry of William Pitt the Elder, Townshend accepted the role of Chancellor of the Exchequer in August 1766. A few weeks later his urgent appeals to the Prime Minister for increased power were favorably answered, and he was admitted to the inner circle of the cabinet. The new chancellor proposed the continuance of the land tax at four shillings in the pound, while he held out hopes that it might be reduced next year to three shillings, whereupon his predecessor, William Dowdeswell, by the aid of the landed gentlemen, carried a motion that the reduction should take effect at once. Townshend pledged to find revenue in America with which to meet the deficiency caused by the reduction.

Early in 1767, shortly after The Stamp Act was repealed owing to colonial protests and boycotts of British goods, Townshend proposed that the Parliament could procure revenue from the Americans without causing them offense via "external" import taxes instead of internal taxes. These were known as the Townshend Acts. The Acts passed resolutions for taxing several exports to America, such as glass, paint, paper and tea. The Townshend Acts established a Board of Commissioners in Boston to enforce them, which was seen as a threat to the American colonial tradition of self-government. He estimated these export taxes would produce a sum of £40,000 for the British treasury. He had the support of his cousin Thomas Townshend who was also a minister in the government. The Townshend Acts would be Townshend's last official act before his death.

Soon after that he died somewhat suddenly of a fever on 4 September 1767.

== Private life ==
In August 1755 he had married Caroline Campbell (d. 1794), the eldest daughter of John Campbell, 2nd Duke of Argyll and the widow of Francis Scott, Earl of Dalkeith, the eldest son of Francis Scott, 2nd Duke of Buccleuch. According to Burke's Peerage, he had two sons (who died young) and a daughter; one of the sons was called Charles, who was born circa 1755, was a talented (amateur) actor under 14 years of age but died unmarried.

Townshend's wife was created (August 1767) baroness Greenwich, and his elder brother George Townshend, 1st Marquess Townshend, was made Lord-lieutenant of Ireland.

Townshend conceived a problematic and incestuous feeling for his step-daughter Frances Douglas, Lady Douglas, who was twenty-five years younger and still a child when his mother married him, and her memorialist, Lady Louisa Stuart, wrote after his death of his character:

This was careless, gay, inconsiderate, volatile, seemingly foreign to every serious reflection or feeling. He had one of those happy tempers which nothing can ruffle, without a grain of pride, sternness or resentment in his nature. Ready to laugh with every body and at every thing, he poured out wit in torrents; and it was so much the worse for truth if ever truth stood in wit's way.

The American towns of Townsend, Massachusetts and Townshend, Vermont were founded and named after Charles Townshend in 1732 and 1753, respectively. Raynham, Massachusetts was also named after him.

== Ancestry ==
Ancestors of Charles Townshend

8. Horatio Townshend, 1st Viscount Townshend
4. Charles Townshend, 2nd Viscount Townshend
9. Mary Ashe
2. Charles Townshend, 3rd Viscount Townshend
10. Thomas Pelham, 1st Baron Pelham
5. Hon. Elizabeth Pelham
11. Elizabeth Jones
1. Charles Townshend
12. Richard Harrison
6. Edward Harrison
13. Audrey Villiers
3. Audrey Harrison
14. Reginald Bray
7. Frances Bray
15. Jane Rainton

Parliament of Great Britain
Preceded by Roger Townshend; Edward Walpole	Member of Parliament for Great Yarmouth; 1747–1756; With: Edward Walpole	Succeeded by Charles Townshend; Edward Walpole
Preceded by George Clinton; Viscount Duncannon	Member of Parliament for Saltash; 1756–1761; With: George Clinton	Succeeded by John Clevland; George Adams
Preceded by Thomas Sewell; Wenman Coke	Member of Parliament for Harwich; 1761–1767; With: John Roberts	Succeeded by Thomas Bradshaw; John Roberts
Political offices
Preceded by The Earl of Hillsborough	Treasurer of the Chamber; 1756–1761	Succeeded by Sir Francis Dashwood, Bt
Preceded by The Lord Holland	Paymaster of the Forces; 1765–1766	Succeeded by Lord North and George Cooke
Preceded by William Dowdeswell	Chancellor of the Exchequer; 1766–1767	Succeeded by Lord North
