= Lady Brown =

Lady Brown may refer to:

- Lady Brown (song), Japanese hip hop song by Nujabes
- Margaret Cecil, Lady Brown (1689–1782), society patroness and antagonist of the composer Handel
- Julia King, Baroness Brown of Cambridge, engineer and academic
- Lyn Brown, Baroness Brown of Silvertown, politician
