= Edward Hooper (MP) =

British Politician

Edward Hooper, FRS, (c. 1701–1795) of Worthy Park, Hampshire was a British lawyer and Whig politician who sat in the House of Commons from 1734 to 1748.

Hooper was the eldest son of Edward Hooper of Heron (or Hurn) Court, Christchurch, Hampshire and his wife Lady Dorothy Ashley Cooper, daughter of Anthony Ashley-Cooper, 2nd Earl of Shaftesbury. He was admitted at Middle Temple in 1717 and matriculated at Trinity College, Oxford on 5 May 1720, aged 18. He was called to the bar in 1724.

Hooper stood unsuccessfully for Christchurch in a contest at the 1727 British general election. He was returned unopposed as a Whig Member of Parliament for Christchurch at the 1734 British general election. In Parliament he attached himself to William Pulteney, and spoke on 16 November 1739 supporting Pulteney's bill to encourage seamen by giving them the Government's share in the prize money. He became involved with the affairs of Georgia, through his cousin, the 4th Earl of Shaftesbury, who was a common councillor of the Georgia Society. He seconded a motion for an inquiry into its advantages on 28 January 1740. On 21 January 1741, he presented the Society's petition for further support, and on the 28th moved that £10,000 be given towards this. He was returned unopposed as NP for Christchurch at the 1741 British general election. After the fall of Walpole in 1742, Hooper was elected to the secret committee set up by the House of Commons in April 1742 to investigate the last ten years of Walpole's Administration. He was rewarded by Pulteney, now Lord Bath, with a place as Paymaster of Pensions, worth £900 a year, on 13 July 1742. He lost this place on 22 December 1744 when most members of the Bath-Granville group were turned out on Granville's fall in 1744. He was returned for Christchurch at the 1747 British general election and was considered a government supporter. In December 1748, he was appointed a commissioner of customs and vacated his seat in the House of Commons as a result.

Hooper continued to be involved in political life at Christchurch. From 1754 he controlled both seats, returning his cousin James Harris, for one, and putting the other at the Government's disposal. In 1759 he succeeded his father to his estate including Heron Court. He became a Fellow of the Royal Society on 31 May 1759 and was also a vice president of the Society for the encouragement of Arts, Manufactures & Commerce. He died unmarried on 6 September 1795, and left all his property to Lord Malmesbury.

Parliament of Great Britain
Preceded by Joseph Hinxman; Philip Lloyd	Member of Parliament for Christchurch; 1734–1748; With: Joseph Hinxman 1734-1740; Charles Armand Powlett 1740-1748	Succeeded by Charles Armand Powlett; Sir Thomas Robinson
