= John Campbell, 3rd Earl of Breadalbane and Holland =

British politician and diplomat

The Right Honourable The Earl of Breadalbane and Holland KB
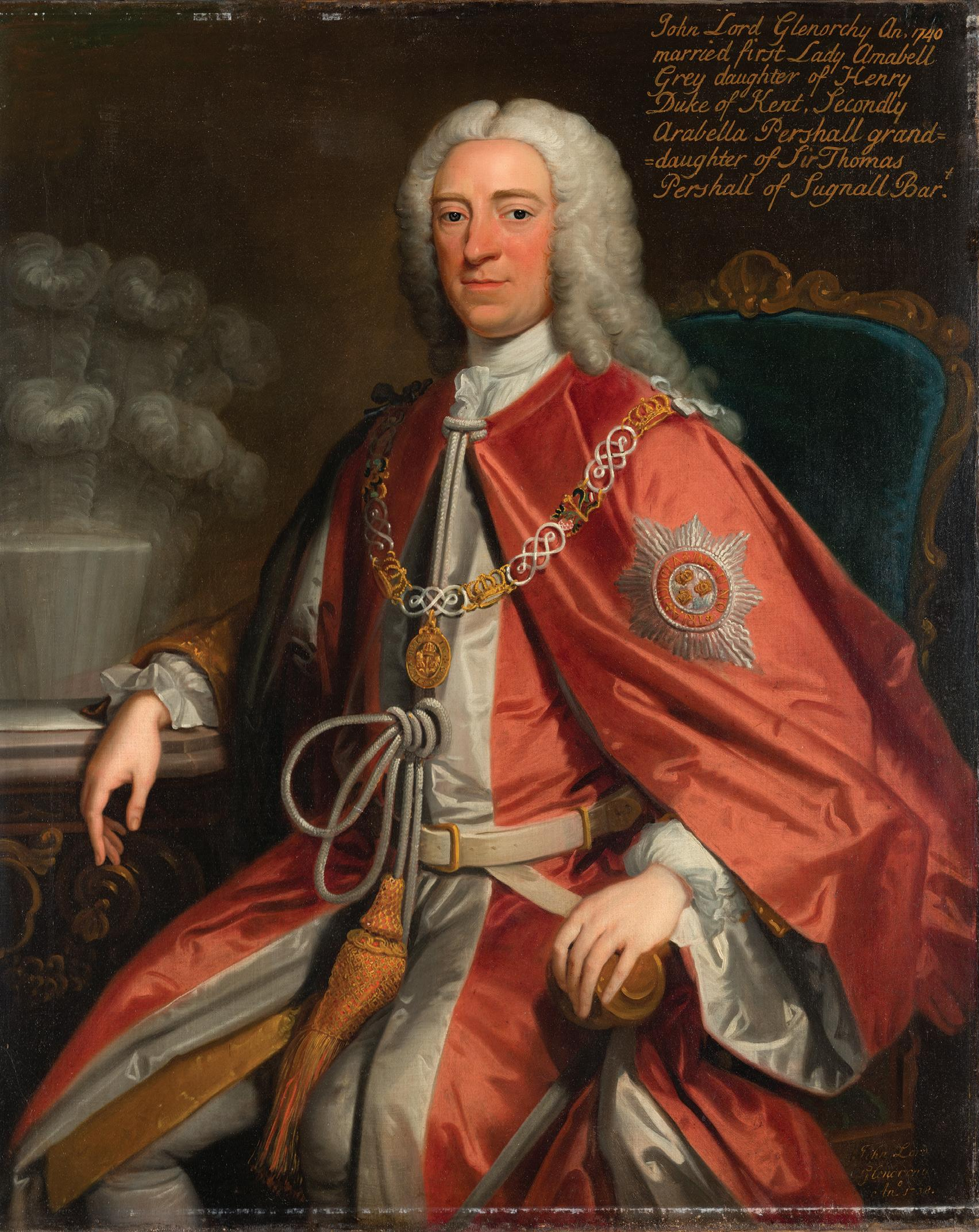
- Portrait by Allan Ramsay, 1738
- Born: 10 March 1696; London, England
- Died: 26 January 1782 (aged 85)
- Occupations: Politician, diplomat

John Campbell, 3rd Earl of Breadalbane and Holland KB (10 March 1696 – 26 January 1782), styled Lord Glenorchy from 1716 until 1752, was a British politician and diplomat who sat in the House of Commons of Great Britain from 1727 to 1746.

== Background and education ==
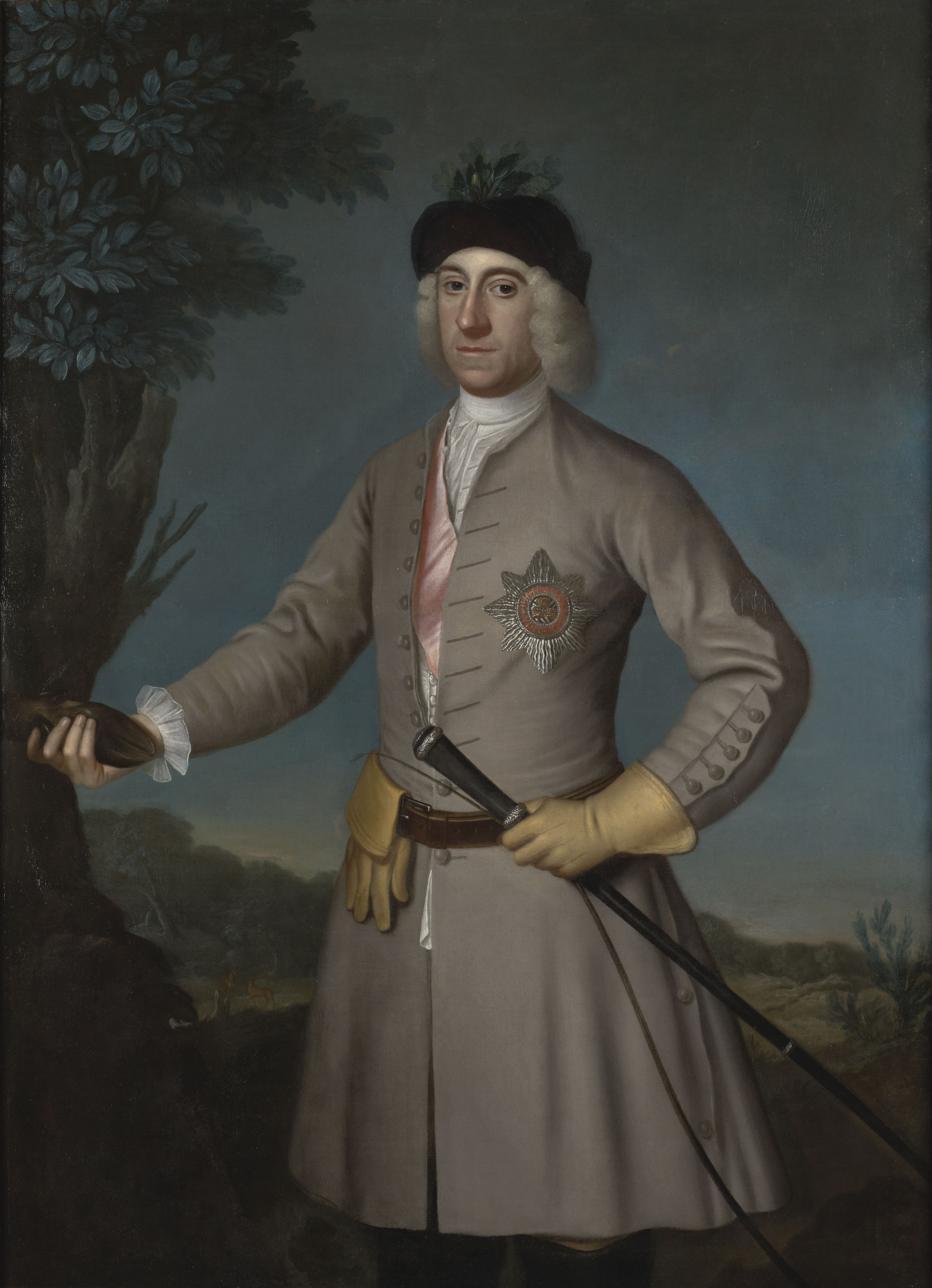
The 3rd Earl of Breadalbane.

Campbell was the son of John Campbell, 2nd Earl of Breadalbane and Holland and Henrietta Villiers, daughter of Sir Edward Villiers, Knight Marshal. He matriculated at Christ Church, Oxford in 1711.

== Political career ==
Campbell was Envoy to Denmark from 1718, and ambassador to the Russian Empire in 1731. He was a Lord of the Admiralty in 1741 until the dissolution of Sir Robert Walpole's government the following year.

Glenorchy was returned as Member of Parliament for Saltash in 1727 and 1734. In April 1739, prompted by the poet and playwright Allan Ramsay, he presented a bill to Parliament for the establishment of a Scottish theatre patent, but withdrew it in the face of strong opposition from Kirk ministers, Edinburgh's city magistrates, and Edinburgh University.

He was returned as MP for Orford in 1741. He was appointed Master of the Jewel Office in 1745 and resigned his seat in the House of Commons. He succeeded his father as Earl of Breadalbane and Holland on 23 February 1752 and became a Scottish representative peer. He graduated as a Doctor of Civil Law (DCL) at the University of Oxford in 1756, and served as Justice in Eyre south of the Trent from 1756 to 1765 and Vice-Admiral of Scotland from 1776.

== Family ==
Lord Breadalbane and Holland was married on 20 February 1717 to Lady Amabel de Grey, a daughter of Henry Grey, 1st Duke of Kent and his wife, the former Jemima Crew. Lady Amabel died on 2 March 1726 leaving 2 children:

- Henry Campbell (c. 1721 - 12 May 1727).
- Jemima Campbell, 2nd Marchioness Grey, 4th Baroness Lucas.

The Earl married a second time to Arbella Pershall on 23 January 1730. They also had 2 children:

- George Campbell, Lord Glenorchy (d. 24 March 1744).
- John Campbell, Lord Glenorchy (20 September 1738 – 14 November 1771) (who married Willielma Maxwell).

Parliament of Great Britain
Preceded by Philip Lloyd; Edward Hughes	MP for Saltash; 1727–1741; With: Philip Lloyd 1727–1734; Thomas Corbett 1734–1741	Succeeded by Thomas Corbett; John Clevland
Preceded by Lewis Barlow; John Cope	MP for Orford; 1741–1746; With: Henry Bilson-Legge	Succeeded by Henry Bilson-Legge; Hon. John Bateman
Political offices
Preceded by Lord Frederick Campbell	Keeper of the Privy Seal of Scotland; 1765–1766	Succeeded by James Stuart-Mackenzie
Preceded by Hon. Henry Clinton	Master of the Jewel Office; 1745–1756	Succeeded by Sir Robert Lyttleton
Military offices
Preceded by The Duke of Queensberry	Vice-Admiral of Scotland; 1776–1782	Succeeded by Lord William Gordon
Legal offices
Preceded by The Lord Sandys	Justice in Eyre south of Trent; 1756–1765	Succeeded by The Lord Monson
Peerage of Scotland
Preceded by John Campbell	Earl of Breadalbane and Holland; 1752–1782	Succeeded by John Campbell
