= Etheldreda Townshend =

Mid-18th century English socialite

The Right Honourable The Viscountess Townshend
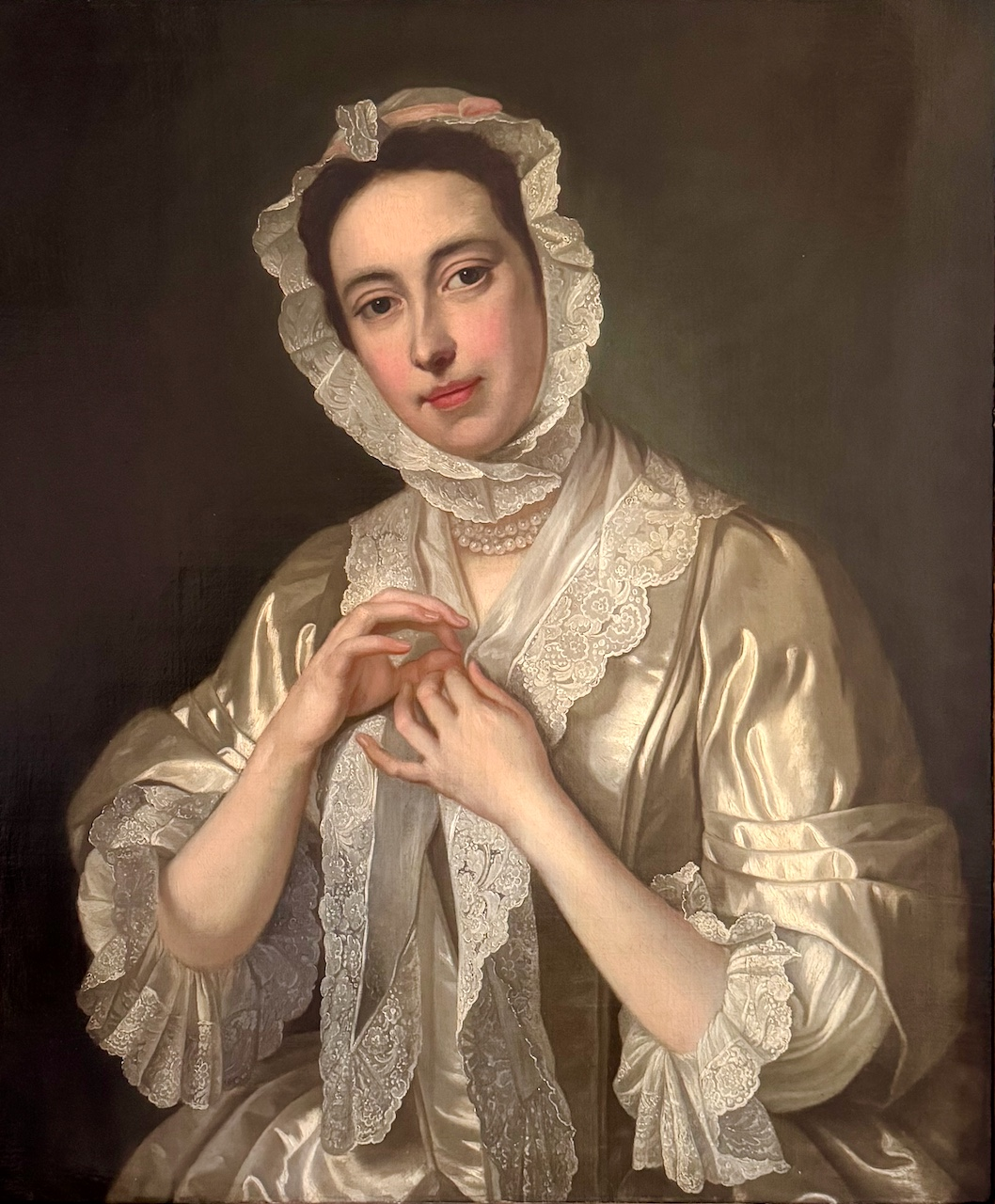
- Portrait by Jean-Baptiste van Loo (c. 1738)
- Born: Audrey Etheldreda Harrison; 1708; Balls Park, Hertfordshire, England
- Died: 5 March 1788 (aged 79–80)
- Known for: Notorious society hostess
- Spouse: Charles Townshend, 3rd Viscount Townshend
- Children: George Townshend, 1st Marquess Townshend; Charles Townshend; Edward Townshend; Colonel Roger Townshend; Audrey Townshend
- Parents: Edward Harrison; Frances Bray

Audrey Etheldreda Townshend, Viscountess Townshend (née Harrison; 1708 – 5 March 1788), was a celebrated English socialite, widely believed to have inspired the character "Lady Bellaston", the notorious fictional seductress in Henry Fielding's The History of Tom Jones, a Foundling.

== Early life ==
"Etheldreda" Harrison was born in 1708 to colonial administrator Edward Harrison and heiress Frances (née Bray). She was born at Balls Park in Hertfordshire, the home of her paternal grandparents, Richard and Audrey Harrison, who had 8 sons and 6 daughters, some of whom were likely resident at the family home as she grew up. Shortly after she was born, Etheldreda's father left home to travel the world, trading with China as a sea captain. He was appointed governor of Fort St George in Madras between 1711 and 1717, returning home in 1717 with a fortune, giving him the financial capacity to be returned as a member of parliament for Weymouth and Melcombe Regis and to completely refurbish the house and grounds of Balls Park.

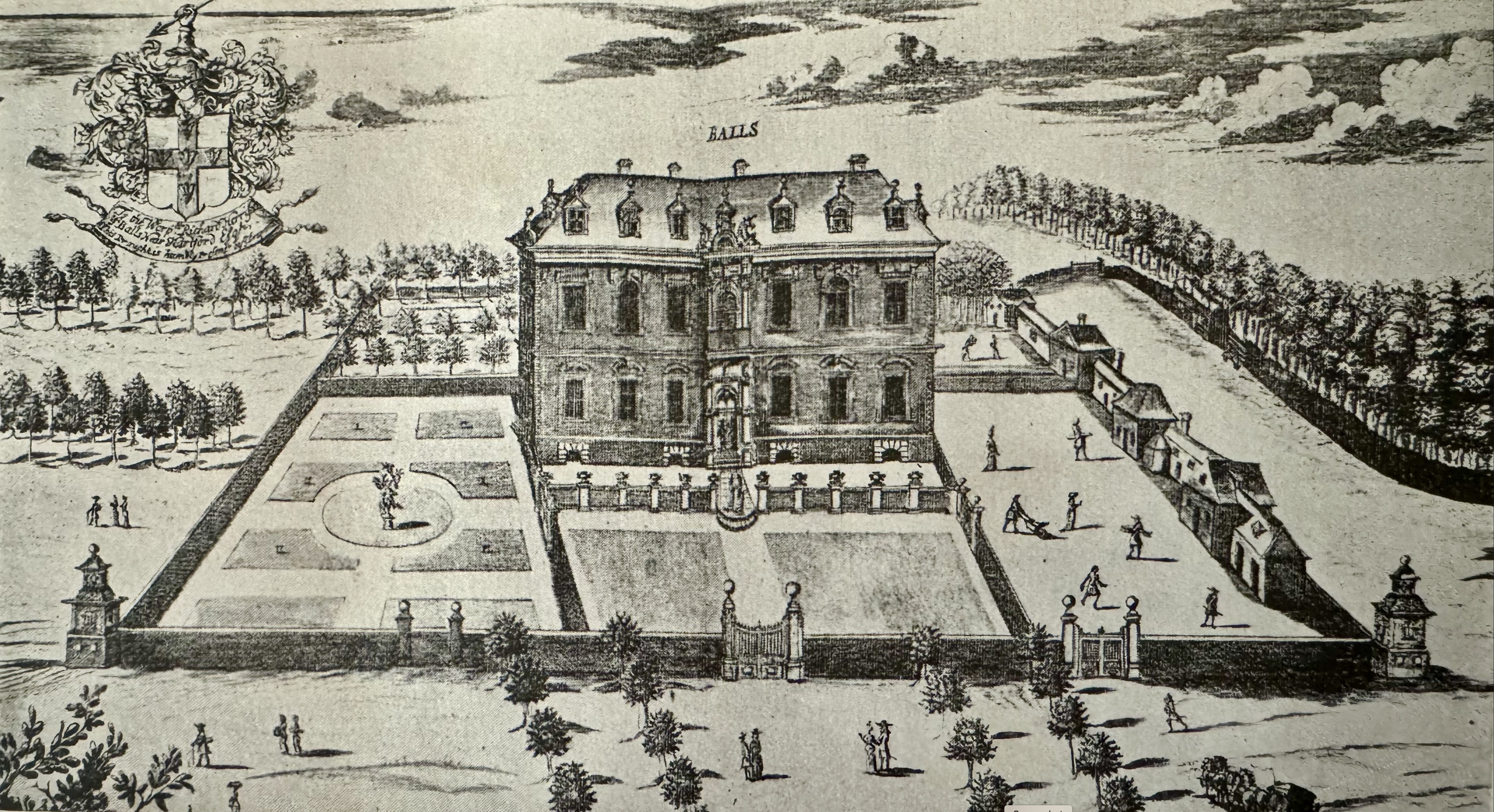
Balls Park where Etheldreda Harrison was born in 1708, which she left to her grandson Lord John Townshend, including a large sum of money to completely refurbish it

The young Etheldreda was the only surviving heir to her father's fortune and estates, which made her an excellent match for social preferment. Young, attractive and vivacious, she was probably over indulged by her family and was eager to escape the confines of Balls Park and explore a wider romantic world. Her father used his position to find a good match and at the age of 15 in 1723, she was married to Lord Lynn, a title hastily conferred on Charles Townshend in lieu of his inheriting his father's Viscountcy. (Note: it is likely that the marriage settlement required Etheldreda to be ennobled on marriage, which prompted the acceleration of Charles to his father's barony of Townshend one week before they were married)

== Lady Lynn ==
Newlyweds Lord and Lady Lynn moved into the Townshend family home at Raynham Hall in Norfolk as guests of Etheldreda's father-in-law Charles Viscount Townshend and his wife Dorothy née Walpole. Lord and Lady Lynn immediately started a family with their first child born in 1724 (George), the second in 1725 (Charles) and a third around 1726 (Edward). Raynham Hall had become afflicted with smallpox, which is thought to have resulted in the death of Lady Dorothy in 1726 and the Lynn's youngest son Edward in 1731. Etheldreda disliked Norfolk (Note: Lady Townshend described Norfolk "as a place where there was nothing to be seen but one blade of grass and two rabbits nibbling at that") and, at the age of eighteen, looked for opportunities to see and be seen in wider society. In 1731, their fourth son Roger was born, followed by a daughter (Audrey). Reportedly, relationships between Lord and Lady Lynn had always been stormy, dining separately, leading separate lives. Lord Lynn had been having an affair with his housemaid, who became his mistress, which was evidently tolerated by the Townshend family on condition that knowledge of the relationship remained within the family at Raynham. Etheldreda, who had formed a dislike for the Townshends, had other ideas.

== Lady Townshend ==
Lady Lynn's father died in 1738, leaving her a substantial independent income worth £2000 a year. (Note: worth in the region of £400,000pa in today's money) She began making frequent visits to London, acquiring the lease to a grand house within the precincts of the Palace of Whitehall in the Privy Gardens, where she was to live in opulent style for the rest of her life. Lord and Lady Lynn remained outwardly together with their children at Raynham Hall, but when the old Viscount died in 1738, Lady Lynn became Viscountess Townshend. The new Lady Townshend immediately made the family rift public. At a time when London was suffering from disease and Lady Townshend was consulted on potential cures, she declared that "the greatest number have found relief from the sudden deaths of their husbands". The new Viscount Townshend remained at Raynham with his mistress but his Lady Townshend left for a fast life in London, where she commissioned French artist van Loo to make several half portraits of herself (at the age of 30, illustrated above), publishing woodcut prints entitled Mrs Townshend. (Note: title "Mrs" was 18th century code denoting "availability") A formal separation was agreed three years later in May 1741.

Lady Townshend had the means and the freedom to host whist salons, mount huge Masquerade balls with lavish hospitality at the Privy Gardens, receiving all that was fashionable and select in society of the day, which became renowned throughout the country. Her extravagant life-style played out in public throughout the 1740s when Henry Fielding was writing his The History of Tom Jones, a Foundling, published in 1749, followed by another parody as Lady Tempest in Francis Coventry's The History of Pompey the Little two years later.

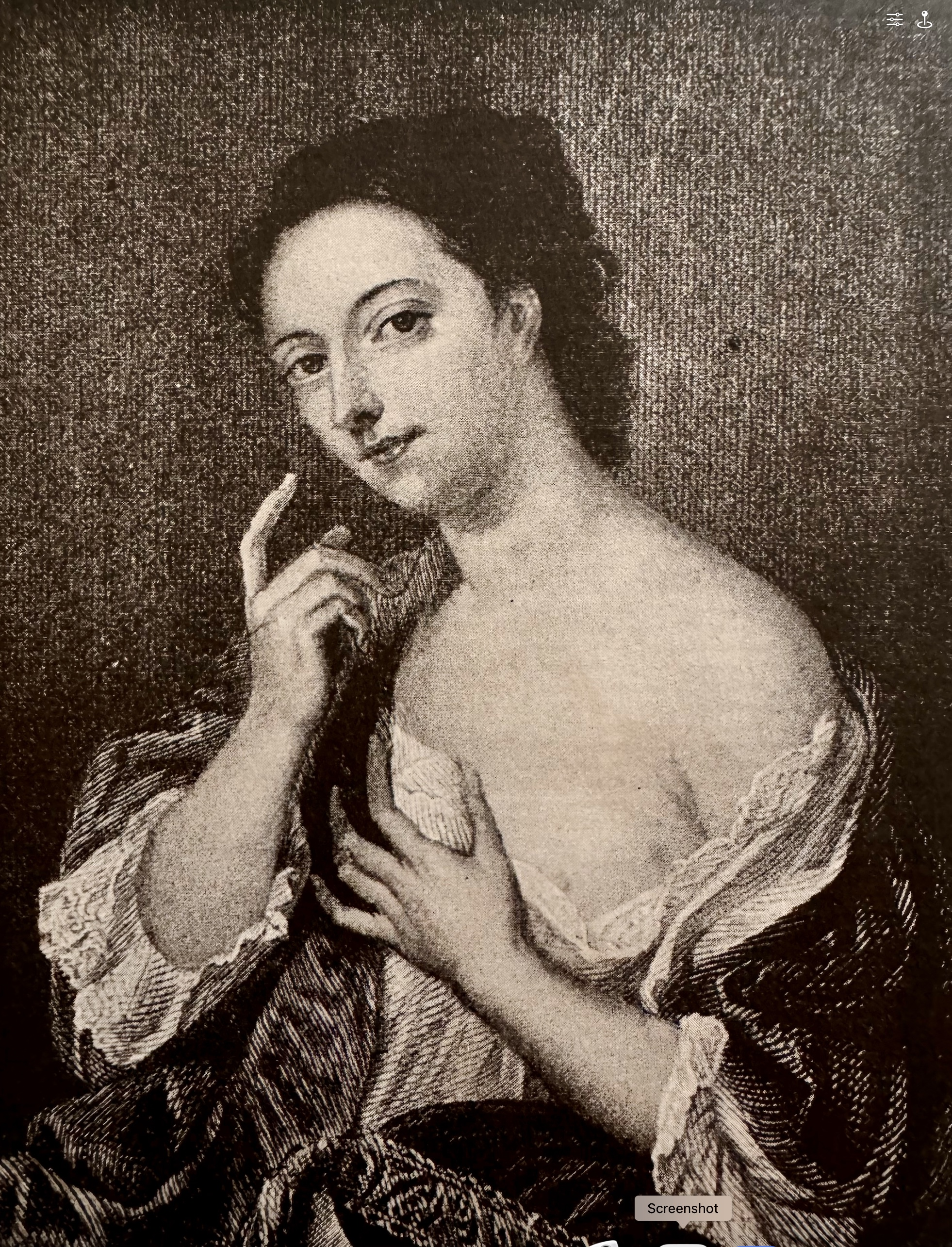
Copy of a miniature of "My Lady Townshend" belonging to Horace Walpole, after Zincke

Lady Townshend was known for her public affairs. Her closest intimates reportedly included Prince William, Duke of Cumberland (the son of King George), Thomas Winnington, sir Harry Nesbit, the youthful Lord Frederick Campbell, (Note: Lady Townshend was also very close friends with his father, John Campbell, 4th Duke of Argyll, who wrote passionately to her even as he was attacking her Jacobite friends) Henry Fox, 1st Baron Holland, Lord Baltimore, the Duke of Newcastle, Sir Charles Hanbury Williams, both the Sir Thomas Robinsons (Grantham and her landlord) (Note: Elizabeth Montagu reported on Lady Townshend's distinction between the two Robinsons, naming one of them "long": "Sir Thomas Robinson was given to him from his great height, and to distinguish him from another Sir Thomas Robinson, a diplomat of note, afterwards created Lord Grantham. These two men were the reverse of each other in appearance, "Long" Sir Thomas being exceptionally tall, and the other very short and fat. One of Lady Townshend's _bon mots_ about the two was, "Why one should be preferred to the other I can't imagine, there is but little difference, the one is as broad as the other is long;" and Lord Chesterfield, on being told "Long" Sir Thomas was reported to be "dying by inches," said, then it would be some time before he was dead.") plus various members of the Hervey family of all ages. She was sought out by lovers and macaroni of the day, like Casanova and Chevalier d'Éon. A celebrated wit of her day, Lady Townshend frequently jousted with her closest friends Horace Walpole, George Montagu and Lady Mary Wortley Montagu (Note: it is uncertain how much affection there was between Lady Mary and Lady Townshend, although Lady Mary in her exile did maintain an unusual interest in Townshend's activities) and George Selwyn, in the golden age of satire in England, as well as more serious commentators like Elizabeth Montagu, Hester Chapone and Mary Delany. Lady Townshend set herself up as an anti-establishment figure, outwardly opposed to the Hanoverian Court, (Note: Horace Walpole reported that Lady Brown had complained to my Lady Townshend that "...it was very well, while you was [sic] only affected; but now that you are disaffected, it is intolerable") projecting herself as a Jacobite, (Note: Lady Townshend apparently "fell in love" with William Boyd when she attended his trial for treason. It is likely that she never actually met him before he was executed but their association added to the belief that Lady Townshend was an armchair Jacobite and was never prosecuted for her anti-establishment beliefs) opposed to the Government of the day under Sir Robert Walpole, Henry Pelham and Government in general, wielding political influence where she could. A notorious libertine, she alternately espoused the Church of England, Methodism and Catholicism at different times. When George Whitefield was conducting the methodist revival with Lady Townshend in attendance, she was asked "Pray Madam, is it true that Whitfield has recanted" to which she replied "No, Sir, he has only canted".

By the time Lady Townshend had become a grandmother in her fifties, she had changed, and society had changed. (Note: Whilst England may have been late to achieving enlightenment, Lady Townshend's social circle was focusing more on intellectual pursuits, suggested by the creation of the Blue Stockings Society in the 1750s) Lady Townshend maintained her position as supplier of society gossip, (Note: Horace Walpole referred to her updates as "My Lady Townshend's extempore gazette") but there was less scandal coming from the Privy Gardens. Days after Lady Townshend's husband died in 1764, Lord Bath proposed to her, effectively offering her his vast fortune. She must have declined because the noble Earl died a few months later, with his fortune eventually settling on a cousin three years later. (Note: Lady Townshend was worth £4,500pa by then, "a very rich widow" - she died leaving estates in Hertfordshire, Norfolk and Suffolk, a bureaus stuffed with 8,000 guineas in cash at the Privy Gardens, with £12,000 at the bank.) In the 1760s, her friendships tended to reflect a change in interests, including many notable LGBT ladies of the day, from her own cousin Caroline to Mie-Mie Fagnani. At the age of 73, Lady Townshend was still hosting events in public, described at the time in the first edition of the satirical book The Abbey of Kilkhampton by Sir Herbert Croft as:

Indulge the Tribute of a pitying Tear In kind Remembrance of her who was once the fair, the blooming Lady V .........sT.......d. Born and educated without the Prospect of rising beyond the Level of Mediocrity She cultivated the sincerest Charms that could assist in finishing A Model of the loveliest Perfection. The Elegance of her Attractions captivated the Heart, while the Artless Innocence of her Conversation improved the Felicity of those who gazed on the soft Lustre of her Beauties with Rapture and Admiration. The Nobleman who was induced to espouse her, kept guard over the Treasure he possessed, with a Warmth of Affection that did Honour to her Virtues, Though it robbed her of that unsuspected Freedom of Sentiment Which Youth and Beauty part from with Reluctance. She lived, beloved without Jealousy by the Young and Gay, Admired without Envy by the more rigid of her Sex, and Distinguished with Tokens of sincere Veneration From all who knew the Refinement of her Accomplishments.

Evidently she lost none of her spark or mental acuity in old age and remained controversial to her last breath.

== Family ==
Lady Townshend was said to have disliked the Townshend family but for all of her apparent self-indulgence in London, the evidence would suggest that she kept her children close, while their father distanced himself from them. George and Charles were attending either Cambridge University or Eton College when she left Raynham but daughter Audrey (and potentially Roger) joined her in London. Lady Townshend included all her family in some of her more spectacular events at the Privy Gardens, even staging plays for friends and family such as Cato. (Note: Lady Townshend's grandson Charles, who played Cato himself for the play, turned out to be an acting talent with real stage potential, tutored by his loving father, who had died two years previously) Her children did lead full and independent lives, sometimes critical of their mother, (Note: they rebelled as some children do: George was a hard military man, who inherited his mothers hedonistic tendencies, while Charles was a gentle more cerebral man who had inherited his mother's wit, and Audrey, beautiful but faithful, eloped with an honourable soldier but without her mother's blessing) but always supportive. None of the children seemed to have cared much for their father.

Having lost her mother in 1758, (Note: Frances Harrison may have been visiting her daughter in Whitehall when in 1736, her coach overturned near her house. She suffered a severe brain injury from which she was not expected to recover, although she survived for another twenty years. It is uncertain whether she remained with her daughter or not but she left her estate to her daughter in 1758.) Lady Townshend was heart-broken when Roger was killed in 1759, which she commemorated with an extravagant memorial at Westminster Abbey. All of her children pre-deceased her, except George, who gave her grandchildren, providing renewed attention after the tragic loss of Roger. She particularly favoured her second grandson Jock. In the same year, Lady Townshend's uncle George Harrison died, leaving her Ball's Park, which in turn she left to Jock. When Viscount Townshend died in 1764, he left his considerable estate of £50,000 to his mistress, effectively disinheriting his children with Lady Townshend. (Note: in the region of £10 million in today's money)

== Legacy ==
Lady Townshend died on 5 March 1788. She maintained the same level of energy and intellectual authenticity all of her life, wielding influence with powerful men and women of the day. Described as "a frolicsome dame", it is not certain how typical she was of her generation during a time when social media defined notability, rewarded by public commentary both lionising and vilifying. Errol Sherson, her biographer and a descendant of Lady Townshend, doubts whether Fielding actually based the character of Lady Bellaston on Lady Townshend, which is less important biographically than the fact that many of those who knew her believed it. She did, however, provide the foundations for the continuation of the Townshend dynasty, which survives to the present day. (Note: Lady Townshend kept the family together as tragedy struck again in 1767, when her celebrated statesman son Charles Townshend died, leaving his family poorly provided for. In an unusual act of generosity, his elder brother George, suggested to Lady Townshend that she leave her considerable fortune to his brother's children. Evidently these children also predeceased her, so the bulk of her wealth went to grandson Jock (Lord John Townshend) and the eldest grandson the Earl of Leicester, with generous endowments to her three remaining grand children.)
