= Ann, Lady Fanshawe =

English writer (1625–1680)

Ann Fanshawe, Lady Fanshawe
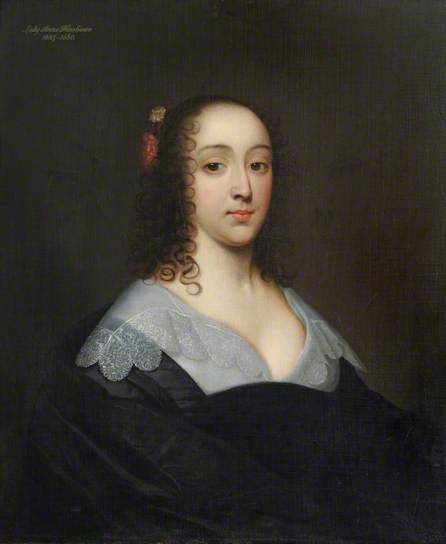
- Ann, Lady Fanshawe, by Cornelis Janssens van Ceulen
- Born: Ann Harrison; 25 March 1625 parish of St Olave Hart Street, London, England
- Died: 20 January 1680 (aged 54) probably at Ware, Hertfordshire, England
- Resting place: Ware, Hertfordshire
- Occupation: writer
- Spouse: Sir Richard Fanshawe, 1st Baronet (m. 1644)
- Relatives: Sir John Harrison (father)
- Writing career
- Language: English
- Genres: memoir, recipes
- Notable work: Memoir

Ann Fanshawe, Lady Fanshawe (25 March 1625 – 20 January 1680) was an English memoirist and author best known for her memoirs written during the English Civil War. A recipe for ice cream in her 1665 book is thought to be the earliest recorded in Europe.

Her recipe for "icy cream" is recorded as follows: "Take three pints of the best cream, boil it with a blade of Mace or else perfume it with orange flower water or Ambergreece, sweeten the Cream, with sugar let it stand till it is quite cold, then put it into Boxes, ether of Silver or tinn, then take, Ice chopped into small pieces and put it into a tub and set the Boxes in the Ice covering them all over, and let them stand in the Ice two hours, and the Cream Will come to be Ice in the Boxes, then turn them out into a salvar with some of the same seasoned Cream, so serve it up to the Table."

== Early life and education ==
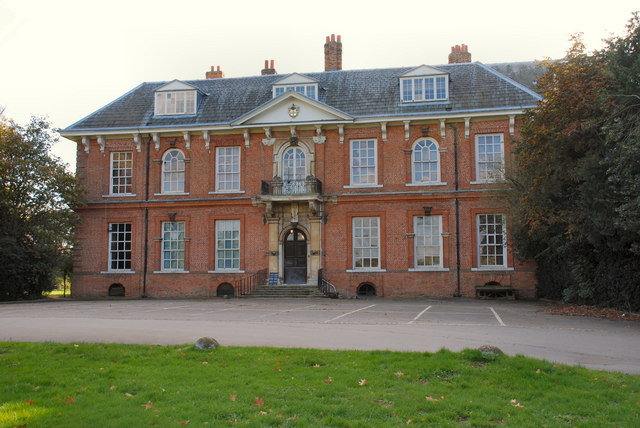
Balls Park

Ann (or Anne) Harrison was born on 25 March 1625 in the parish of St Olave Hart Street, London. She was the eldest daughter of Sir John Harrison of Hertfordshire and Margaret Fanshawe and great grandchild of Christopher Gardiner of Urswick, Lancashire. She had three brothers and a sister. Her childhood was spent in London and at Balls Park, Hertford.

Her mother took great pains with her education, directing her attention more especially to domestic usefulness. Fanshawe liked not only French, needlework and music, but she also enjoyed riding and running. She described herself with hindsight as "what we graver people call a hoyting girle."

Her mother died in July 1640, when Fanshawe was fifteen years old. Following her death, Fanshawe was left capable of managing her father's household with discretion and economy. Her father remarried, and had a son and a daughter by his second wife.

Scholars have studied Ann Fanshawe's early life as a significant influence on her later writing. Fanshawe's upbringing in a Royalist household influenced her ideas on how she viewed family, politics, and personal responsibility during the English Civil War. Her education included household skills, literacy, and social behavior which was typical for women in her social class. Fanshawe's experiences with motherhood and family loss played a huge role in her writing, particularly her emotional reflections on grief and survival. These early experiences influenced and shaped her memoir.

== Career ==
Ann's family was Royalist and they moved with the court to Oxford during the English Civil War. However, since her father was a fierce royalist the war brought hardships upon her family when the war broke out. They ultimately had to flee to Oxford where they resided. Her memoir she wrote provides great detail on the lifestyle and hardships her family endured during the time. In 1644, at the age of nineteen, she married at Wolvercote near Oxford, her second cousin, Richard (later Sir Richard) Fanshawe (1608–1666). He was also Royalist and was secretary of war to Prince Charles. They had 14 children, of whom four daughters and a son survived into adulthood.

In 1645, she accompanied Fanshawe to Spain, where he became Secretary to the British Embassy. Upon returning to England, her husband supported himself strenuously in the cause of Charles I of England. He was taken prisoner at the Battle of Worcester in 1651, and for a time closely confined. His wife, not being permitted to visit him, exposed herself to great hardships in order to alleviate his painful solitude by standing to converse with him outside his window in the middle of the night and in bad weather. On his release, they withdrew to Tankersley Park, in Yorkshire, where he occupied himself with poetry and literature, and his wife turned to writing as well. A book of cookery and medicaments was compiled by Lady Fanshawe, the earliest entries, by an amanuensis, dating from 1651. Her recipe for ice cream is thought to be the earliest recorded in Europe.

Fanshawe's memoir is considered an important example of early modern women's autobiographical writing. Her writing shows how women in diplomatic families were involved in political life in indirect ways through travel, attending events, and managing the household. Her memoir also explains court life, customs, and political events in detail, which gives insight into the seventeenth century. Scholars explain that her writing has both personal experiences, and political experiences, due to her Royalist background.

During Fanshawe's travels with her husband, she wrote about her experiences in Spain, and France, giving insight into the travel conditions during the English Civil War era. These travel experiences exposed her to different political environments, and cultural traditions. Although Fanshawe did not hold a political position, her writing reflects her understanding of diplomacy through her lived experiences. Her observations of court life, clothing, and customs, show how women like her contributed to documenting and explaining political life around them.

They spent the latter years of the Civil War and the Interregnum travelling, for instance to Caen, Paris, The Hague, Ireland, Madrid, and Flanders, as well as London, Yorkshire, Huntingdonshire, Hertfordshire and Bath, Somerset. Richard published translations and kept in touch with the royal family. The family joined Charles II in Flanders, Richard was appointed Latin secretary and master of requests, and knighted at Breda in 1656.

After the Restoration, Richard represented the University of Cambridge in Parliament, went to Portugal to help broker Charles II's marriage to Catherine of Braganza, and served as ambassador to Portugal (1662–63) and to Spain (1664–1666). Richard died suddenly in 1666 in Madrid, after which, the widow and her family returned to England. In the first anguish of bereavement, she was exposed to such distressing poverty that she long wanted pecuniary means to deliver his remains to the tomb of his ancestors, and to maintain support of her children. Sir Richard's salary was in arrear, and no remittances could be obtained from the Ministers of the profligate King. The Queen of Spain offered Lady Fanshawe and her five children a handsome provision, on condition of their conforming to the Roman Catholic Church, but the widow withstood the temptation, even while the embalmed corpse of her husband lay daily in her sight. Means were furnished at last by the Queen Dowager of Spain, the removal to England was effected, and Sir Richard's remains were interred within the chapel of St. Mary in the church of Ware.

== Later life ==
In widowhood, Fanshawe devoted herself to the education of her children, to acts of benevolence, and to self-improvement. In 1676, Fanshawe transcribed the manuscript Memoir of her husband (now held in the British Library) for private family circulation. It was addressed to their son Richard and began with conventional biblical and other admonitions. It is interspersed with descriptions of Richard's character as one for his son to emulate, it provides a colourful account of their adventures, and carefully observed details of clothing and customs encountered in their travels. It was also intended to vindicate the family's financial claims against the government and ends abruptly in 1671. There is a modern edition of the Memoir.

Scholars often describe Fanshawe's writing as an example of the seventeenth century women's life writing, which were shaped by household responsibilities and political experiences.

== Death and legacy ==
She died on 20 January 1680, in Ware, Hertfordshire, where she was buried at St Mary's Church. There is a portrait in oils of Lady Fanshawe by Cornelis Janssens van Ceulen held at the Valence House Museum in Dagenham, London, a gift from a descendant in 1963.

Modern scholars discuss Ann Fanshawe as an important figure in early English literature and women's history. Fanshawe's writing provides valuable insight into how women expressed themselves, their emotions, and their strength during the times of political and personal adversity. Her memoirs are studied not only for their historical detail, but also for its contribution to understanding women's roles in early modern history. In addition, her recipe writings, contribute to her legacy as both a household writer and historical writer.

== Style and themes ==
The following extract of her Memoir shows her character as well as her husband's:

And now I thought myself a perfect queen, and my husband so glorious a crown that I more valued myself to be called by his name than if I had been a princess; for I knew him very wise and very good, and that his soul doted on me; upon which confidence I will tell you what happened. My Lady Rivers, a brave woman, and one that had suffered many thousand pounds loss for the King, for whom I had a great reverence, and she a kinswoman's kindness for me, in discourse tacitly commended the knowledge of State affairs; she mentioned several women who were very happy in a good understanding thereof, and said none of them was originally more capable than 1. She said a post would arrive from Paris from the Queen that night, and she should extremely like to know what news it brought—adding, if I would ask my husband privately, he would tell me what he found in the packet, and I might tell her. I, that was young and innocent, and to that day had never in my mouth 'What news?' now began to think there was more in inquiry into public affairs than I had thought of; and that, being a fashionable thing, it would make me more beloved of my husband than I already was, if that had been possible. When my husband returned home from the council, after receiving my welcome, he went with his hands full of papers into his study. I followed him; he turned hastily, and said, 'What wouldst thou have, my life?' I told him I heard the Prince had received a packet from the Queen, and I guessed he had it in his hand, and I desired to know what was in it. He smilingly replied, 'My love, I will immediately come to thee; pray thee go, for I am very busy.' When he came out of his closet I renewed my suit; he kissed me, and talked of other things. At supper I would eat nothing; he as usual sat by me, and drank often to me, which was his custom, and was full of discourse to company that was at table. Going to bed I asked him again, and said I could never believe he loved me, if he refused to tell me all he knew. He answered nothing, but stopped my mouth with kisses. I cried, and he went to sleep. Next morning very early, as his custom was, he called to rise, but began to discourse with me first, to which I made no reply; he rose, came on the other side of the bed, kissed me, drew the curtains softly, and went to court. When he came home to dinner, he presently came to me as was usual, and when I had him by the hand, I said, 'Thou dost not care to see me troubled;' to which he, taking me in his arms, answered: 'My dearest soul, nothing on earth can afflict me like that; when you asked me of my business it was wholly out of my power to satisfy thee: my life, my fortune, shall be thine, and every thought of my heart in which the trust I am in may not be revealed; but my honour is my own, which I cannot preserve if I communicate the Prince's affairs. I pray thee with this answer rest satisfied.' So great was his reason and goodness that, upon consideration, it made my folly appear to me so vile that, from that day until the day of his death, I never thought fit to ask him any business, except what be communicated freely to me in order to his estate or family.
