= Thomas Clarke (died 1754) =

British Lawyer

Sir Thomas Clarke (c. 1672–1754), of Brickendon, Hertfordshire, was a British lawyer and Whig politician who sat in the English and British House of Commons between 1705 and 1741.

== Early life ==
Clarke was the eldest son of Sir Edward Clarke of St. Vedast's, London, Lord Mayor of London, and his second wife Jane Clutterbuck, daughter of Richard Clutterbuck. He was admitted at St Catharine's College, Cambridge on 20 March 1689 and at Middle Temple on 17 March 1690. He married Elizabeth Pinfold, daughter of Alexander Pinfold of Hoxton, Middlesex on. 9 January 1699. Clarke may be the ‘Thomas Clerk’ who was named with his brother-in-law, Maynard Colchester as one of the founding members of the Society of the Propagation of the Gospel in 1701. They had both been educated at the Middle Temple and shared an interest in landscape gardening. In 1703 he succeeded his father to Brickendon, and assumed the role of a county country gentleman. In 1704 he became Freeman of Hertford. He carried out charitable works in his neighbourhood among which he ‘built a gallery in the church, set up chimes in the steeple, put 90 poor children to school, gave bibles, catechisms etc., and distributed half-peck loaves and two oxen among the poor at Christmas’.

== Career ==
Clarke probably met William Cowper, at Middle Temple. Soon after coming of age he stood for Parliament at Hertford at the 1705 general election on the Cowper interest. Though defeated in the poll, he petitioned and was seated as a Whig Member of Parliament on 6 December 1705. In the House, he supported the Government, in February 1706, on the ‘place clause’ of the regency bill but made little other impression in the House. After presenting an address from his borough congratulating the Queen on the Duke of Marlborough's victory, he was knighted on 24 July 1706. He was called to the bar in 1706 and became a practicing lawyer. He was re-elected MP for Hertford at the 1708 general election and was appointed Commissioner for Charitable Uses at Hertford. He was listed as a Whig, and during the 1708 Parliament he followed the party line, supporting the naturalization of the Palatines in 1709. He was a teller for committing the bill for restraining buildings on new foundations on 10 March 1709 and voted for the impeachment of Sacheverell in 1710. He was defeated by the resurgent Tory interest at the 1710 general election and again in 1713.

Clarke regained his seat at Hertford after the Hanoverian succession. At the 1715 general election he was again defeated in the poll but seated on petition on 24 May 1715. He generally acted with the government. For the third time at the 1722 general election he was defeated at the poll and seated on petition on 22 January 1723. In 1723 he became a bencher of his Inn. He was returned unopposed at the 1727 general election. He supported the Government, except on the civil list arrears in 1729 and on the later stages of the excise bill, having originally voted for it. In 1731 he became Treasurer of his Inn. He was returned unopposed for Hertford again in 1734 but retired at the 1741 general election.

== Death and legacy ==
Clarke died without issue on 26 October 1754, and left his estate to his niece Jane Morgan, wife of Thomas Morgan of Ruperra, Glamorgan.

Parliament of England
Preceded by Charles Caesar; Richard Goulston	Member of Parliament for Hertford; 1705–1707; With: Charles Caesar	Succeeded by Parliament of Great Britain
Parliament of Great Britain
Preceded by Parliament of England	Member of Parliament for Hertford; 1707–1710; With: Charles Caesar 1707-1708; William Monson 1708-1710	Succeeded by Charles Caesar; Richard Goulston
Preceded by Charles Caesar; Richard Goulston	Member of Parliament for Hertford; 1715–1722; With: John Boteler	Succeeded by Edward Harrison; Charles Caesar
Preceded by Edward Harrison; Charles Caesar	Member of Parliament for Hertford; 1723–1741; With: Edward Harrison; George Harrison1727; Nathaniel Brassey 1734	Succeeded by Nathaniel Brassey; George Harrison
