= Joseph Hinxman =

British lawyer and politician

Joseph Hinxman (c. 1701–1740), of the New Forest, Hampshire, was a British lawyer and politician who sat in the House of Commons from 1727 to 1740.

Hinxman was the eldest son of Joseph Hinxman of North Hinton, Hampshire. He was educated at Winchester College from 1715 to 1719 and was admitted at Lincoln's Inn on 24 June 1720. He matriculated at Trinity College, Oxford on 28 February 1721, aged 19 and was called to the bar in 1727. He owned the manor of North Hinton, near Christchurch and married Beata.

Hinxman stood unsuccessfully for Christchurch at a by-election in 1724. At the 1727 British general election, he was returned as Member of Parliament for Christchurch in a contest. He voted with the Administration in all recorded divisions. He was returned unopposed for Christchurch at the 1734 British general election. He was sometime woodward and keeper of the New Forest.

Hinxman died on 21 March 1740, leaving three sons and two daughters.

Parliament of Great Britain
Preceded by Jacob Banks; Edward Prideaux Gwyn	Member of Parliament for Christchurch; 1727–1740; With: Charles Wither 1727-1732; Philip Lloyd 1732-1734; Edward Hooper 1734-1740	Succeeded by Charles Armand Powlett; Edward Hooper
