= Richard Harrison (died 1726) =

English politician

Member of Parliament
- In office 1669; 1679

Personal details
- Born: 1646
- Died: 1726 (aged 79–80)
- Spouse: Audrey Villiers (m. 1668)
- Children: 14, including Edward, George and Thomas
- Parent: Sir John Harrison (father)
- Relatives: Lady Ann Fanshawe (sister); William Harrison (half-brother); George Villiers (father-in-law); Edward Hughes (son-in-law)
- Education: Peterhouse, Cambridge

Richard Harrison (1646–1726) was an English politician.

== Biography ==
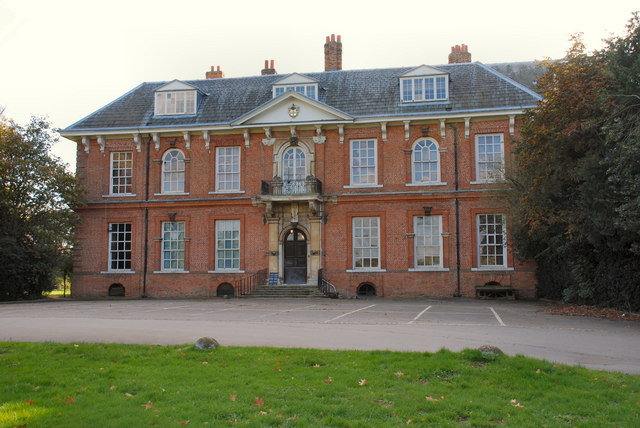
Balls Park, Hertford

He was the eldest surviving son of Sir John Harrison of Balls Park, Hertford, Member of Parliament for Lancaster, by his second wife Mary Shotbolt; William Harrison was his half-brother but had predeceased their father in 1643. Richard was educated at Peterhouse, Cambridge, where he matriculated in 1663 and was admitted to the Middle Temple that same year.

Harrison was elected Member of Parliament in 1669, and again in 1679. Thought to favour the court in the Exclusion Crisis, he did not support James II on the throne. After the Glorious Revolution he was a non-juror.

== Family ==
Harrison married in 1668 Audrey, daughter of George Villiers, 4th Viscount Grandison; they had eight sons and six daughters.

- Edward was born in 1674; he became President of Madras, then Member of Parliament for Weymouth, and for Hertford
- George (born 1680) was the second surviving son (born fifth), and succeeded Edward as Member of Parliament for Hertford in 1727.
- Thomas (born 1681), the sixth son, was Member of Parliament for Old Sarum from 1728.
- Elizabeth married Edward Hughes, Member of Parliament for Saltash, in 1713.
