= Thomas Corbett (civil servant) =

British Treasury official and politician

Member of Parliament for Saltash
- In office 6 February 1734 – 30 April 1751
- Preceded by: Edward Hughes
- Succeeded by: George Rodney

Personal details
- Born: 1687
- Died: 30 April 1751 (aged 63–64)
- Spouse: Mary Lloyd (m. 1740)
- Children: 1
- Education: Westminster School

Thomas Corbett (c. 1687– 30 April 1751) of Nash, Pembrokeshire, was a British Treasury official and politician who sat in the House of Commons from 1734 to 1751.

Corbett was the eldest son of William Corbett of Nanteos, Cardiganshire, and Middle Temple and his wife Eleanor Jones, daughter of Colonel John Jones of Nanteos. He was educated at Westminster School in 1701 as a Kings Scholar.

Corbett joined the navy as an ordinary seaman in 1704, serving under Admiral Sir George Byng as a clerk from 1704 to 1705, and as a secretary from 1705 to 1709. In 1711, he became Byng's personal secretary and trusted assistant. In 1712, when he was at Utrecht, he tried unsuccessfully to obtain the post of secretary to Lord Strafford. He was appointed a clerk in the Admiralty in 1715, when Byng was re-appointed to the board of the Admiralty and secretary to Greenwich Hospital in 1716. He accompanied Byng during the expedition to Sicily from 1718 to 1720 and afterwards published an account. In 1723, he was promoted chief clerk over the heads of all other staff when Byng was Treasurer of the navy, and was made deputy secretary in 1728, when Byng became first lord.

Corbett was returned as Member of Parliament for Saltash on the Admiralty interest at a by-election on 6 February 1734, and was again successful at the 1734 British general election. He spoke on 23 April 1735 for the Government against an opposition bill limiting the number of officers in the House of Commons, and in an army debate on 18 February 1737. On 16 November 1739 he opposed a bill moved by Pulteney awarding all prize-money to officers and seamen of the Royal Navy. On 1 February 1740, he defended the navy estimates. In 1740 he was appointed Secretary to the Court of assistants for relief of poor widows of navy officers, at £200 p.a. He was returned again at the 1741 British general election. In 1741 he was appointed joint secretary to the Admiralty, until he succeeded Josiah Burchett as Secretary to the Admiralty in 1742. He was returned again as MP for Saltash at the 1747 British general election but in his role at the Admiralty, had become so infirm that John Clevland was appointed joint secretary to help him with the Admiralty business.

Corbett married Mary Lloyd of Duke Street, London, on 31 January 1740. He died on 30 April 1751 leaving one daughter.

Parliament of Great Britain
Preceded by Lord Glenorchy; Edward Hughes	Member of Parliament for Saltash; 1734–1751; With: Lord Glenorchy; John Clevland 1741-1743; Stamp Brooksbank 1743-1747; Edward Boscawen 1747; Stamp Brooksbank 1747-1751	Succeeded by Stamp Brooksbank; George Brydges Rodney
