= Nathaniel Brassey =

British banker and politician

Nathaniel Brassey (c. 1697–1765) of Roxford, Hertingfordbury, Hertfordshire and Lombard St., London was a British banker and politician who sat in the House of Commons from 1734 to 1761.

Brassey was the eldest son of John Brassey, a Quaker banker of Lombard Street, and his wife Mary Lane. His father was an assistant in the Sword Blade Company and traded with his son-in-law, Sir George Caswall, as a banker under the name Brassey and Caswall. Brassey was his father's partner in the banking firm by 1716 . His first wife was Mary. By 1730 the banking firm was known as Nathaniel Brassey and Lee. In 1737, Brassey succeeded his father, who by his purchase of Roxford, near Hertford in 1700, had established an electoral interest in Hertford.

Brassey stood for Parliament at St Albans at a by-election in 1730, but was defeated in a contest. He was returned unopposed as Member of Parliament for Hertford at the 1734 British general election. In 1739 he was one of the Members chosen to prepare a bill to prevent fraud and abuses in gold and silver wares. As a result, he received the thanks of the Goldsmiths’ Company for his ‘indefatigable pains’ Also in 1739, with other Hertfordshire Members, he supported a motion for the repeal of the Test Act. Otherwise, he voted regularly with the Government. He was returned unopposed again as MP for Hertford in 1741 and 1747.

Brassey was re-elected unopposed at the 1754 British general election. He continued to support the administration. In 1757, he subscribed £10,000 to the loan. He did not stand again at the 1761 British general election.

Brassey married as his second wife Martha Phillips on 17 October 1751. He died on 29 September 1765, aged 68 leaving a daughter by his first marriage and a son by his second.

Parliament of Great Britain
Preceded by George Harrison; Sir Thomas Clarke	Member of Parliament for Hertford; 1734–1761; With: Sir Thomas Clarke; George Harrison; George Cowper	Succeeded by John Calvert; Timothy Caswall
