= Philip Lloyd =

Philip Lloyd (died 1735), of Grosvenor Street, Westminster, and Bardwin, Northumberland, was a British Army officer and politician who sat in the House of Commons between 1723 and 1735.

Lloyd was a Captain in Colonel Lucas's Foot in 1715. He was returned unopposed as Member of Parliament (MP) for Saltash by Philip Wharton, 1st Duke of Wharton, at a by-election on 5 February 1723 after lavish entertainments which were never paid for. In 1724, he eloped with a Miss Cade, who had ‘£5,000 while he was relatively penniless. In 1726, he became captain in the 7th Dragoons.

Although Lloyd had been returned as an Opposition MP, he changed sides to support Walpole and sought financial assistance from Walpole at the 1727 British general election, when he was elected MP for Aylesbury. He went onto half pay in 1729 and was appointed equerry to George II in 1730, holding the post for the rest of his life. On his appointment, he had to stand for re-election at Aylesbury and lost his seat on 6 February 1730.

Lloyd was returned unopposed as MP for Christchurch by the Administration at a by-election on 22 January 1732. At the 1734 British general election he was again returned unopposed by the Administration as MP for Lostwithiel. He voted with the Administration on every recorded occasion.

Lloyd died on 18 March 1735.

Parliament of Great Britain
Preceded by Thomas Swanton; Edward Hughes	Member of Parliament for Saltash; 1723–1727; With: Edward Hughes	Succeeded by Edward Hughes; Lord Glenorchy
Preceded by John Guise; Richard Abell	Member of Parliament for Aylesbury; 1727–1730; With: Edward Rudge	Succeeded by Edward Rudge; Thomas Ingoldsby
Preceded by Charles Wither; Joseph Hinxman	Member of Parliament for Christchurch; 1732–1734; With: Joseph Hinxman	Succeeded by Edward Hooper; Joseph Hinxman
Preceded by Edward Walpole; Anthony Cracherode	Member of Parliament for Lostwithiel; 1734–1735; With: Richard Edgcumbe	Succeeded by Richard Edgcumbe; Matthew Ducie Moreton
