= Charles Townshend, 3rd Viscount Townshend =

British politician

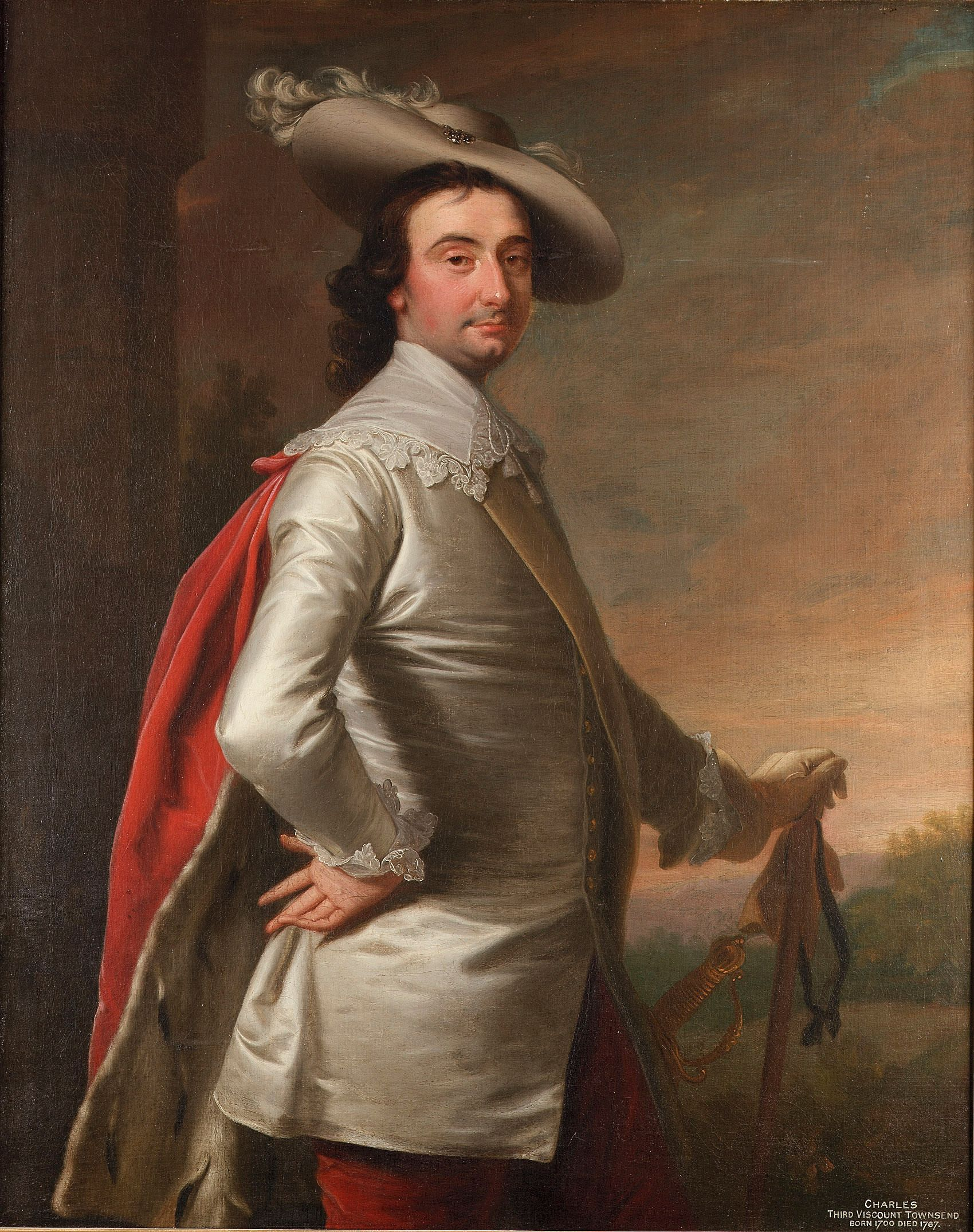
Charles, 3rd Viscount Townshend, painting attributed to Thomas Hudson

Charles Townshend, 3rd Viscount Townshend (11 July 1700 – 12 March 1764), known as The Lord Lynn from 1723 to 1738, was a British politician who sat in the House of Commons from 1722 to 1723 when he was elevated to the House of Lords by writ of acceleration.

== Early life ==
Townshend was the eldest son of the Charles Townshend, 2nd Viscount Townshend and his first wife Elizabeth Pelham, daughter of Thomas Pelham, 1st Baron Pelham, MP. He was educated at Eton and was admitted at King's College, Cambridge in 1718. He then undertook a Grand Tour.

== Career ==
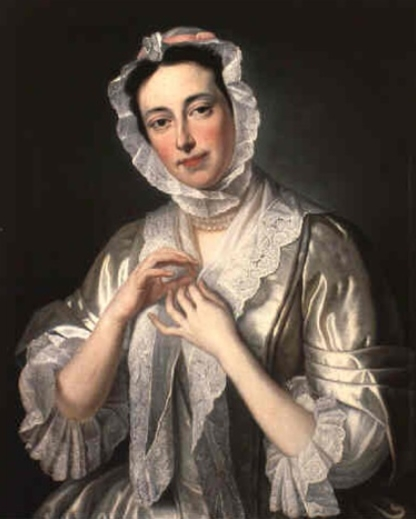
Portrait of Ethelreda Harrison by Jean-Baptiste van Loo. n.d.

Townsend entered the Commons when he succeeded his uncle as Member of Parliament (MP) for Great Yarmouth at the 1722 general election. He held the seat until a year later, when he was summoned to the House of Lords through a writ of acceleration in his father's barony of Townshend. As his father was already Lord Townshend, Charles was styled Lord Lynn after the barony's territorial designation of Lynn Regis. Townshend then became Lord of the bedchamber in 1723 until 1727. In 1730 he was appointed Master of the Jewel Office to 1738. Also in 1730 he was appointed Lord Lieutenant of Norfolk and Custos Rotulorum of Norfolk. He succeeded to his father's titles and estates in 1738.

His Lordship erected and endowed at Raynham a charity school for clothing and educating thirty boys and twenty girls; the latter to be brought up in spinning. [4]

== Family ==
On 29 May 1723, Townshend married Audrey (Etheldreda) Harrison, the only daughter and heiress of Edward Harrison of Balls Park, Hertfordshire). They separated formally around 1740. Townsend died on 12 March 1764. His surviving children were George, later Marquess Townshend (1724–1807), Charles (1725–1767), and Audrey (died 1781) married to Robert Orme (soldier).

Arms of Townshend: Azure, a chevron ermine between three escallops argent

Political offices
Preceded by Thomas Rowley	Master of the Jewel Office; 1730 – 1736	Succeeded by Henry Heny
Parliament of Great Britain
Preceded by George England; Horatio Townshend	Member of Parliament for Great Yarmouth; 1722 – 1723; With: Horatio Walpole	Succeeded by Horatio Walpole; William Townshend
Honorary titles
Preceded by The Viscount Townshend	Lord Lieutenant of Norfolk; 1730 – 1738	Succeeded by The Earl of Buckinghamshire
Peerage of England
Preceded by Charles Townshend	Viscount Townshend; 1738 – 1764	Succeeded by George Townshend
Preceded by Charles Townshend	Baron Townshend (writ in acceleration); 1723 – 1764	Succeeded by George Townshend
