= Thomas Fanshawe (of Jenkins) =

Thomas Fanshawe (1607–1651) was an English politician who sat in the House of Commons from 1640 to 1642.

== Life ==
Fanshawe was the son of Sir Thomas Fanshawe of Jenkins, Barking, Essex. He was admitted at the Inner Temple in 1620 and matriculated from Trinity College, Cambridge in 1622, being awarded MA in 1624. He was called to the bar in 1630 and became a bencher.

In November 1640, Fanshawe was elected MP for Lancaster in the Long Parliament. He was disabled from sitting in September 1642.

== Family ==
Fanshawe married Susan, daughter of Matthias Otten of Putney. They had a son, Thomas, Member of Parliament for Essex, and a daughter Alice who married John Fanshawe of Parsloes.

Parliament of England
Preceded by Roger Kirkby; John Harrison	Member of Parliament for Lancaster; 1640; With: John Harrison	Succeeded by John Harrison
