= Thomas Fanshawe (1628–1705) =

English politician

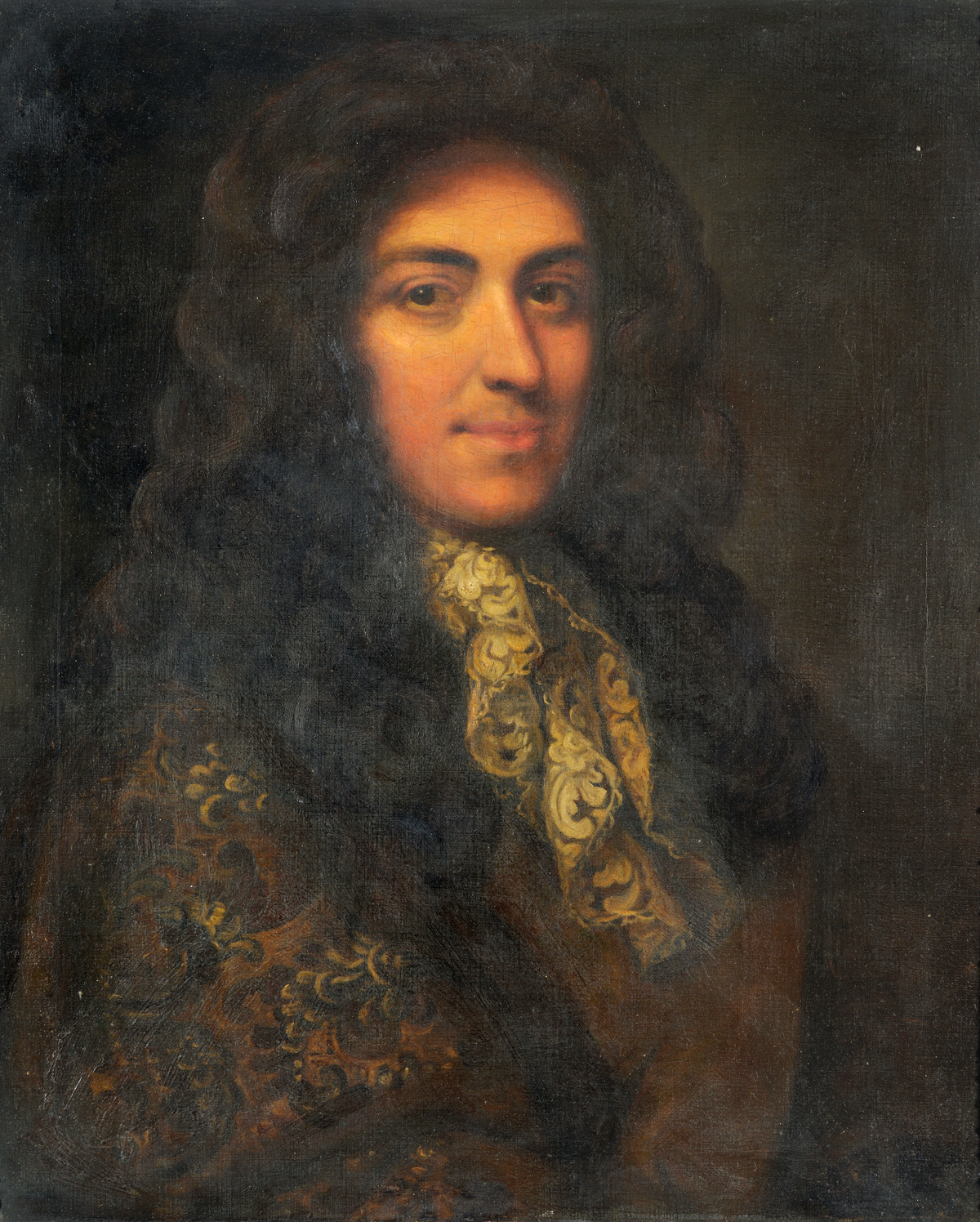
Thomas Fanshawe

Sir Thomas Fanshawe (1628–1705) was an English politician.

== Life ==
He was the son of Thomas Fanshawe of Jenkins and his wife, Susan, daughter of Matthias Otten of Putney. In the West of England as a royalist of the First English Civil War with his father, in 1645–6, and arrested in 1659, Fanshawe was knighted in 1660 after the English Restoration. He held the post of Clerk of the Crown in the King's Bench, as his father had done. He became Member of Parliament for Essex in 1685.

== Family ==
Fanshawe married first Margaret, daughter of Sir Edward Heath of Cottesmore, who died in 1674; and secondly Elizabeth, daughter of Thomas Fanshawe, 1st Viscount Fanshawe. Susannah, who married Baptist Noel and was mother of Baptist Noel, 3rd Earl of Gainsborough, was a daughter of the first marriage. On her death in 1714, the house at Jenkins passed to her daughter of the same name, who sold it in 1717 to Sir William Humfreys, 1st Baronet. It was replaced by one in the Queen Anne style.

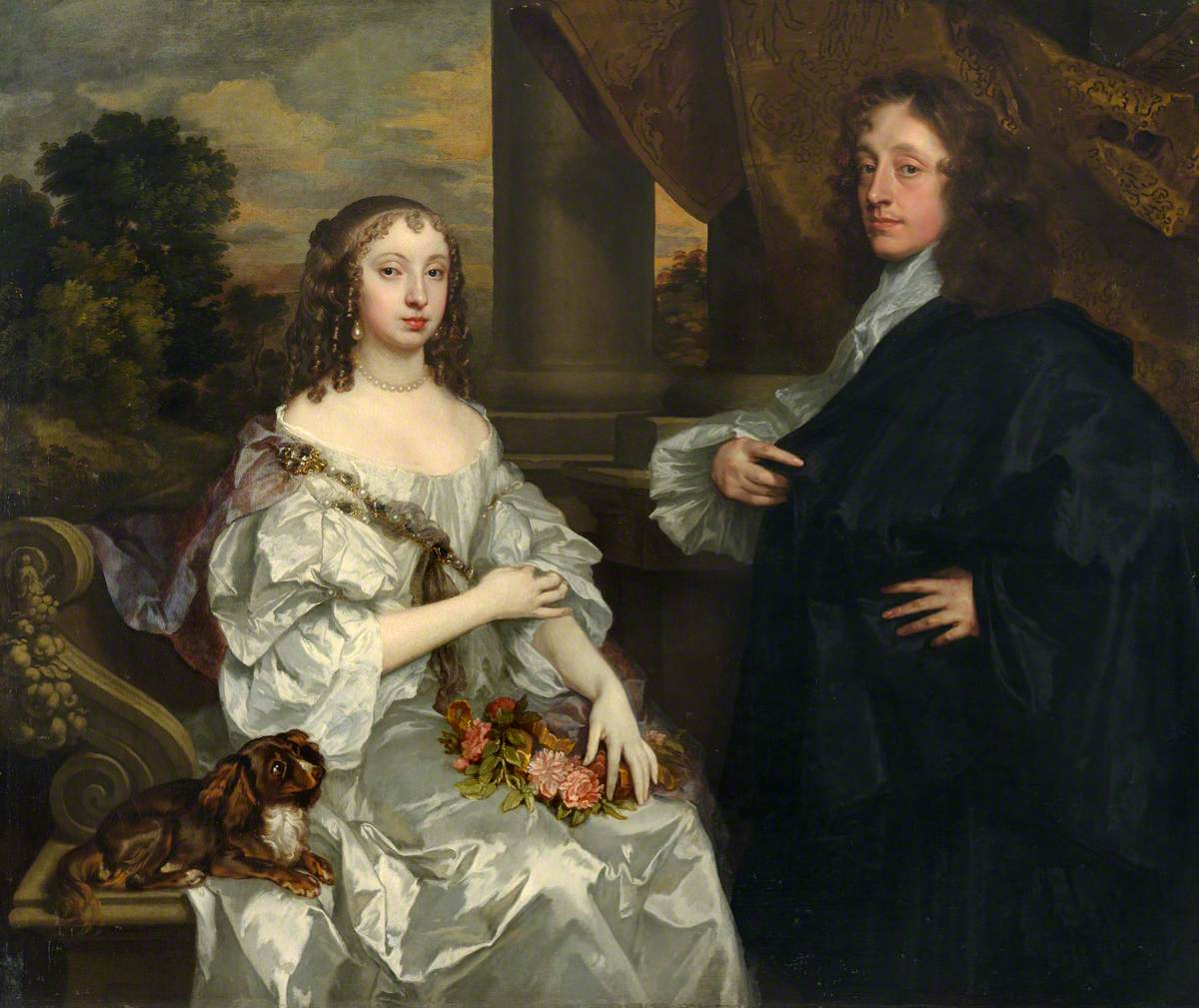
Sir Thomas Fanshawe of Jenkins and his first wife Margaret, double portrait from 1659 by Peter Lely
