= Margaret Cecil, Lady Brown =

Margaret Cecil, Lady Brown (1698 - 13 February 1782) was an English gentlewoman and sponsor of concerts who is best remembered for her enmity to the composer George Frideric Handel. The subject of their antagonism was taken up in poems of the period.

Margaret Cecil was born in 1698 to Robert Cecil and Elizabeth Meynell. Her father, who was ‘commonly called fat Cecil’, served as a member of parliament. Her mother was the heir of Meynell Langley. Her brother Charles Cecil was the Bishop of Bangor.
