= Edward Harrison (British administrator) =

British colonial administrator and politician

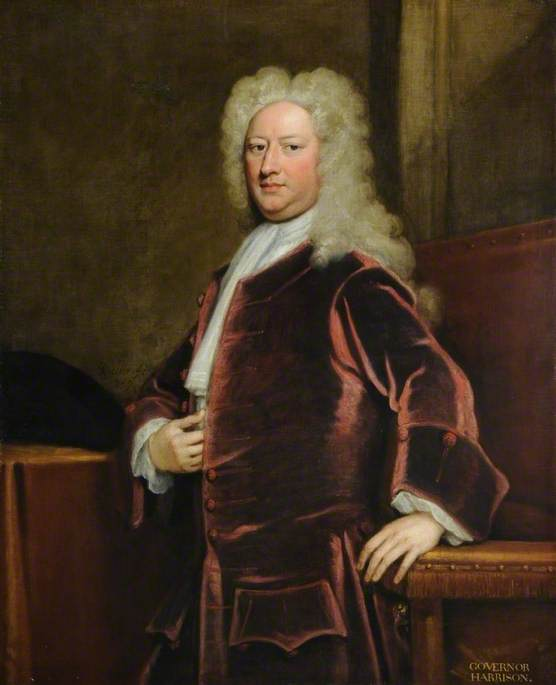
- Portrait by Godfrey Kneller

President of Fort St George (Madras)
- In office 11 July 1711 – 8 January 1717
- Preceded by: William Fraser (acting)
- Succeeded by: Joseph Collett
- Born: 3 December 1674
- Died: 28 November 1732 (aged 57)
- Spouse: Frances Bray (1674–1752)
- Children: Audrey Ethelreda Harrison
- Father: Richard Harrison
- Relatives: George Villiers (maternal grandfather)

Signature
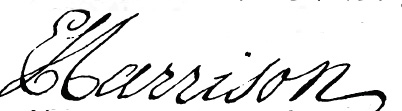

Edward Harrison (3 December 1674 – 28 November 1732) was a British colonial administrator and politician who sat in the House of Commons of Great Britain from 1717 to 1726. He served as the President of Madras from 11 July 1711 to 8 January 1717.

== Early life ==
Edward Harrison was born in England to Richard Harrison and Audrey Villiers daughter of George Villiers, 4th Viscount Grandison. He went to India as a purser, and became a captain of ships trading with China. He was Captain of the East Indiaman Gosfright in 1701, and of the Kent in 1709. Sometime before 1708 he married Frances Bray, daughter of Reginald Bray of Great Barrington, Gloucestershire. Her brothers Edmund and William Bray were Members of Parliament.

== Tenure as President of Madras ==
Harrison was appointed Governor and Commander in Chief of the Madras Presidency in 1711. During his time in office he undertook a major rebuilding of the settlement. He dealt with several incidents, including the putting down of a minor revolt. The East India Company presented him with a sword of honour.

=== War with Gingee ===
Since its occupation by the Mughals in 1698, Gingee had been ruled by Swaroop Singh, who was actually the Rajput Governor of the Mughal province who had declared his independence and assumed the title of Raja. The English at Fort St David frequently failed to pay their rents to the Raja. On one such occasion when Swaroops Singh did not receive any rent for the villages, he responded by capturing two English officers from Fort St David and imprisoning them. Matters came to standstill in February 1711, when open hostilities broke out between the kingdom of Gingee and the British settlement at Fort St David. Three Muslim officers in the service of Gingee and one officer of the British East India Company were killed in the ensuing hostilities. Harrison sent Richard Raworth, a member of the Council of Fort St George along with three ships to the scene of action to settle the matter.

Raworth arrived in Fort St David with three ships as Fort St David was blockaded by Swaroop Singh from land. Raworth's troops ran into a contingent of 400 cavalry and 1,000-foot commanded by Mahobat Khan on 11 August 1711 and barely managed to hold their ground. However, two top officers in the army, Captain Coventry and Ensign Somerville both lost their lives along with around 140 to 150 men of the Company's army. With matters reaching a standstill, Edward Harrison tried to enthuse the Nawab of Carnatic to come to the Company's aid but failed miserably. In the meantime, Richard Raworth was made the deputy Governor at Fort St David. Immediately on assumption of office, Raworth negotiated terms of peace with the Raja of Gingee. The Raja demanded a war indemnity of 16,000 pagodas in return for which he promised to cede three villages whose names have been mentioned as Trevandrun, Padre Copang and Coronuttum. However, even as the matter was under consideration, hostilities broke out once more when the Company troops attacked the forces of Gingee at Crimambakkam on 25 January 1712.

The war was, however, brought to a conclusion in April 1712 through the mediation of M.Hebert, the French Governor of Pondicherry. Swaroop Singh agreed to a settlement on payment of a war indemnity of 12,000 pagodas.

On 15 November 1714, Gingee fell to the forces of the Carnatic bringing Rajput rule to an end.

=== Postal service ===
It was during Edward Harrison's time that a postal service was established between the factories at Madras and Calcutta. This was the first postal system established by the British East India Company in India. Mail was carried by runners or Tappy peons who travelled all the way to Ganjam where they exchanged mails with runners from Calcutta.

=== Armenian Church ===
The Armenian church was constructed in Armenian Street in 1712 to cater to the religious needs of the powerful Armenian community of Madras.

=== Richard Raworth's Rebellion ===
In October 1713, Richard Raworth, Deputy Governor of Fort St David broke into rebellion and shook off his allegiance to Fort St George. Harrison immediately deputed a small force commanded by Henry Davenport to invade Fort St David and remove Raworth. Henry Davenport was commissioned as the provisional Deputy Governor of Fort St David on 10 October 1713.

The force reached Fort St David on 18 October 1713 after passing through Mangadu, Pondicherry and Cuddalore. Condapah Choultry was taken and a strong ultimatum was issued to Raworth. Besieged and starved for the want of provisions, Raworth finally agreed to a settlement on 10 December 1713 and with the mediation of the French of Pondicherry, Raworth was finally pardoned and allowed to seek asylum in France.

=== Caste disturbances in Madras ===
In late 1716, caste disturbances broke out in Madras city which affected life and commerce in the city to a great extent. These disturbances started when a man belonging to the Komati caste which is regarded as a right-hand caste reportedly worshipped the idol of a God worshipped by the Chetties who formed a left-handed caste. The problem was solved in a few days; but tensions persisted and hostilities resumed at the slightest excuse. The continuous caste-wars forced the painters of Triplicane to leave the area. With the dispute remaining unresolved and continuing to threaten the functioning of Madras city, Harrison's was recalled and replaced with Joseph Collett.

== Later life ==
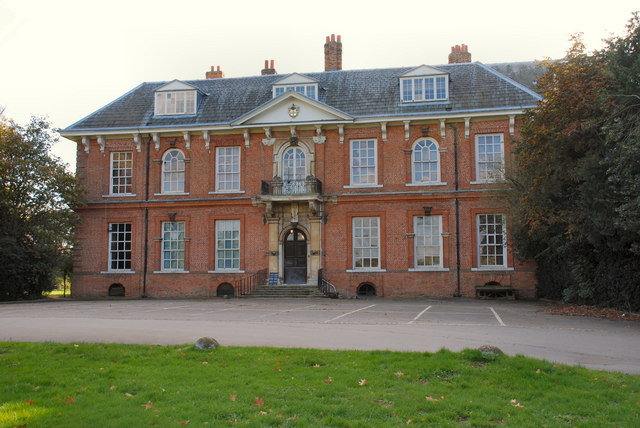
Balls Park

On his return to England, Harrison was returned as Member of Parliament for Weymouth and Melcombe Regis at a by-election on 2 March 1717. He became a Director of the East India Company in 1718 and remained until 1731. At the 1722 general election, he switched seats to his home area of Hertford and was elected top of the poll for Hertford. He was deputy chairman of the East India Company in 1723. In 1726, his father died and he inherited Balls Park. He vacated his seat at Hertford in favour of his brother George on 10 August 1726, when he was appointed Postmaster-General. He was deputy chairman of the EIC in 1728, chairman in 1729 and deputy again in 1731.

Harrison died on 28 November 1732. Through his marriage with Frances Bray, he had one son and three daughters, one of whom, Audrey "Etheldreda" Harrison, married Charles Townshend, 3rd Viscount Townshend in 1723.

== See also ==
- Governors of Madras

== Notes ==
Preceded by William Fraser (acting)	President of Madras; 11 July 1711 – 8 January 1717	Succeeded by Joseph Collett
Parliament of Great Britain
Preceded by John Baker; Thomas Littleton; Daniel Harvey; William Betts	Member of Parliament for Weymouth and Melcombe Regis; 1717–1722; With: Thomas Littleton; Daniel Harvey; William Betts	Succeeded by Sir James Thornhill; Thomas Pearse; John Ward; William Betts
Preceded by Sir Thomas Clarke; John Boteler	Member of Parliament for Hertford; 1722–1726; With: Charles Caesar 1722–1723; Sir Thomas Clarke 1723–1726	Succeeded by George Harrison; Sir Thomas Clarke
