= George Villiers, 4th Viscount Grandison =

Anglo-Irish peer (1618–1699)

The Viscount Grandison
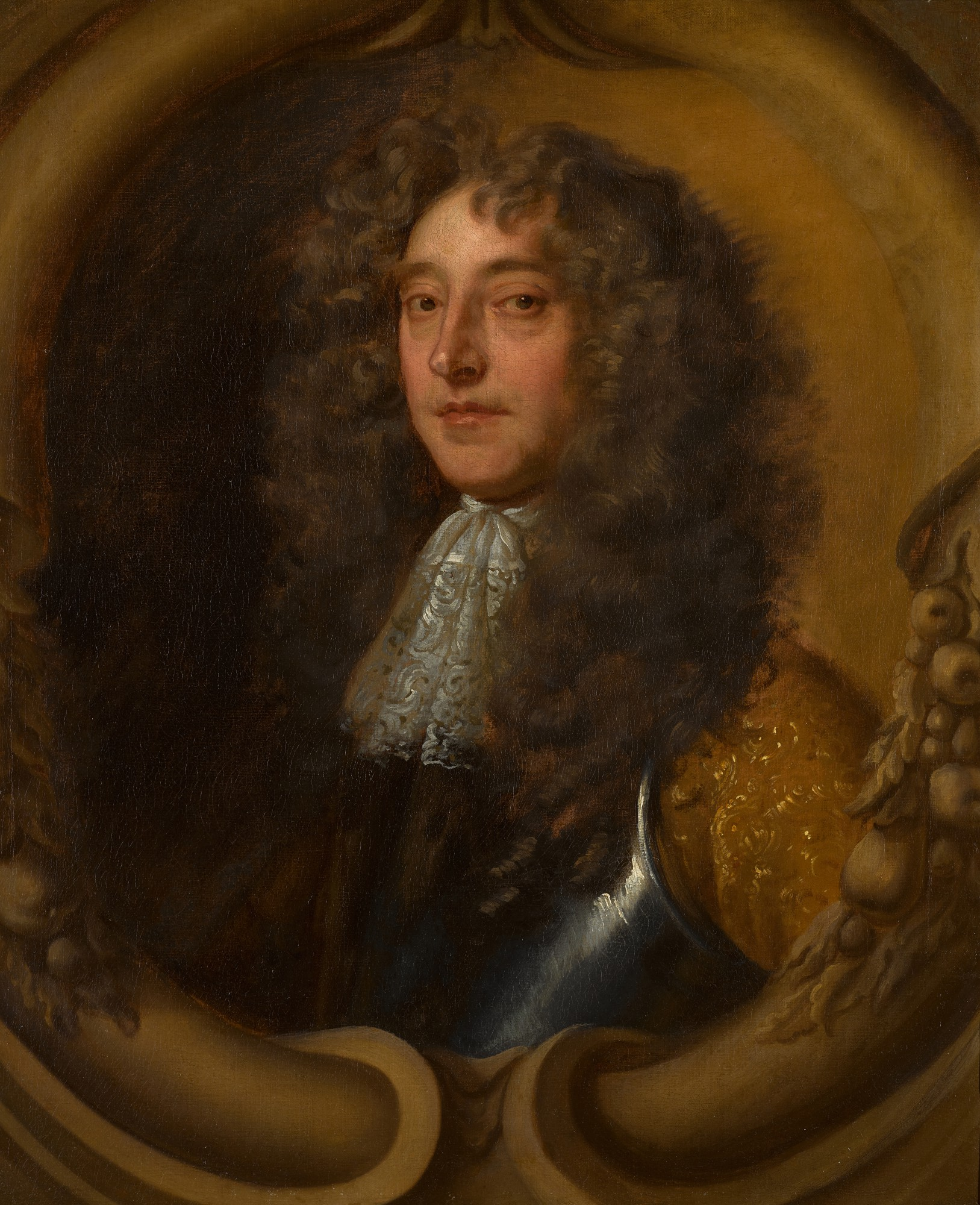
- Villiers by Peter Lely

Captain of the Yeomen of the Guard
- In office 1662–1689
- Monarchs: Charles II; James II; William III
- Preceded by: The Earl of Norwich
- Succeeded by: Viscount Mandeville

Personal details
- Born: George Villiers; 21 July 1618
- Died: 16 December 1699 (aged 81)
- Spouse: Mary Leigh
- Children: Audrey Harrison, Edward FitzGerald-Villiers, Mary Byde
- Parent(s): Edward Villiers, Barbara St. John

George Villiers, 4th Viscount Grandison (21 July 1618 – 16 December 1699), was an Anglo-Irish peer from the Villiers family. He is known for being the maternal great-grandfather of Pitt the elder, prime minister of Great Britain from 1766 to 1768. He was also the uncle of two royal mistresses, Barbara Villiers (mistress of Charles II of England), and Elizabeth Hamilton, Countess of Orkney (presumed mistress of William III of England).

He inherited the title Viscount Grandison upon the death of John Villiers, 3rd Viscount Grandison. His son, Edward FitzGerald-Villiers, died in 1693, so the title went to his grandson, John Villiers, 1st Earl Grandison. He married Lady Mary Leigh, the daughter of Francis Leigh, 1st Earl of Chichester. His second wife was Mary Garford, daughter of Richard Garford.

Villiers was knighted in 1644, most likely because he supported the royalist cause. In 1662, he was appointed Captain of the Yeomen of the Guard, and remained in that position until 1689, when he was removed from it by King William III. As captain, he was one of the most senior figures in the Royal household, which resulted in him walking immediately behind James II of England during the latter's coronation procession in 1685.
