= Balls Park =

House in Hertfordshire, England

Coordinates: 51°47′27.27″N 0°04′09.46″W

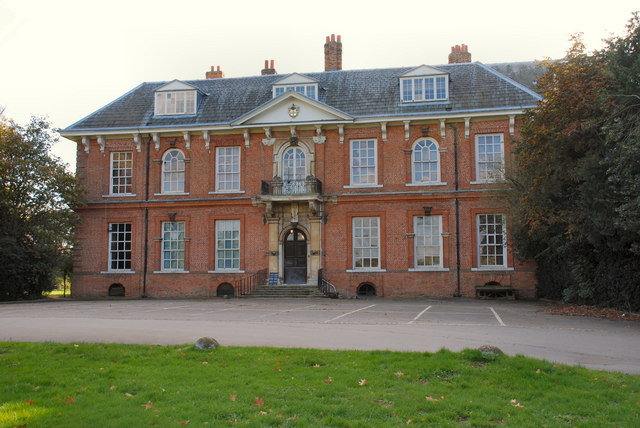
Balls Park

Balls Park in Hertford is a Grade I Listed mid-17th-century house. The estate and house are set in over 63 acres of parkland which is listed Grade II on the English Heritage Register of Parks and Gardens of Special Historic Interest. The estate and house has been claimed to have been the inspiration for Netherfield in Jane Austen's novel Pride and Prejudice, which is set in Hertfordshire.

== History of the site ==
Balls Park takes its name from its owner, Simon de Ball, a burgess of Hertford in 1297. By the reign of Elizabeth I, it was owned by William Henmarsh, whose only child, Jane, married Richard Willis, a Cambridgeshire landowner and barrister; their children included Thomas and Richard, each created a baronet for service to King Charles I. Thomas, the eldest son and heir, sold Balls Park to Sir John Harrison, a wealthy financier, and customs official, who constructed the present house between 1637 and 1640, possibly to the designs of Nicholas Stone, the king's master-mason.

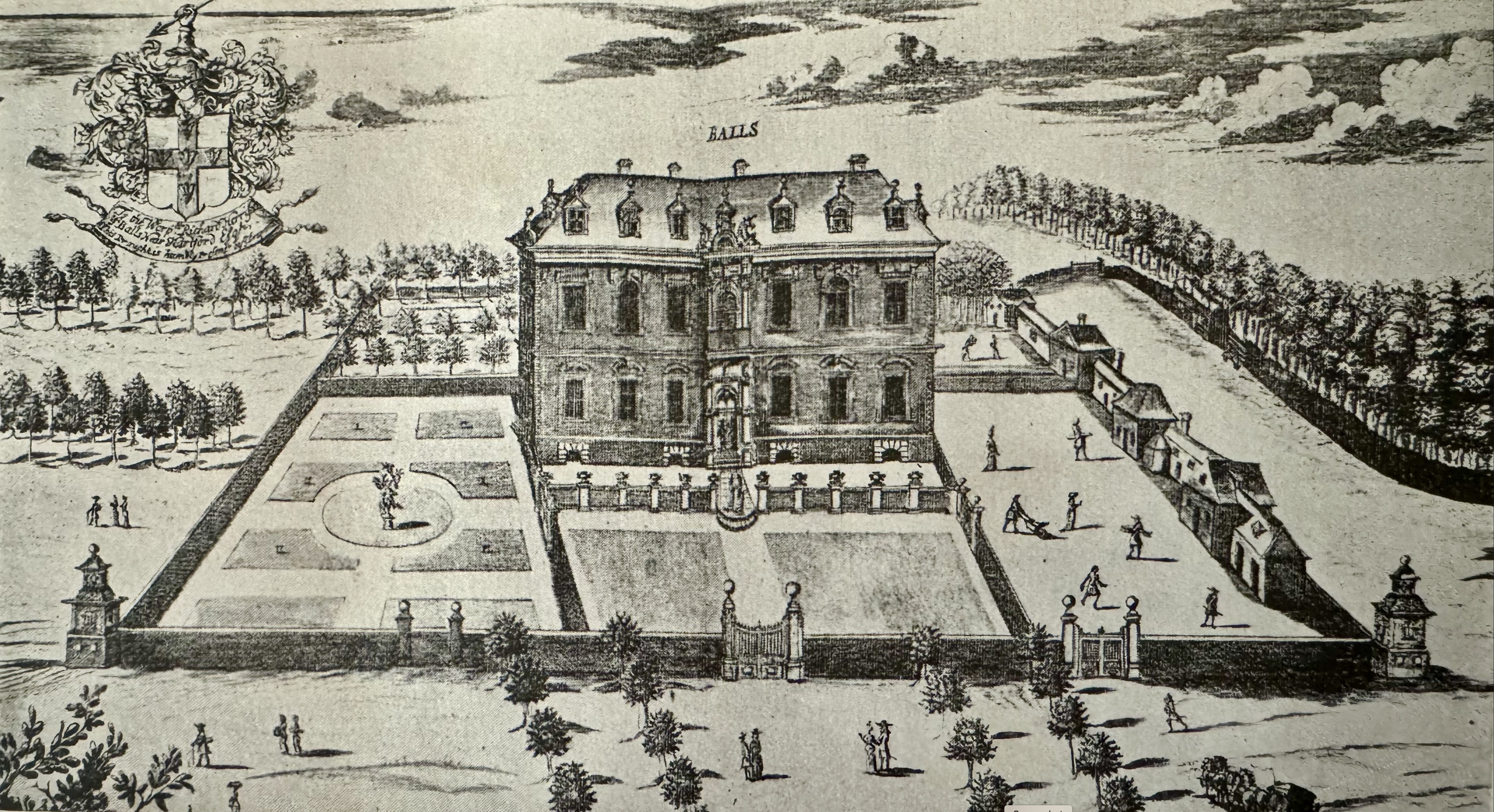
Balls Park, Hertfordshire, England circa late 17th century when it was first rebuilt by Richard Harrison.

The building is designed in the so-called Artisan Mannerist style, similar to several other Hertfordshire houses of the same date but shows purer classical traits which suggest metropolitan influences. Several later phases of remodelling can be traced stylistically to changes initiated by Harrison's son Richard Harrison and his grandson Edward Harrison, who had served in the colonial government of the East India Company. In 1759 the house was left by George Harrison to his niece Etheldreda Townshend whose husband, Charles, was estranged. She became a society hostess of some note.

In this way, the house passed to the family of the marquesses Townshend of Raynham in Norfolk, and so became a secondary home, though favoured by Lord John Townshend, who initiated further changes, possibly roofing over the courtyard as a saloon or atrium in the early 19th century.

In the 1880s, it was let to the Faudel-Phillips family, who purchased it outright in 1901 and made further changes. The estate offices and surviving stable block were built in 1902. In the early 1920s Sir Benjamin Faudel-Phillips commissioned the Scottish architect Sir Robert Lorimer to enlarge the house, by removing a series of service buildings and constructing a new west wing, mirroring the form of the mansion. The coach house was also remodelled at the same time.

In May 1940, Sir Winston Churchill famously said of the nation's art treasures: "Hide them in caves and cellars, but not one picture shall leave this island." By the time war was declared on 3 September 1939, the majority of the Wallace Collection had been carefully packed for transport and was already safely out of London, away from the risk of damage or destruction from German air raids. It would remain so for the duration of the war. The collection's new homes were a closely guarded secrets, with a large portion of the works from the collection being initially stored at Balls Park. When the property's then owner, Sir Lionel Faudel-Phillips, died in 1940 the house was put up for sale. This made it necessary for the Wallace's artworks to be moved to West Wycombe Park.

The estate was sold in 1946 and converted into a teacher training college, and served in an educational capacity for over 50 years, before closure in its final educational incarnation as the Hertford campus of the University of Hertfordshire in 2002.

City & Country acquired Balls Park in 2001 from the University of Hertfordshire. In 2003, planning permission was granted for a comprehensive redevelopment of this highly sensitive site according to English Heritage Enabling Development Guidelines that allowed the minimum new build possible to ensure the repair of the listed buildings and park. The scheme included commercial use for the listed buildings, the demolition of unsightly 1960s college buildings and the development of 132 new homes that were designed to respect the setting and context of the listed buildings and the historic park.

Several years later it was concluded by English Heritage that ‘the optimum viable use’ for this important Carolean country house was into residential apartments. Planning permission was granted in 2010 and The Mansion, Coach House and Stables have been restored and converted into 40 apartments by City & Country.

== Balls Park cricket ==
Balls Park is a cricket ground in the grounds of the Balls Park estate. The first recorded match on the ground was in 1865 between Hertford and a United South of England Eleven. In 1901, the ground hosted its first Minor Counties Championship match which was between Hertfordshire and Cambridgeshire. From 1901 to present, the ground has hosted 70 Minor Counties Championship matches and 2 MCCA Knockout Trophy matches.

The ground has played host to two List-A matches, the first of which was in the 1999 NatWest Trophy between Hertfordshire and the Sussex Cricket Board. The second was between Hertfordshire and Worcestershire.

In local domestic cricket, Balls Park is the home ground of Hertford Cricket Club who play in the Hertfordshire Cricket League Premier Division.
