= Ralph Milbanke =

Ralph Milbanke may refer to:

- Sir Ralph Milbanke, 4th Baronet (died 1748), of the Milbanke baronets
- Sir Ralph Milbanke, 5th Baronet (1725–1798)
- Ralph Noel (born Ralph Milbanke, died 1825), MP for County Durham
- Sir Ralph Mark Milbanke, 12th Baronet (1907–1949), of the Milbanke baronets
