= John Kincaid =

John Kincaid may refer to:

- John Kincaid (politician), United States Representative from Kentucky
- John Kincaid (political scientist), American political scientist
- Sir John Kincaid (British Army officer)

== See also ==
- John Kincade, American sports talk show host
