= North York Rifle Militia =

Auxiliary unit of the British Army

North York Rifle Militia 4th Battalion, Green Howards
- Active: 1558–1908
- Country: England (1558–1707); Kingdom of Great Britain (1707–1800); United Kingdom (1801–1908)
- Branch: Militia
- Role: Infantry
- Size: 1–4 Regiments
- Part of: Green Howards
- Garrison/HQ: Richmond Castle
- Nickname: 'Hexham Butchers'
- Engagements: Great Siege of Scarborough Castle; Siege of Bolton Castle; Hexham riot Second Boer War

Commanders
- Notable commanders: Sir William Pennyman, 1st Baronet; Henry Belasyse, 2nd Earl Fauconberg; Thomas Dundas, 1st Baron Dundas

The North York Militia, later the North York Rifles, was an auxiliary military force raised in the North Riding of Yorkshire in Northern England. From their formal organisation as Trained Bands in 1558 the Militia regiments of the riding served in home defence and internal security in all of Britain's major wars. It was one of the first British units to include specialist riflemen. The regiment became a battalion of the Green Howards in 1881, and saw service in the Second Boer War. It was disbanded in 1908.

== Early history ==
The English militia was descended from the Anglo-Saxon Fyrd, the military force raised from the freemen of the shires under command of their Sheriff. The universal obligation to serve continued under the Normans and the shire levies under the Sheriff of Yorkshire, Walter Espec, formed a large part of the army that defeated the invading Scots at the Battle of the Standard near Northallerton in 1138. The levies were reorganised under the Assizes of Arms of 1181 and 1252, and again by the Statute of Winchester of 1285. Now Commissioners of Array would levy the required number of men from each shire. The usual shire contingent was 1000 infantry commanded by a millenar, divided into companies of 100 commanded by constables or ductores, and subdivided into sections of 20 led by vintenars. The able-bodied men were equipped by their parishes and arrayed by the Wapentakes into which Yorkshire was divided.

Yorkshire was rarely called upon to supply men for the Plantagenet kings' campaigns in Wales, but its men were regularly summoned for expeditions to Scotland. For instance, Yorkshire levies were in the army at Berwick upon Tweed early in 1298, but a fresh levy later in the year apparently arrived too late for the Battle of Falkirk. For King Edward I's army of 1300 the ridings of Yorkshire were ordered to supply 5000 men, but they were over 2000 short and very irregularly arrayed, some 2900 gathering at Carlisle and then taking part in the short Siege of Caerlaverock.

The shire levies of Yorkshire would have been among those called out to defend against the Scottish Great Raid of 1322 and again in the Weardale campaign of 1327, where the threat was so great that all men between 16 and 60 were called out in parts of Yorkshire. Levies from Yorkshire were summoned in October 1332 for defensive duties during the campaign by the Disinherited Scots, and again the following year for King Edward III's Siege of Berwick and subsequent Battle of Halidon Hill. For the Roxburgh Campaign in the winter of 1334–35 the three ridings of Yorkshire were ordered to send 1050 light horsemen and 5310 foot, but only a fraction of these arrived. Those of the North Riding were the last to join, but they were supplemented by a contingent from the Honour of Richmond. (Note: The Honour of Richmond or Richmondshire was a feudal barony within the North Riding, comprising the wapentakes of Gilling East and West, Hang East, Hang West and Hallikeld.) For the summer campaign of 1335 the North Riding contingent comprised 3 ductores, 15 vintenars, 54 mounted archers and 247 foot archers, serving from 25 June to 27 August. Early in the reign of King Richard II the Scots were again harrying Northern England, and the men of the North Riding were arrayed three times between 1377 and 1380.

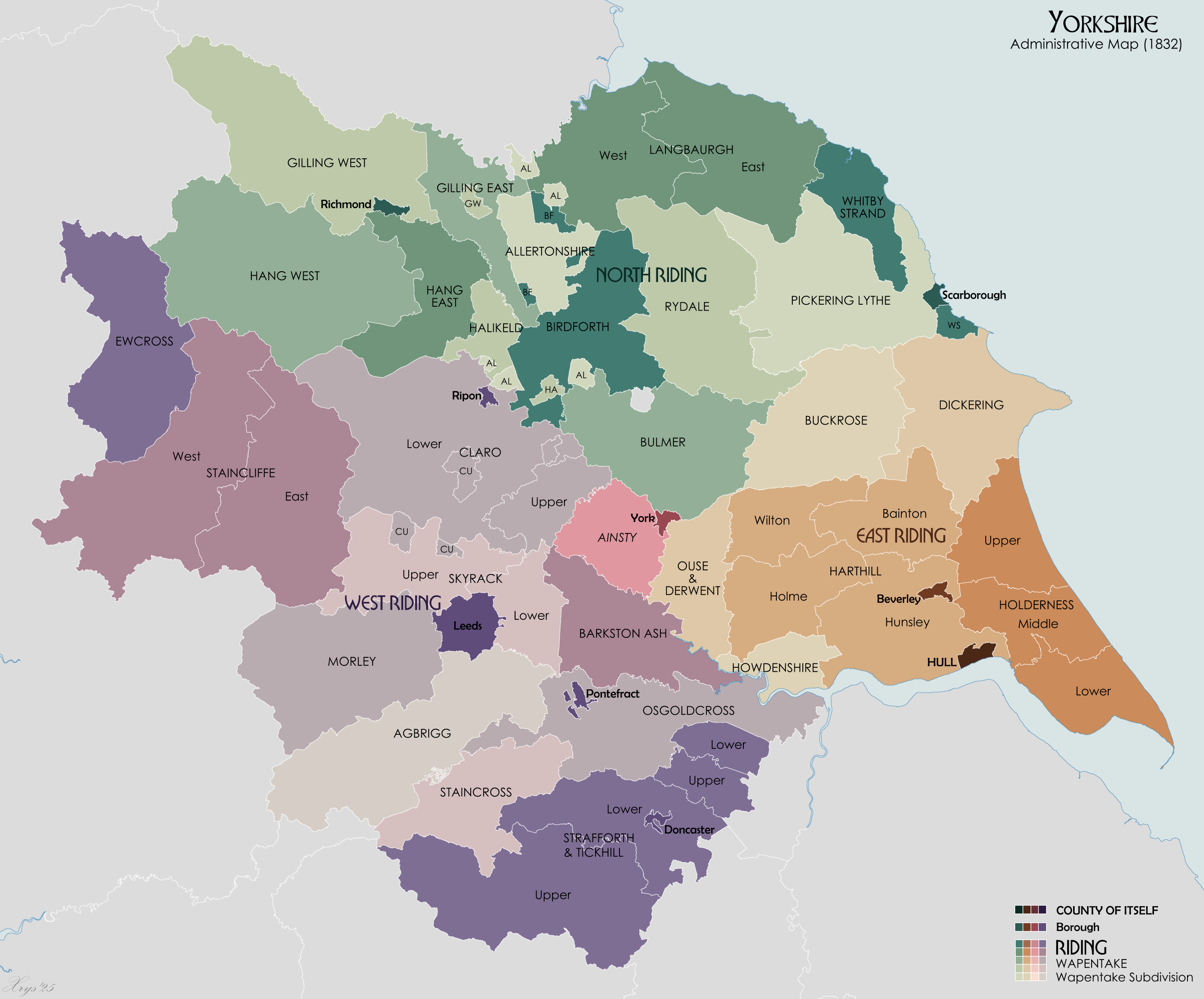
Wapentakes of Yorkshire: the North Riding is shown in shades of green.

King Henry VIII enforced the statutes, and in 1535 the commissioners took a muster of the men of the wapentakes of Birdforth and Allertonshire on Bagby Moor, near Thirsk, recording the names of the men from each township and the 'harness' each man possessed, such as 'jacks' (padded coats), Sallet helmets and 'splents' (arm guards). Threatened by a French invasion in 1539, Henry held a muster of the whole country, with the following results in the North Riding:

- At York, from the wapentakes of Hang East and Hallikeld: 613 men
- At West Tanfield in the wapentake of Hallikeld: 322 men
- At Richmond: 357 archers horsed and harnessed, 295 billmen ditto, 8 spearmen ditto; 242 archers neither horsed nor harness, 478 billmen ditto; total 1380 men
- On Bagby Moor, from the wapentake of Birdforth and the liberties of Byland and Newburgh: 248 archers, 140 billmen, 412 able men (archers and billmen) without harness
- On Middleham Moor: 455 archers horsed and harnessed, 326 billmen; 286 archers without horse or harness, 377 billmen, 7 spearmen; total 1451
- At Pickering: 180 archers horsed and harnessed, 111 billmen ditto; 360 archers not horsed or harnessed, 366 billmen ditto
- On Seamer Moor and at Guisborough: 389 archers horsed and harnessed, 313 billmen; 753 archers and billmen without horse or harness; total 1455.
- Within the Liberty of Allertonshire: 342 men
- Within the Liberties of Whitby and Whitby Strand: 1025 men
- At Barton Cross in Ryedale Wapentake: 267 men with horse and harness, 911 without

After Henry's death in 1547, the county and city of York were ordered to send 600 men to Alnwick in Northumberland. The North Riding supplied 227 of these, of whom 141 came from the wapentakes of Richmondshire. The deployment being outside their county, the men were issued with coat and conduct money to supply them with a uniform coat and to pay for their journey.

== North York Trained Bands ==
The legal basis of the militia was updated by two acts of 1557 covering musters (4 & 5 Ph. & M. c. 3) and the maintenance of horses and armour (4 & 5 Ph. & M. c. 2). The county militia was now under the Lord Lieutenant, assisted by the deputy lieutenants and justices of the peace (JPs). The entry into force of these acts in 1558 is seen as the starting date for the organised county militia in England. Although the militia obligation was universal, it was impractical to train and equip every able-bodied man, and from 1572 the practice was to select a proportion of men for the Trained bands, (TBs) who were mustered for regular training.

When war broke out with Spain training and equipping the militia became a priority. In 1584–85 the JPs of the North Riding were planning to equip and train 1000 men, 250 with corslets (armour, signifying pikemen), 400 with calivers (firearms), 200 archers and 150 billmen. The captains were to select four or more of the best shots in their companies as corporals, each to train 20–25 of the men in aimed fire at 150 yards (140 m) range. In 1586 the new Lord Lieutenant of Yorkshire, the Earl of Huntingdon, doubled the number of men due from the North Riding. The same proportions applied except that billmen were reduced in favour of pikemen, and Huntingdon ordered that the 'shot' should be concentrated in the wapentakes nearest the coast. Training should be held four times between 24 May and 22 July, the 'shot' being trained for three days on each occasion before the whole band was brought together, the powder and match to be supplied by the Lord Mayor of York and paid for by the wapentakes. In 1588 Captain Ralph Bosvile was appointed muster-master to oversee the training of the Yorkshire TBs. As the threat of invasion increased Huntingdon was ordered to raise 12,000 men in Yorkshire and County Durham, 3000 for coast defence, 6000 for the rest of the area, and 3000 as a mobile reserve. He reported that he had only 400 horse, but 6000 good foot and 2000 hardly inferior. When the Spanish Armada threatened to land the Duke of Parma's army on the coast of England, the captains, including Sir William Fairfax of the Bulmer and Ryedale companies (300 men) were alerted to have their bands in readiness. The threat disappeared with the defeat of the Armada at sea.

In the 16th Century little distinction was made between the militia and the troops levied by the counties for overseas expeditions. Between 1589 and 1601 Yorkshire supplied 1810 levies for service in Ireland, 400 for France and 400 for the Netherlands. However, the counties usually conscripted the unemployed and criminals rather than the Trained Bandsmen – in 1585 the Privy Council had ordered the impressment of able-bodied unemployed men, and the Queen ordered 'none of her trayned-bands to be pressed'. Replacing the weapons issued to the levies from the militia armouries was a heavy cost on the counties.

With the passing of the threat of invasion, the TBs declined in the early 17th Century. Later, King Charles I attempted to reform them into a national force or 'Perfect Militia' answering to the king rather than local control. In 1638 the Yorkshire TBs were the largest in the country, mustering 12,241 foot together with 365 Cuirassiers and 35 Dragoons.

=== Bishops' Wars ===
In November 1638, the King's relationship with Scotland moved towards outright hostilities (the First Bishops' War) and the counties were ordered to muster their TBs and keep them in readiness. As the King gathered an expeditionary force on the border in 1639, Yorkshire became an important staging-post, with the TBs ordered to rendezvous at York, though in practice many of the men sent were not trained bandsmen but untrained substitutes.

Four regiments were assembled from the North Riding:

- Richmondshire, Colonel Lord Darcy of Hornby Castle
- Langbaurgh, Col Sir William Pennyman, 1st Baronet of Marske Hall.
- Pickering Lythe, Col Sir Hugh Cholmeley, 1st Baronet, colonel since 1636
- Northallertonshire, Col Sir Robert Strickland of Sizergh Castle

On 1 April the King ordered Pennyman and his regiment to march to reinforce Berwick, which was threatened by the Scots. The rest of the force at York marched north piecemeal until it concentrated at Newcastle upon Tyne and then moved up to camp at Birkhill west of Berwick on 30 May. The force was poorly trained and supplied; when a superior force of Scots Covenanters was arrayed on nearby Duns Law Charles negotiated the Treaty of Berwick and the army dispersed.

When hostilities were renewed in 1640 (the Second Bishops' War) Charles's government attempted to form better regiments by combining TB contingents. The northern counties including Yorkshire were to provide the core of trained troops. It seems that in this campaign Pennyman's Langbaurgh regiment served to guard the crossings of the River Tees. Sir Hugh Cholmley had been dismissed from his county appointments in 1639, but his brother Lieutenant-Colonel Henry Cholmley commanded the Pickering Lythe regiment on its march north. But once again the trained men were outweighed by untrained, unpaid, unwilling substitutes, and there were widespread mutinies and disorders at York and elsewhere. Charles's generals were unwilling to commit this force to action on the border. The campaign was as much a failure as the previous year's.

=== Civil Wars ===
Control of the TBs was one of the main points of dispute between Charles I and Parliament that led to the First English Civil War. However, when open warfare broke out neither side made much use of the TBs beyond securing the county armouries for their own full-time troops who would serve anywhere in the country, many of whom were former trained bandsmen, or using the TBs as auxiliary units for garrisons.

For example, Sir William Pennyman raised a Royalist Regiment of Foot that was largely recruited from the Yorkshire TBs and led by men from Yorkshire and Durham, several of them previously Yorkshire TB officers. This was the senior foot regiment in the King's army and fought at Edgehill in 1642, later forming part of the army at Oxford.

The Cholmley brothers supported Parliament, Sir Henry raising a regiment of foot that fought at Edgehill and Sir Hugh commanding regiments of horse and foot in the garrison of Scarborough Castle. But in 1643 Sir Hugh changed sides and thereafter held Scarborough for the King. It is probable that men of the Pickering Lythe TB Regiment served in the garrison. After the Battle of Marston Moor in 1644 Scarborough was the last important Royalist garrison and seaport in Yorkshire. It was besieged from February until 25 July 1645, when Cholmley surrendered on terms.

Colonel John Scrope and members of the Darcy family, with a party of the Richmondshire TBs, held Bolton Castle, which was intermittently under siege from July 1643 until its surrender in November 1645.

Once Parliament had established full control it passed new Militia Acts in 1648 and 1650 that replaced lords lieutenant with county commissioners appointed by Parliament or the Council of State. At the same time the term 'Trained Band' began to disappear. Under the Commonwealth and Protectorate the militia received pay when called out, and operated alongside the New Model Army to control the country.

== Restoration Militia ==
After the Restoration of the Monarchy, the English Militia was re-established by the Militia Act 1661 (13 Cha. 2 St. 1. c. 6) under the control of the king's lords lieutenant, the men to be selected by ballot. This was popularly seen as the 'Constitutional Force' to counterbalance a 'Standing Army' tainted by association with the New Model Army that had supported Cromwell's military dictatorship, and almost the whole burden of home defence and internal security was entrusted to the militia.

The North York Militia regiments of foot were now commanded as follows:

- Richmondshire: Sir Henry Stapylton, 1st Baronet of Myton, later Col Hon Conyers Darcy
- Langbaurgh: Col Henry Chaytor
- Pickering Lythe: Sir Jordan Crosland
- Northallerton: Sir Thomas Strickland

The militia were frequently called out during the reign of King Charles II; for example, when a plot was discovered in the West Riding in 1663, the North Riding militia was mustered and 300 foot placed on alert to march at the slightest warning. The North Riding men were warned for duty in 1665 and again in July 1666 because of French and Dutch invasion threats. In 1666 it was announced that any additional volunteers who presented themselves would be issued with weapons from reserve stocks if there was an invasion. The Dutch did mount an attack in 1667, raiding the Medway and Suffolk coast. Viscount Fauconberg as Lord Lieutenant of the North Riding (a new position since the Restoration), had been ordered in June to call out all his horse and foot to defend the coast, and when news of the rids arrived he deployed three Troops of Militia Horse along the coast: Viscount Fauconberg's at Whitby, Sir George Savile's at Bridlington, and Sir Thomas Slingsby's at Scarborough. After six weeks' paid service the men were stood down in anticipation of the signing of the Treaty of Breda on 31 July. By the 1670s there were complaints that the North Riding militia had not met for two, three or four years at a time

Colonel Conyers Darcy of the Richmondshire Regiment was elevated to the House of Lords in 1680 and the following year passed the colonelcy to his son, John Darcy, who was simultaneously a Major in the Queen's Troop of Horse Guards. During the crisis of the Rye House Plot in 1683, Fauconberg's Troop was marched to the vicinity of London at Croydon and Uxbridge and was later at Putney and Wandsworth. Yorkshire was not directly involved in the Monmouth Rebellion of 1685, but after its defeat at the Battle of Sedgemoor the deputy lieutenants of the North Riding used individual militia companies to hunt for the 'principal actors' and 'suspicious persons'. Despite these exertions, two of the conspirators made their escape from Scarborough.

After the rebellion's defeat, King James II disregarded the militia and concentrated on expanding the Regular Army, upon which he felt he could rely, unlike the locally commanded militia. The Yorkshire Militia horse and foot had been regularly mustered from 1678 until the end of 1685, but not again except in single troops and companies, and the muster rolls were out of date. With a new invasion threatened, by William of Orange, Henry Cavendish, 2nd Duke of Newcastle was appointed Lord Lieutenant of all three Ridings of Yorkshire on 5 October 1688 and he immediately formed the eight independent troops of horse militia into a single regiment under his own command. Although the militia played almost no part in the overthrow of James II in the Glorious Revolution of 1688, one of the exceptions was the Yorkshire Militia. After William's landing in the West Country on 5 November, two of his leading supporters, the Earl of Danby and Viscount Lumley seized York. They were aided by Lt-Col Sir Henry Goodricke, 2nd Baronet of the West York Militia and Col John Darcy of the Richmondshire Militia (who had earlier been conveniently 'unable to find' Lumley when ordered to detain him). The conspirators seized the main guard and gates of the city, detained the Governor, Sir John Reresby, 2nd Baronet, disarmed and turned out the old soldiers of the garrison company and installed their militia in their place. The companies of the Richmondshire Regiment took turns to guard the magazine at Scarborough. The conspirators then arranged to continue paying the militia when their 14 or 21 days' service had expired. Afterwards a company of mounted grenadiers for service in William's Irish campaign was raised by Henry Belasyse with volunteers from the North York Militia (leading to a legend that the North York Militia had served there). Equipped with militia arms and horses, the company marched out of York on 16 December 1688.

Colonel Darcy died early in 1689 and Sir William Chaytor, 1st Baronet, became colonel of the Richmondshire Regiment. In 1689 and 1690 the militia were alerted in case of French invasion, but the situation remained quiet during the remainder of the Nine Years' War. A national muster of the militia was called in 1697. There were now eight foot regiments in Yorkshire, of which three (together with three troops of horse) were in the North Riding:

- Richmondshire Regiment: 323 men in 7 companies commanded by Col Sir Christopher Wandesford, 2nd Baronet
- Cleveland (Note: The Liberty of Cleveland consisted of Langbaurgh Wapentake.) Regiment: 303 men in 6 companies commanded by Col Sir Thomas Pennyman, 2nd Baronet
- Bulmer Regiment: 276 men in 5 companies formerly commanded by the late Col Sir Bartholomew Bouchier
- Bulmer Troop: 56 men commanded by Capt Sir William Robinson, 1st Baronet
- Cleveland Troop: 57 men commanded by Capt Sir William Hustler
- Richmondshire Troop: 62 men commanded by Capt John Hutton

The militia were rarely mustered thereafter. In response to the Jacobite Rising of 1715 the lieutenancies of the northern shires were ordered on 16 September to prepare their militia, which meant quickly finding new officers and men. The Lord Lieutenant of the North Riding, Robert Darcy, 3rd Earl of Holderness, commissioned Thomas Worsley as Lt-Col of the Cleveland Regiment of Militia Foot, and the parishes did their best to supply the men and equipment. Although there was a Jacobite rising in Northumberland in October, the rebels did not threaten Yorkshire, instead moving towards Lancashire where they were defeated by Regular forces at the Battle of Preston. The Yorkshire Militia seems to have played no part against the Jacobite rising of 1745 – though a volunteer regiments was raised and served without pay – and fell into abeyance like the rest of the militia in England.

== 1757 Reforms ==
Under threat of French invasion during the Seven Years' War a series of Militia Acts from 1757 re-established county militia regiments, the men being conscripted by means of parish ballots (paid substitutes were permitted) to serve for three years. There was a property qualification for officers, who were commissioned by the lord lieutenant. An adjutant and drill sergeants were to be provided to each regiment from the Regular Army, and arms and accoutrements would be supplied from the Tower of London when the county had secured 60 per cent of its quota of recruits. The North Riding was given a quota of 720 men to fill.

There was considerable opposition to the militia ballot and militia taxation, which broke out into rioting, with mobs attempting to destroy the magistrates' and parish constables' lists. Yorkshire was particularly affected, with a major riot in the Wapentake of Bulmer on 12 September 1757. The mob terrorised the magistrates and seized the lists, then moved on to York to prevent the meeting of the lieutenants, destroying the inn where they were to meet. Afterwards George Fox-Lane, the Lord Mayor of York formed a 500-strong body of armed citizens to mount guard. A lieutenancy meeting at Thirsk on 20 September was called off and the North Riding remained disturbed for some time, particularly around Whitby.

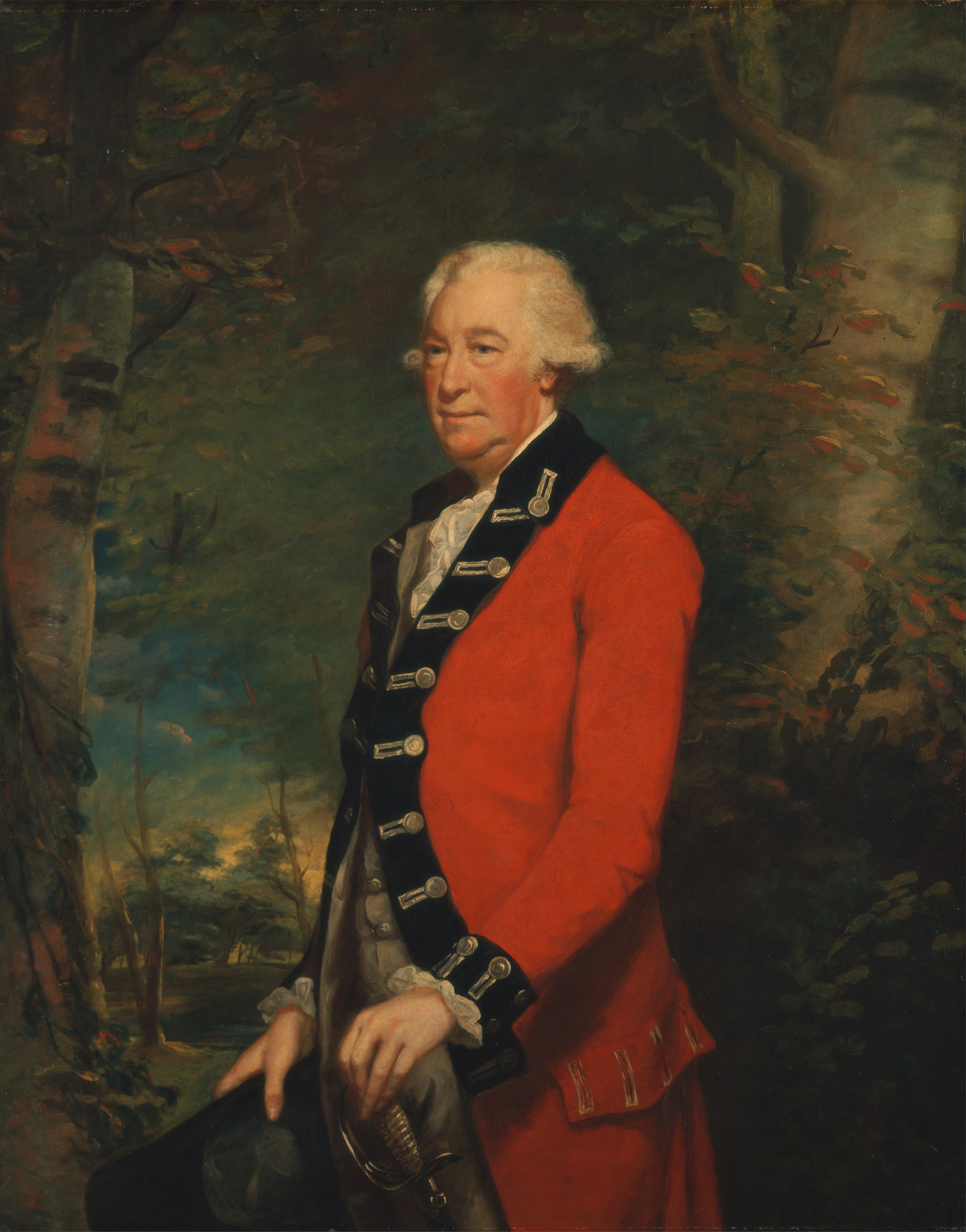
1784 portrait of Sir Ralph Milbanke as colonel of the North York Militia

The Lord Lieutenant of the North Riding, Robert Darcy, 4th Earl of Holderness, was in a difficult position: he had voted against the Acts, but as Secretary of State for the Northern Department he was obliged to order the lords-lieutenant in Northern England to enforce them. Accordingly, he began lieutenancy meetings in the North Riding on 5 August 1758 to put the Acts into force. His political friends in the riding readily offered to take commissions. By the following summer he had formed two battalions each of nine companies, the Richmondshire on 3 July 1759, which was immediately embodied, and the Cleveland and Bulmer Battalion followed later in the year (though it was sometimes referred to as the 1st Battalion). The commissions of the two commanding officers (COs), Col Sir Ralph Milbanke, 5th Baronet of the Richmondshire and Col Thomas Duncombe, MP, of the Cleveland & Bulmer, were dated January 1759. Duncombe was a political opponent and had come under suspicion in 1745, but Holderness's friends did not think that he could be refused a commission. Holderness had originally re-appointed his uncle Sir Conyers Darcy as colonel of the Richmondshire battalion, but although Darcy helped to organise the regiments he had first held the colonelcy 50 years before and he died in December 1758. Many of the men enlisted were substitutes for balloted men, the officers of the company raised in Ryedale collecting subscriptions from those liable to the ballot in order to pay the bounties promised to the volunteers.

The Richmondshire Battalion marched to Newcastle on 2 August, where it was later joined by the Cleveland & Bulmer. They remained in the North-East for several years, alternating quarters between Newcastle, Gateshead, Durham, Berwick and Sunderland. Rioting against the militia ballot broke out in various towns in Northumberland in February 1761. On 7 March Col Duncombe sent two companies from each battalion of the North York Militia under Maj Christopher Crowe to Hexham. Next day a crowd of several thousand gathered in the town. The magistrates read the Riot Act and instructed them to disperse, but they attacked the militia, breaking into their ranks. One of the ringleaders seized a private's musket and shot him dead, and an ensign was shot in the back by a pistol from the crowd. The militia were then ordered to open fire, which cleared the rioters, leaving 18 dead and six seriously wounded in the market place though it was believed that nearly 50 had died, some bodies being found in the fields. the Cleveland battalion had lost one private killed, the ensign who died of his wound, and three other privates wounded; the Richmond battalion had no casualties. The North York Militia were praised for their resolute action, but gained the nickname of the 'Hexham Butchers'. One of the wounded privates was granted an Out-Pension from the Royal Hospital Chelsea, one of the first awarded to a militiaman. (The militia contributed 5 per cent of their pay towards the cost of the hospital, the same as the Regulars).

The two battalions spent the summer of 1761 and 1762 in Yorkshire, being quartered at various times at Hull, Richmond, Masham, Gilling and Beverley. In September 1762 they were moved out of their billets in Richmond to accommodate the crowds for a race meeting. On 2 October the two battalions returned to Newcastle. By now the term of service of the early recruits was nearing expiry, and the lieutenancy considered ways to keep up numbers, including amalgamating the two battalions. However, peace was concluded with France on 3 November, and on 3 December the two battalions were marched back to North Yorkshire so the men could be discharged near to the parishes where they had been balloted. Thereafter the militia did 28 days' training each year.

=== American War of Independence ===
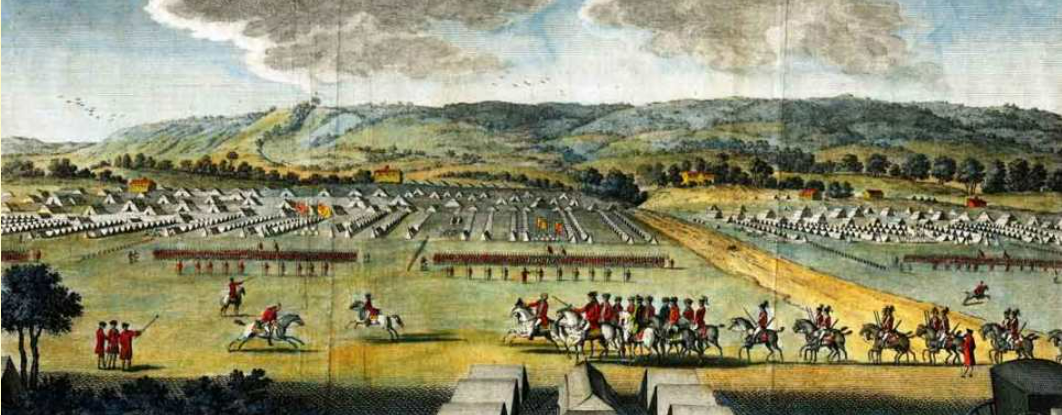
Coxheath Camp in 1778.

The American War of Independence broke out in 1775, and by 1778 Britain was threatened with invasion by the Americans' allies, France and Spain, while the bulk of the Regular Army was serving overseas. On 28 March the militia were ordered to be embodied on 21 April. This time the North York Militia was embodied as a single regiment of 10 companies (including a Grenadier Company) under the command of Sir Ralph Milbanke. On 1 May 1778 the regiment was sent to quarters at Leeds, with a strength of 642 rank and file against its establishment of 720. The great majority were substitutes rather than balloted men, and this continued through the regiment's early history. Lord Fauconberg wanted to add a light infantry company but was informed that there was no authority for this. On 6 June the regiment began a march to Newcastle. In November it moved to York for the winter.

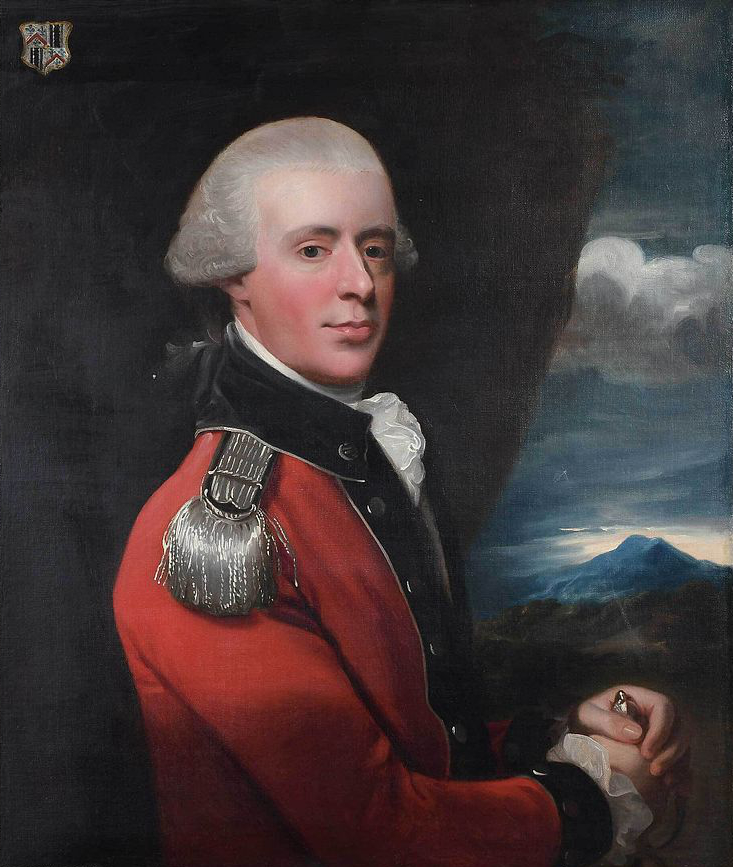
Henry Belasyse, 2nd Earl Fauconberg by John Singleton Copley, shown in the uniform of the North York Militia.

During the summer of 1779 the North Yorkshire Militia was at Coxheath Camp near Maidstone in Kent, which was the army's largest training camp, where the Militia were exercised as part of a division alongside Regular troops while providing a reserve in case of French invasion of South East England. Colonel Milbanke resigned in October and Henry Belasyse, 2nd Earl Fauconberg was commissioned to succeed him on 18 November 1779. The camp broke up in November and the regiment was distributed across villages in west Kent for winter quarters. On 25 May 1780 the regiment was sent to Gosport in Hampshire, due to arrive on 9 June. It was apparently one of the militia regiments ordered to London during the Gordon Riots, camping in Hyde Park and St James's Park. It then camped at Stokes Bay outside Gosport until the end of October, when it was distributed by companies in billets across Hertfordshire. From 1 June 1781 the regiment was at Danbury Camp in Essex. On 26 October it began a move back to Yorkshire, arriving at Pontefract on 14 November. Training included winter route marches on the moors round Kirkbymoorside. In June 1782 the regiment moved to Eighton Banks for the camping season and then in November went into winter quarters in nearby Sunderland. On 13 February 1783 it was called out to aid the civil powers in suppressing an anti-pressgang riot by Royal Navy sailors. The militia patrolled the streets for two days.

A few days later the war was ended by the agreement of a peace treaty at Paris, and the North York Militia was marched to Richmond, where it was disembodied on 12 March 1783. From 1784 to 1792 the militia were assembled for their 28 days' annual peacetime training, but to save money only two-thirds of the men were actually mustered each year.

=== French Revolutionary War ===
On 1 December the Lord Lieutenant of the North Riding, now Earl Fauconberg, was instructed to call out the trained part of the North York Militia. The regiment was embodied on 20 December 1792, even before Revolutionary France declared war on Britain on 1 February 1793. Fauconberg was still colonel of the regiment, but it was usually commanded by Lt-Col Sir Thomas Dundas, 2nd Baronet, appointed in 1789.

The French Revolutionary Wars saw a new phase for the English militia: they were embodied for a whole generation, and became regiments of full-time professional soldiers (though restricted to service in the British Isles), which the regular army increasingly saw as a prime source of recruits. They served in coast defences, manning garrisons, guarding prisoners of war, and for internal security, while their traditional local defence duties were taken over by the part-time Volunteers and mounted Yeomanry.

The regiment was ordered to march from Richmond to Newcastle and Gateshead, but the men were not paid their 'marching money'. The following morning, when the first 'division' (half-battalion) paraded at Darlington they refused to continue their march until it was paid. Lieutenant-Col Dundas promised that the money would be paid at Newcastle, and the men were further encouraged by news that an Act going through Parliament meant that wives and children of militiamen would be financially supported by the county. The ban on militia regiments recruiting by 'beat of drum' outside their own counties had also been lifted, and the North Yorkshires found that they could raise men easily in Newcastle.

On 20 February 1793, shortly after the regiment arrived in Newcastle, there was a strike among coal miners at Washington, Co Durham. Lieutenant–Col Dundas was in command of all the troops quartered in Newcastle, and he sent a detachment of the regular Inniskilling Dragoons to disperse the crowds, but the strike continued for three weeks and the garrison had troops out daily to watch for the movements of the strikers. In March a party of some 500 sailors at North Shields attempted to free some of their fellows who had been taken by a Royal Navy pressgang. Failing, they then marched on Newcastle, but Lord Fauconberg marched out at the head of a party of the North Yorkshire Militia and the sailors dispersed. In November the regiment was engaged in fire-fighting in Newcastle

During the summer of 1794 the regiment was temporarily sent out to quarters around Morpeth, Chester-le-Street, Blyth and Seaton while the Newcastle Assizes were in session. That year two 6-pounder 'battalion guns' were attached to each militia regiment, and the North Yorks sent parties to Tynemouth for instruction in gunnery, suffering some casualties in a training accident. In December 1794 the regiment was rapidly marched in two divisions to Berwick and Tweedmouth on their way to deal with a serious mutiny at Glasgow. The mutiny having been quelled, the regiment remained in billets at Berwick until February 1795 when it marched through snow to the Sunderland area to join a division of regular and auxiliary troops on coast defence duties under General Sir William Howe. The North York Militia was brigaded with the 37th Foot and the Royal Lancashire Fencibles at Whitley Bay under the command of Major-General Lord Mulgrave.

=== Green jackets ===
In response to the invasion threat the government had increased the available forces by forming fencible (home defence) regiments of horse and foot, and by encouraging the counties to add volunteer companies to their militia regiments, paid for by subscription. North Yorkshire set up a subscription fund, to which Col Earl Fauconberg and Lt-Col Sir Thomas Dundas were major contributors. On 24 July 1795 two companies (168 men) of 'light-armed marksmen' were ordered to be added to the North York Militia. Although some have claimed that these were the first green-jacketed rifle companies in British service they were actually armed with fusils (light muskets) rather than rifles, and their green uniform was not so dark as that of the 95th Rifles when that regiment was formed in 1800. It appears that the choice of colour was simply because the green uniforms had already been ordered for the four proposed troops of fencible cavalry in the North Riding. However, these fencibles were never raised, part-time troops of yeomanry cavalry being formed instead (the forerunners of the Yorkshire Hussars). Recruiting parties for the light militia companies were sent out on 1 August 1795 and they were completed on 12 January 1796.

Whitley Camp broke up on 20 October 1795 and the North York Militia went to Tynemouth Barracks and North Shields. At the end of April 1796 it began a march in three divisions to Colchester Barracks in Essex, but its arrival was delayed until 22 June while elections were held in Colchester. It was brigaded with the 11th and 22nd Foot and the Northumberland and Somerset Militia under Maj-Gen William Crosbie. While at Colchester the War Office ordered composite battalions to be formed from the grenadier companies of different battalions: Lt-Col Lord Dundas (as he had now become) was in command of that formed at Colchester. In practice, Lord Fauconberg was rarely with the regiment, and Lord Dundas was often absent, so the effective command devolved on the latter's son, Maj Hon Lawrence Dundas, first commissioned as a captain in 1789 and promoted in 1795. On 28 December 1796 a Corps de Reserve was formed from the North York Militia, the Warwick Fencible Cavalry and the East Norfolk and West Suffolk Militia, ready to march at short notice. Earl Fauconberg resigned the command on grounds of ill-health in 1797 and Lord Dundas was appointed colonel, Maj Lawrence Dundas being promoted to Lt-Col.

=== Supplementary Militia ===
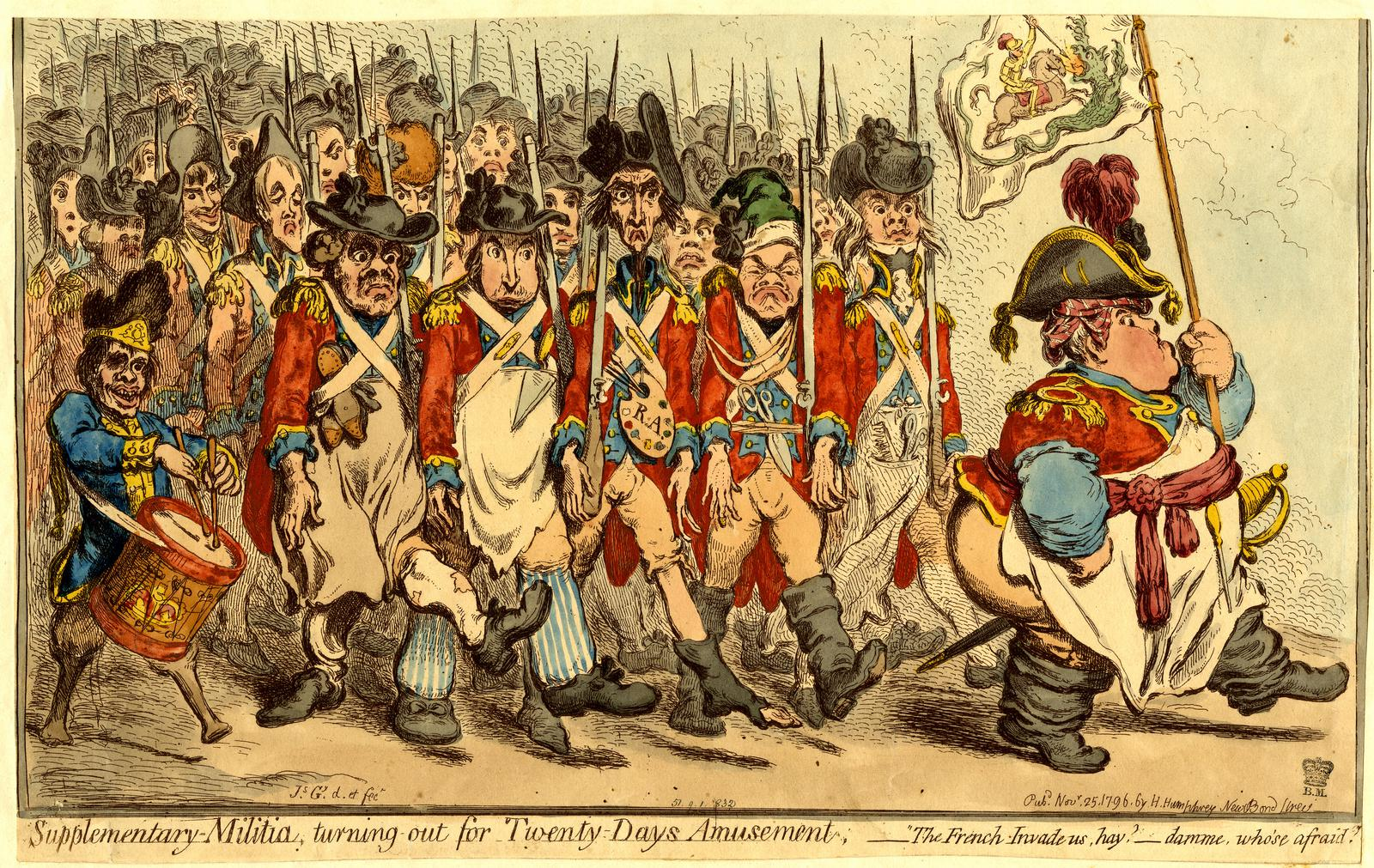
Supplementary-Militia, turning-out for Twenty Days Amusement: 1796 caricature by James Gillray.

In an attempt to have as many men as possible under arms for home defence in order to release regulars, the Government created the Supplementary Militia in 1796, a compulsory levy of men to be trained in their spare time, and to be incorporated in the Militia in emergency. North Yorkshire's additional quota was fixed at 1360 men. The lieutenancies were required to carry out 20 days' initial training as soon as possible. The lieutenancy of the North Riding decided to organise their supplementaries into three battalions of six companies each, but in March this was changed to a single regiment of 10 companies while other supplementary men reinforced the regular militia regiment, which had been depleted by men volunteering for the Regular Army. Initially referred to as the North York Supplementary Militia, later as the 2nd North York Militia the new regiment was commanded by Col Robert Crowe, former Lt-Col of the North York Militia (in 1787) with Turner Straubenzee as his Lt-Col and Sir Robert D'Arcy Hildyard, 4th Baronet as Major. On 19 March 1797 a party of non-commissioned officers (NCOs) and drummers from the North York Militia marched from Colchester to assist in drilling the new levies, and a year later a group of five sergeants, five corporals and 10 privates were sent to be NCOs in the 2nd North York, in exchange for efficient men from the supplementaries.

In May 1797 the North York Supplementaries were part of a brigade in East Yorkshire that also included the three regiments of West Yorkshire Supplementaries as well as the 31st Foot and the Durham, Leicestershire, Nottinghamshire and Northumberland Militia. The flank (grenadier and light) companies from each regiment were formed into composite Grenadier and Light battalions. Several companies of each regiment were stationed at Burstwick, east of Hull, instructed to familiarise themselves thoroughly with the local country and be ready to march at short notice if there was an invasion. Sentries at Hull and along the Humber were doubled. Although the threat to the East Coast diminished after the Battle of Camperdown, the 2nd North Yorks were still stationed at Hull in June 1799, but in common with the other supplementaries was disembodied soon afterwards. The disembodied men were encouraged to volunteer for the regulars, and the North Riding was expected to find 226 men for the 35th Foot, which was stationed there.

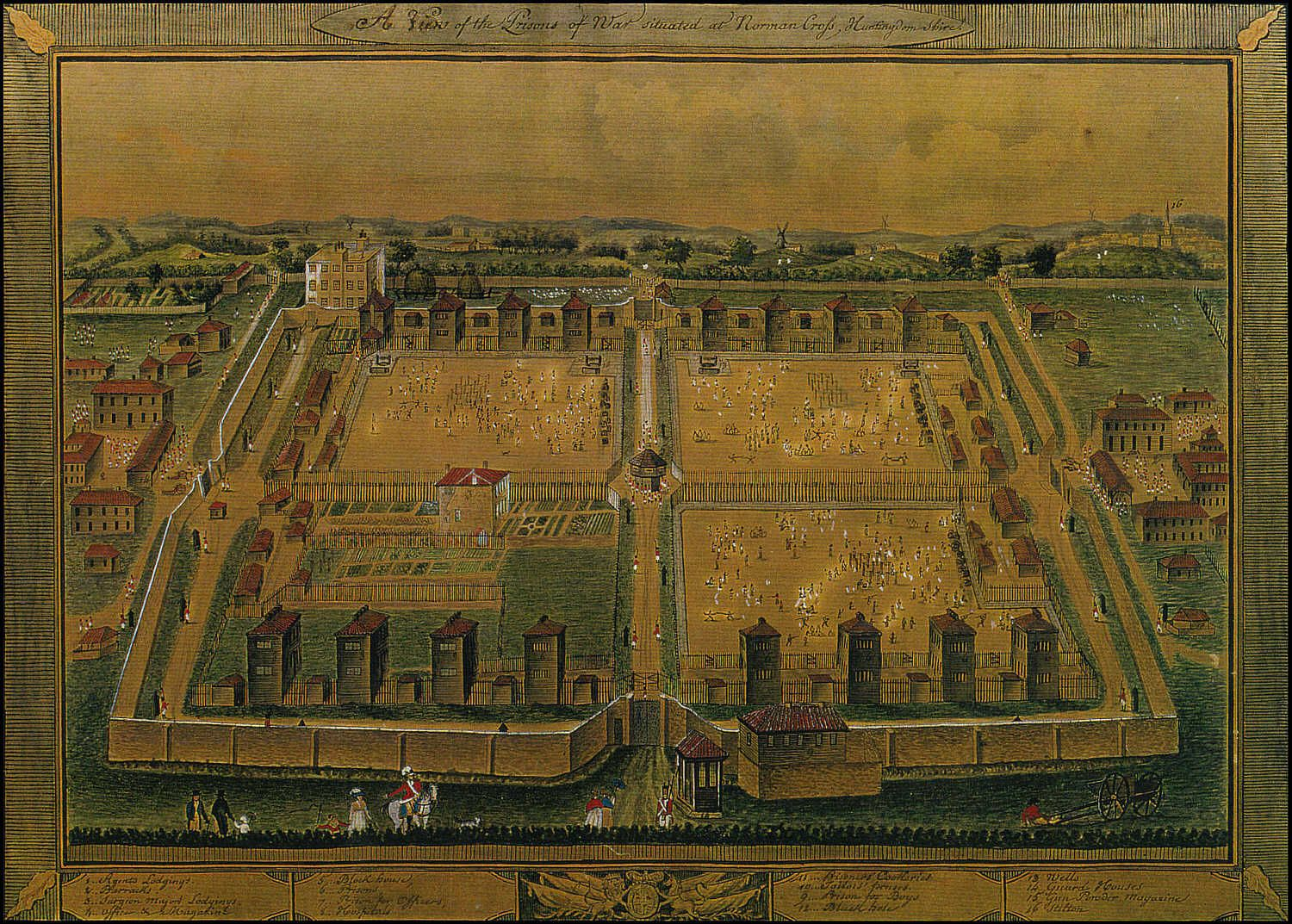
c. 1797 painting of Norman Cross Prison, where the North York Militia was stationed at in the same year

During the Spithead and Nore mutinies in 1797 the North York Militia at Colchester sent parties to watch the roads to catch deserters. In October the regiment marched to Norman Cross Prison, a large Prisoner-of-war camp near Peterborough, where it joined the East Norfolk Militia guarding against the numerous escape attempts. On 30 December the regiment moved to the North Blockhouse at Hull. However, the barracks were too small for the whole regiment, so seven companies were stationed there with some of the men in billets in Sculcoates, four companies went to the barracks in Hull Citadel, and one was detached to Hedon. While at Hull the regiment and detachments received similar orders to the 2nd North Yorks, to make themselves familiar with every road and footpath in the area. On 23 April 1798 the regiment marched (without its guns) to Scotland, camping at West Barn Links near Greenlaw on 1 June, where it was joined by a draft of 264 supplementary militiamen, bringing the strength of the 12 companies to 1146, still 133 short of establishment because of men volunteering to transfer to the Regulars (a whole company of the 15th Foot at Sunderland Barracks was composed of North York Militiamen). The regiment left the camp on 3 October and wintered in Glasgow. The town was very disturbed at the time, and night picquets had to be placed and the sentries doubled, issued with live ammunition. The regiment also had to provide escorts for French prisoners of war on their way to Edinburgh Castle, where the regiment moved in June 1799. In the spring of 1800 there were serious riots in the Edinburgh area, and a 120-strong detachment of the North Yorks had to march down from the castle to Leith to help disperse the mob. The regiment also foiled a breakout attempt by French prisoners in the castle. In June 1800 the regiment was moved to Stirling Castle, with two companies at Linlithgow and two at Falkirk. In November it marched back to Newcastle and Gateshead for the winter, the heavy baggage going by sea. At the end of July 1801 the regiment joined a camp at Whitburn near Sunderland, brigaded with the Durham and 1st and 3rd Royal Lancashire Militia, with the North Yorks trained as the brigade's light infantry. The Supplementary Militia had been disembodied in 1799, but was now re-embodied, a draft of 470 joining the North Yorks at Whitburn, the regiment forming 13 complete companies and one partially complete.

In October news reached Whitburn that peace preliminaries had been agreed. The Treaty of Amiens was signed the following March and the regiment was marched back to the North Riding, where it was disembodied by Lt-Col Dundas on 23 April 1802. The arms and accoutrements of the regiment were stored at Scarborough Castle.

New establishments were set for the disembodied militia in 1802, with the North Yorkshires' quota set at 911 in 10 companies, the light companies having been disbanded in 1801 at the end of the volunteers' 5-year enlistment.

=== Napoleonic Wars ===
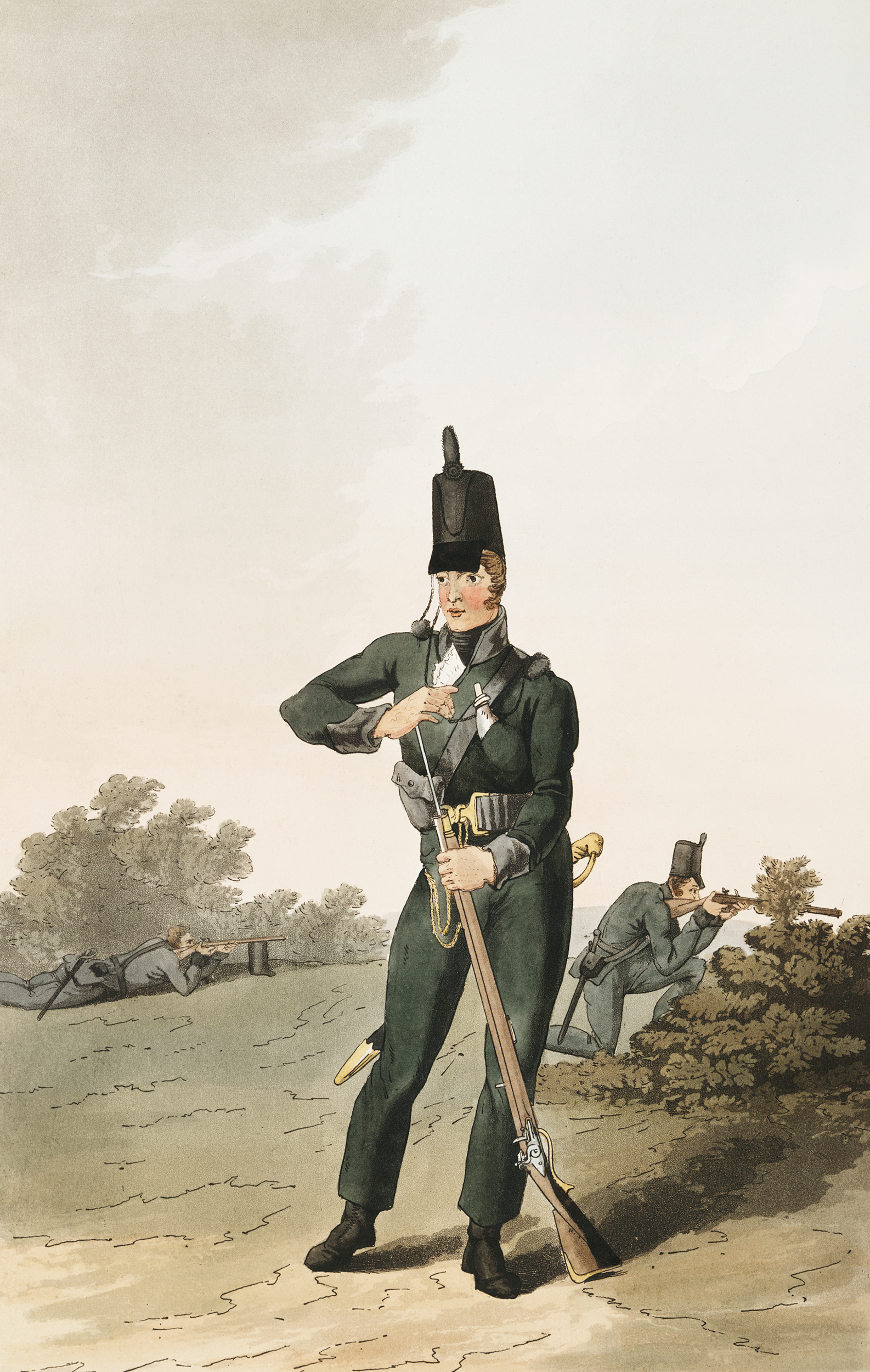
1814 engraving of riflemen of the North York Militia

The Peace of Amiens was short-lived and on 11 March 1803 the militia was ordered to be re-embodied. The North York Militia assembled at Richmond on 18 March with about 800 men in 10 companies. On 19 May it moved to Sunderland, and then marched to Ipswich on 11 July, arriving on 8 August and remaining for nearly two years, camping at Foxall Heath and Lexden Heath in the summers of 1803 and 1804. In August 1803 the remainder of the supplementary militia was added to the regiment, raising its strength to 1157 in 12 companies; Maj Cornelius Smelt was promoted to be an additional lt-col. The Volunteers were reformed in 1803 and Lt-Col Lawrence Dundas resigned to take command of the Cleveland Volunteers. William Frankland, MP, was appointed on 14 December to replace him, and when Smelt also resigned soon afterwards Maj William Hale was promoted on 5 March 1804.

On 6 October 1804 208 rifles were issued to the North York Militia to form two additional companies. Unlike the previous light companies, these wore the true Rifle green uniform, and had buglers rather than drummers.

In July 1805, when Napoleon was massing his 'Army of England' at Boulogne for a projected invasion, the regiment moved into camp at Weymouth with the two rifle companies at Look Battery. On 12 July the militia were ordered to reduce the additional supplementary militia quota added in 1803, but the North Yorks had transferred so many men to the Regulars that only 4 men had to be discharged. With a strength of 1007 men under Lt-Col Frankland the regiment formed part of a militia brigade including the 1st and 2nd Somersets and 1st Royal Lancashires. At the end of the camping season the regiment moved to Gosport, where the principal duty was escorting prisoners-of-war from Portsmouth to prisons around the country. The summer of 1806 was spent in camp on Southsea Common, the autumn in barracks at Portsea and Hilsea, then in December the regiment moved to Eastbourne. In February 1808 it moved to Pleyden Barracks, near Rye, East Sussex, then it camped within Chatham Lines for the summer, providing guards aboard the Prison hulks. In September it moved to Deal Barracks.

There was constant encouragement to the militia to volunteer for the Regulars. While the North Yorks were at Deal so many volunteered for the 95th Rifles forming a new 3rd Battalion at Hythe that Capt Strode of the rifle companies and Lieutenant John Kincaid were granted commissions in that regiment, going on to distinguished careers in the Rifles.

From Deal the regiment went to Shorncliffe Camp in June 1809, then to Brabourne Lees Barracks in October. In March 1810 it marched back to Chatham, and then moved to the Tower of London, where it was deployed on 10 April to protect the Royal Mint during the disturbances over the arrest of Sir Francis Burdett. The disorder was soon over and on 24 April the regiment embarked on transport vessels at Tower Wharf to return to Gravesend and march to Chatham Barracks. On 17 May 1811 the regiment marched to Brighton.

=== North York Local Militia ===
While the Regular Militia were the mainstay of national defence during the Napoleonic Wars, they were supplemented from 1808 by the Local Militia, which were part-time and only to be used within their own districts. These were raised to counter the declining numbers of Volunteers, and if their ranks could not be filled voluntarily the militia ballot was employed. The quota was six times that of the regular militia, so six regiments were formed in the North Riding:

- 1st North York Local Militia: over 1200 men from Richmond and Spennithorne, Col Marwood Turner van Straubenzee, formerly Col of the Loyal Dales Volunteers and Lt-Col 2nd North York Militia, commissioned 22 November 1808
- 2nd North York Local Militia: Richmond, Lt-Col Commandant William Chaytor, commissioned 6 December 1808
- 3rd North York Local Militia: Guisborough and Stokesley, Lt-Col Cmdt Hon Lawrence Dundas, formerly Lt-Col Cmdt Cleveland Volunteers and Lt-Col North York Militia commissioned 24 September 1808
- 4th North York Local Militia: York and Thirsk, Lt-Col Cmdt William Serjeantson, commissioned 28 February 1809
- 5th North York Local Militia: Scarborough, commanded by Lt-Col Cmdt John Fothergill, formerly Maj of the Pickering Lythe Volunteers, commissioned 28 February 1809, followed apparently by George 'Squire' Osbaldeston.
- 6th North York Local Militia: Malton, Lt-Col Cmdt Isaac Leatham, commissioned 28 February 1809, Lt-Col Cmdt Thomas Mitchelson from 12 April 1815

The Local Militia were disbanded in 1816.

=== North York Light Infantry ===
In 1811 an Act was passed to permit interchange between British and Irish Militia regiments. All but 25 men of the North York Militia (and they were mainly time-expired men) volunteered for this service, but it was some time before the regiment was called upon. Also in 1811 the regiments were instructed to establish a regimental school for the children of NCOs and privates, under a sergeant-instructor; the acting CO of the North Yorks replied that the regiment had done so several years before. In 1812 the Duke of York as Commander-in-Chief approved the proposal to train the whole regiment (not just the light and rifle companies) as light infantry. The change was made gradually but by 1814 the regiment became known as the North York Light Infantry Militia.

From Brighton the regiment moved to Nottingham on 27 April 1812, and then to Norman Cross Barracks, where it stayed from May to November. The prisoners at Norman Cross made extra money by Straw plaiting, which required the connivance of the guards in smuggling the material into the camp and the product out. A regimental court martial sat for three days in September, at which four sergeants were reduced to the ranks and two others reprimanded. After Norman Cross the regiment moved to Colchester, and then in June 1813 it went to Harwich. It now prepared for service in Ireland by marching from 2 July to 7 August to reach Glasgow. On 13 September it continued its march to the embarkation port of Portpatrick.

The North York Militia landed at Donaghadee on 18 September and marched to Aughnacloy, arriving on 23 September. It was stationed there until 14 December, and then at Armagh until 30 March 1814, after which it moved to Newry. The Treaty of Paris was signed in May and by June the regiment had received its preparatory orders for disembodiment. However, the American War continued until the Treaty of Ghent, and the regiment remained in service. Then Napoleon's escape from Elba in 1815 led to a renewal of hostilities with France. The North York LI remained in. Ireland, at Dundalk and Drogheda, until after the Battle of Waterloo. The regiment finally returned with a strength of 1029 men to Richmond, where it was disembodied in January 1816.

=== Long Peace ===
After Waterloo there was another long peace. Although officers continued to be commissioned into the militia and ballots were still held, the regiments were rarely assembled for training. The permanent staff at Richmond comprised the adjutant, sergeant-major, 30 sergeants, 30 corporals and 14 drummers, but these were reduced in 1819. The first militia training since disembodiment was held in 1820, during which Lord Dundas retired from the colonelcy and Lt-Col Sheldon Cradock was promoted to replace him. Training was also held in 1821, 1830 and 1831 (at Richmond Racecourse), but not again thereafter. 1831 was the last time the militia ballot was held in England. Officers were occasionally commissioned into the regiment (the 7th Duke of Leeds became colonel in 1846) but the permanent staff was progressively reduced, those sergeants who retired on a Chelsea pension not being replaced. In 1836 the arms (except those of the staff) were returned to the Ordnance Stores at Hull.

== 1852 Reforms ==
The Militia of the United Kingdom was revived by the Militia Act 1852, enacted during a renewed period of international tension. As before, units were raised and administered on a county basis, and filled by voluntary enlistment (although conscription by means of the ballot might be used if the counties failed to meet their quotas). Training was for 56 days on enlistment, then for 21–28 days per year, during which the men received full army pay. Under the Act, Militia units could be embodied by Royal Proclamation for full-time home defence service in three circumstances:

1. 'Whenever a state of war exists between Her Majesty and any foreign power'
2. 'In all cases of invasion or upon imminent danger thereof'
3. 'In all cases of rebellion or insurrection'

The North Riding was given a quota of 608 men to raise in 1852, followed by a further 368 the following year, for a regimental establishment of 976. When the North York LI was reformed in 1852, some of the old officers were still wearing the green uniform of the rifle companies, others the light infantry uniform. At the request of the Duke of Leeds the regiment was redesignated the North York Rifle Militia in March 1853. Most of the remaining officers and staff soon retired and were replaced by younger men. Most of the other ranks (ORs) were recruited by the captains of the 10 companies in their own districts. The first training was held between 12 May and 8 June 1853.

=== Crimean War ===
The annual training in 1854 ran from 2 to 29 June. The Crimean War having broken out, there was considerable recruitment from the militia into the regular army. The despatch of the expeditionary force denuded the forces in Britain, and the militia began to be called out for home defence. The North York Rifles were embodied at Richmond on 12 December 1854, with an OR strength of 14 permanent staff sergeants, 13 volunteer sergeants, 28 corporals and 714 privates. Because of the way the 1852 Act had been drafted, many militiamen enlisted before April 1854 objected to being embodied beyond 56 days, and this led to a serious mutiny in the North York Rifles in March 1855. The ringleader was convicted by Court-martial and given a prison sentence, but the War Office accepted the legal argument and many of the men had to be discharged. During 1855 Richmond Castle was leased to become the depot for the regiment, with new quarters built for the permanent staff who had previously been accommodated in Temple Square in the town. One of the new captains appointed in 1852 had been Earl Cathcart, and he had been rapidly promoted to major and then lt-col. However, he resigned in 1855 in protest at what he saw as a lack of support from the colonel (the Duke of Leeds). His successor Lt-Col Robert Colling had first joined the regiment in 1808 and retired after two months in command; he was replaced by Lt-Col Hamlet Coote Wade (later Wade-Dalton), recently retired from the 13th Light Infantry, which he had served in the First Afghan War.

In August 1855 the North York Rifles were given preparatory orders to move from billets in Richmond to barracks at Bradford, but the move did not come until January 1856, wooden huts having been erected in the barrack square to accommodate all the men. The regiment was reduced to a strength of 455 ORs in seven companies by the number of men volunteering for the regulars. After the war was ended by the Treaty of Paris in March 1856, the regiment returned to Richmond and was disembodied on 17 June 1856.

The North York Rifles was not embodied during the Indian Mutiny, but continued its annual training at Richmond, 21 days in 1858 and 1859, 28 days thereafter. From 1862 preliminary training was held for new recruits. As a rifle regiment, the North Yorks paid particular attention to shooting, building a rifle range at Aislabeck in 1861 and appointing its first instructors in musketry. Militia battalions now had a large cadre of permanent staff (about 30) and a number of the officers were former regulars. Around a third of the recruits and many young officers went on to join the regular army. The regiment struggled to recruit enough junior officers and privates to maintain its strength. The strength at annual training gradually rose to about 567 in 1872 and then stabilised. The Militia Reserve introduced in 1867 consisted of present and former militiamen who undertook to serve overseas in case of war. They were first called out for duty for a few months in 1878 in response to the crisis over the Treaty of San Stefano.

=== Yorkshire Artillery Militia ===
The 1852 reforms had established militia artillery units for the first time. Two new corps of militia artillery were planned for Yorkshire in 1860: the North York Artillery Militia appeared in the Army List for the first time in May, and the East York Artillery Militia in June. But at first the only officer appointed was an adjutant for the North York unit. On 1 December it was announced that the two corps would be amalgamated on 1 January 1861. The new unit was designated the East and North York Artillery Militia (later the Yorkshire Artillery Militia) with its headquarters at Scarborough. The North York Rifles transferred one captain and 256 ORs to the new unit.

== Cardwell and Childers Reforms ==
Under the 'Localisation of the Forces' scheme introduced by the Cardwell Reforms, regular infantry battalions were linked to particular counties or localities, while the county Militia and Volunteers were transferred from the command of the lord lieutenant and affiliated to the new county regiment in a 'sub-district' with a shared depot. Sub-District No 4 (North Riding of Yorkshire) comprised:

- 1st and 2nd Battalions, 19th (The 1st Yorkshire North Riding Regiment of Foot), the 'Princess of Wales's Own' from1875, but generally known as the 'Green Howards'
- North York Rifle Militia at Richmond
- 2nd North York Militia – never formed
- 1st Administrative Battalion, North Riding Rifle Volunteer Corps at Richmond
- 2nd Administrative Battalion, North Riding Rifle Volunteer Corps at Malton
- No 4 Brigade Depot – to be formed at Richmond

The plan had been for each two-battalion regular regiment to have two militia battalions associated with it, and the intention was to raise a second battalion for the North York Militia. However, the existing regiment, recruited mainly from the ironstone miners of the Middlesbrough district, was always understrength. Following the Cardwell Reforms a mobilisation scheme began to appear in the Army List from December 1875. This assigned Regular and Militia units to places in an order of battle of corps, divisions and brigades for the 'Active Army', even though these formations were entirely theoretical, with no staff or services assigned. The North York Militia was assigned to 1st Brigade of 3rd Division, VIII Corps in Scotland. The brigade would have mustered at Melrose in time of war.

=== 4th (North York Militia) Battalion, Green Howards ===
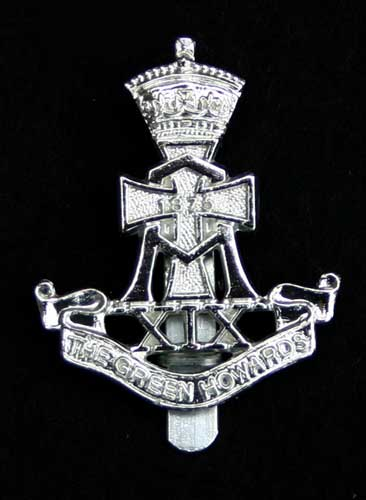
Cap badge of the Green Howards.

The Childers Reforms extended the Cardwell system by combining the linked battalions of each sub-district into a single county regiment. On 1 July 1881 the 19th Foot became the Princess of Wales's Own (Yorkshire Regiment) – still generally known as the Green Howards. Because the district had been unable to raise a second militia battalion, the 5th West Yorkshire Militia recruited from around Knaresborough joined as the 3rd Battalion, while the North York Militia became the 4th, no longer uniformed as Rifles:

- 1st and 2nd Battalions
- 3rd (5th West York Militia) Battalion, later at Richmond
- 4th (North York Militia) Battalion at Richmond
- 1st Volunteer Battalion at Richmond
- 2nd Volunteer Battalion at Scarborough

The outbreak of the Anglo-Egyptian War in 1882 meant that a number of militia battalions, including the 4th Green Howards, were trained for 56 rather than 28 days, part of which was carried out at Strensall Common near York, which was being developed as a tactical training ground. From now on the battalion training was routinely carried out at tented camp (often Richmond Racecourse) rather than the men being billeted. In 1888 the battalion trained as part of a brigade at Strensall; several staff sergeants died as a result of bronchial infections contracted in the wet conditions

=== Second Boer War ===
In 1899, the 4th Bn only had eight officers – a colonel, a major, five captains (one seconded from another unit) and one subaltern – but the outbreak of the Second Boer War and the chance of seeing action brought an influx of candidates for commissions. In December the Militia Reserve were called out, and by June 1900 185 reservists from the 4th Bn had been sent to South Africa, mostly to the 1st Bn, serving in the Relief of Kimberley and the Battle of Paardeberg. A few served with 3rd (5th West York Militia) Bn, which had been embodied in December and volunteered for active service. 4th Battalion was not embodied until 5 May 1900, at Strensall Camp, when it was 444 strong after active recruiting to replace the reservists; it also had the home details of the 1st, 2nd and 3rd Bns attached to it. At Strensall 4th Green Howards were brigaded with three other militia battalions: 3rd East York, 3rd West York and 3rd King's Own Yorkshire Light Infantry. After a summer of training the 4th Bn was moved in October into Hillsborough Barracks at Sheffield. The war appeared to be coming to an end, and militia battalions at home began to be disembodied. However, the Boers continued guerrilla warfare, and the 4th Bn remained embodied into 1901. In February the battalion provided volunteers for a Mounted Infantry (MI) company (see below) that saw active service in South Africa. In April 1901 4th Green Howards was finally asked to volunteer for active service and did so, but by now the battalion was so depleted by the departure of the reservists and the MI that not enough fit men old enough for overseas service (the age limit was 20) remained to prepare a viable battalion, and the offer was not accepted. The companies began travelling to Strensall and Fulford Barracks for their summer training. Then on 30 June orders came to disembody the battalion, which was carried out next day.

By September 1901 some 16 officers of 4th Bn were attached to other units, many of them in South Africa. However, the demand for garrison troops in South Africa continued, 4th Green Howards was re-embodied at Richmond on 17 February 1902 and the men agreed to volunteer for overseas service. It moved by train to Fulford Barracks for re-clothing and a short musketry course. On 10 March the battalion went to Southampton and sailed next day aboard the SS Assaye. It embarked under the command of the newly promoted Lt-Col Bernard Harrison with a strength of 29 officers (all but eight seconded from other units) and 564 ORs (recruitment had continued during the disembodiment, and the age limit had been lowered to 19). It arrived at Cape Town on 1 April 1902 and moved by train to Vryburg (a few shots being fired at the trains), arriving on 4 April. Its task was to garrison the blockhouse line to Maribogo on the Vryburg–Mafeking railway. When it arrived the few large blockhouses were about 6 miles (9.7 km) apart, and the battalion set to work building small ones at half-mile intervals, connected with each other by barbed-wire fences and communicating by telephone. Having built these blockhouses at a rate of six per day, the whole battalion was garrisoning them by 22 April, with battalion HQ moved to Devondale siding on the railway. A large 'drive' by four columns towards the blockhouse line was organised for 11 May and the blockhouse garrisons were strengthened, but the Boers being pursued would not face the blockhouses and fled south, leaving their livestock, waggons, and many prisoners. Over the following weeks the battalion suffered badly from Enteric fever. Peace was declared on 31 May and the battalion dismantled the blockhouses and moved to Devondale. On 6 July it was joined by the MI detachment (see below) and on 28 August started out by train for Cape Town. On 6 September it embarked on the mail ship Tagus, arriving at Southampton on 24 September. It went by train to Richmond where it was disembodied. During its short active service the battalion had lost six men killed or died of disease. The participants received the Queen's South Africa Medal with clasps for 'Cape Colony' and 'South Africa 1902', and the battalion was granted the Battle honour South Africa 1902.

=== Yorkshire Mounted Infantry Company ===
The nature of the fighting in South Africa required large numbers of mounted troops. In 1901 volunteers for the Mounted Infantry were invited from units at home. They had to be at least nineteen and a half years old, with not less than nine months' service. The plan had been to organise companies of 141, half-companies of 70, or sections of 35. One such company was formed in the North-Eastern District, attached to 4th Bn Northumberland Fusiliers at Fulford Barracks, York. 4th Green Howards provided two officers and 31 ORs, together with 18 ORs from the attached depot details of the Green Howards, forming two sections of the company. The other two sections were formed from details of the West Yorkshire, East Yorkshire, South Staffordshire and North Staffordshire Regiments, and it was commanded by Capt A.O. Norman of the Gordon Highlanders.

After a short riding course at Fulford, the company left York for embarkation to South Africa on 29 March, landing at Port Elizabeth. The men went by train to Elandsfontein, then to Klerksdorp where they were issued with their horses and joined the 21st Mounted Infantry Battalion in a column under Col Edward Ingouville-Williams. The company spent the next six months continuously 'on trek' in the Western Transvaal with various columns supporting Lieutenant-General Lord Methuen's force. It moved through Bloemhof, Ventersdorp, Krugersdorp and along the Marico Valley to Zeerust, then to Taungs on the Kimberley railway. It skirmished with De la Rey and Kemp's commandos, and took part in the capture of De la Rey's wagon convoy. In July 1901 word came of another convoy and the Yorkshire Company was the first to saddle up and seize the wagons. One man of the Green Howard details was killed near Taungs. From Taungs the company continued through Rustenburg, arriving from Krugersdorp just too late to help Col Robert Kekewich in the action at Moedwil.

In about September 1901 Capt Norman was invalided home and the company, leaving its horses at Klerksdorp, was sent to the MI Depot at Pretoria for a rest. The authorities had decided that the composite MI companies did not work well together, so they were distributed among their parent regiments. The two Green Howards sections were sent by rail to Machadorp, where they drew fresh horses and joined the MI Company of 1st Green Howards at Lydenburg. This company had been formed at the beginning of the war and had seen considerable service as part of 4th MI Battalion. The two sections remained with this company for the rest of the war, serving as part of Col C.W. Parks's column, the only column operating north of the Delgoa Bay Railway. In December news arrived that the fugitive Transvaal Government had crossed the railway into the Roossenekal area, and Parks was reinforced and sent in an attempt to capture it. The column was attacked at Elandspruit on 24 December, when the Boers captured trenches overlooking the camp. There were numerous casualties and some 40 horses were shot in camp, but the Manchester Regiment drove the Boers out with the bayonet. The company ended the war participating in 'drives' in Northern Transvaal under Maj-Gen Bruce Hamilton. After the war, the MI sections rejoined 4th Bn at Devondale on 6 July.

== Disbandment ==
After the Boer War, the future of the militia was called into question. There were moves to reform the Auxiliary Forces (Militia, Yeomanry and Volunteers) to take their place in the six Army Corps proposed by the Secretary of State for War, St John Brodrick. However, little of Brodrick's scheme was carried out. Under the more sweeping Haldane Reforms of 1908, the Militia was replaced by the Special Reserve (SR), a semi-professional force whose role was to provide reinforcement drafts for regular units serving overseas in wartime, rather like the earlier Militia Reserve. However, the always-understrength 4th Green Howards did not transfer to the SR and was disbanded on 31 March 1908.

== Commanders ==
=== Colonels ===
The following served as Colonel of the Regiment after it was reformed in 1759:

- Sir Ralph Milbanke, 5th Baronet, Richmondshire Battalion, January 1759, then combined regiment from 1778 to October 1779
- Thomas Duncombe, Cleveland & Bulmer Battalion, January 1759
- Henry Belasyse, 2nd Earl Fauconberg, appointed 18 November 1779, resigned 25 May 1797
- Thomas Dundas, 1st Baron Dundas, promoted 25 May 1797, retired 14 June 1820
- Robert Crowe, 2nd North York, commissioned 22 February 1797
- Sheldon Cradock, promoted 14 June 1820
- Francis D'Arcy-Osborne, 7th Duke of Leeds, commissioned 11 February 1846, died 4 May 1859

Following the 1852 Militia Act colonels were no longer appointed to the militia and the lieutenant-colonel became the commanding officer (CO); at the same time, the position of Honorary Colonel was introduced.

=== Lieutenant-Colonels ===
Lieutenant-Colonels of the regiment from1852 included the following:

- Gregory Elsley, promoted 1820
- George Healey, promoted 1852
- Alan Cathcart, 3rd Earl Cathcart, capt 1852, maj 1853, lt-col 1854 resigned 1855
- Robert Colling, ensign 1808, capt 1808, lt-col 1855; retired 1855
- Hamlet Coote Wade, formerly 13th Foot, appointed 1855, became CO 4 May 1859
- Charles Henry Dowker, formerly captain, 1st Foot, promoted 10 December 1873, retired 1883
- Charles Sidney Bradley, promoted 1883, resigned 14 October 1885
- Robert George Hopkinson, promoted 14 November 1885
- Byron Cary, 12th Viscount Falkland, former Lt-Col Royal Sussex Regiment, appointed 6 October 1891, retired 10 November 1896
- James Wilson Richardson, promoted 18 November 1896
- Bernard Gauntlett Harrison, promoted 1902
- John Charles Rivis, promoted 9 April 1904

=== Honorary Colonels ===
The following served as Honorary Colonel of the regiment:

- Brevet-Col Hamlet Coote Wade-Dalton, CB, former CO, appointed 17 December 1873, died 1891
- Col Robert George Hopkinson, former CO, appointed 29 August 1891

=== Other notable officers ===
Other notable officers of the regiment included:

- Miles Stapleton, 8th Lord Beaumont, captain 1824
- Sir Thomas Clifford–Constable, 2nd Baronet, captain 1834
- Sir George Cooke, 7th Baronet, captain 1789
- Sir Robert D'Arcy Hildyard, 4th Baronet, major 1797
- Alan Hill-Walker, commissioned as a sub-lieutenant 1876, gained a regular commission in the 58th Foot and won a Victoria Cross at the Battle of Laing's Nek in 1881
- John Hutton, MP. captain 1869
- Sir John Kincaid, ensign 1807, later to 95th Rifles
- Sir John Lawson, 2nd Baronet of Brough Hall, captain 1853
- George Osborne, 6th Duke of Leeds (as Marquess of Carmarthen) commanded a company as a captain in 1796, later Lord Lieutenant of the North Riding
- George Osborne, 9th Duke of Leeds (as Marquess of Carmarthen), captain 1852
- George Phipps, 2nd Marquess of Normanby (as Earl of Mulgrave) formerly lieutenant, Coldstream Guards, commissioned as major 18 August 1846
- Cornelius Smelt, formerly 35th Foot, major from 1797, promoted to lt-col 1803, later Lieutenant governor of the Isle of Man

== Heritage and ceremonial ==
=== Uniforms and insignia ===
There is some dispute whether the facings on the red coats of the two regiments reformed in 1759 were green or blue. The latter is more likely, because the regimental colours were blue, bearing the coat of arms of the Lord Lieutenant, the Earl of Holderness. In any case, when the men were issued with their new clothing in 1760 Holderness changed the facings to black, which they retained until 1881. The officers' lace was also changed from gold to silver in 1760. In 1781 the officers wore 'helmets' (presumably the new Tarleton helmet) instead of the cocked hat, perhaps an early indication of light infantry character in the regiment.

As described above, the uniform of the light companies of 1795 was green, with regimental black facings, while the rifle companies of 1804 wore true Rifle green with black facings, distinguished from the 95th Rifles only by their buttons. In 1810 the regiment requested green greatcoats for the two companies, but the government did not supply these. Between 1812 and the reformation of the regiment in 1852 the grenadier company wore red coats with epaulettes, the rifle companies green jackets with three rows of buttons, and remaining (light) companies red coats with swallow tails and wings, with a green plume in the Shako./> When the regiment became rifles in 1853 the whole regiment adopted rifle green jackets with black facings. On becoming a battalion of the Green Howards in 1881, it was forced to adopt the red tunic and white facings of an English line regiment, with the addition of the letter 'M' on the shoulder straps. The green jackets continued to be used when not on parade, until worn out. The Green Howards regained their traditional grass green facings in 1899.

In 1791 Lt-Col Dundas purchased new shoulder-belt plates for the officers: these were silver ovals bearing the White Rose of York, the first reference to that badge being used by the regiment. At the inspection of the regiment in 1811 its right to wear the badge was questioned, but Lord Dundas claimed that permission had been granted by King George III as far back as 1805 when the regiment was quartered at Weymouth while the Royal Family was in residence. Authority to use the badge was formally granted to the North York and to the 2nd and 3rd West York Militia on 26 August 1811. The regiment appears to have worn the white rose as a shako plate. The officers' pouch-belt plate from 1855 to 1881 had the white rose within a crowned wreath, the crown resting on a label inscribed 'NORTH YORK' and a label beneath the rose inscribed 'RIFLES'.

Early buttons worn by officers appear to have been silver with a border and the letters 'NY' in the middle, later 'Y / NR / M'. The ORs wore a pewter button marked 'NY'. Buttons from the Napoleonic period show 'NYM' in various scripts. Then (possibly after 1811) the regiment used the white rose with a crown above and 'NORTH YORK' round the edge. Officers' buttons were silver with the rose surrounded by a crowned garter, the wording 'NORTH YORK' at the bottom. The North York Supplementary Militia appears to have worn buttons with a garter star, the garter lettered 'N. YORKRE SUP. REGT.', changing to 'SECOND NORTH YORKSHIRE' when the regiment was redesignated. The black Coatee button worn on the rifle companies' uniform prior to1855 had a crowned bugle-horn, with a spray of leaves beneath and the title above.

=== Precedence ===
In the Seven Years' War militia regiments camped together took precedence according to the order in which they had arrived, then from 1760 they drew lots to determine their precdence in camp. During the War of American Independence the counties were given an order of precedence determined by ballot each year. For the North Riding the positions were:

- 13th on 1 June 1778
- 39th on 12 May 1779
- 10th on 6 May 1780
- 13th on 28 April 1781
- 43rd on 7 May 1782

The militia order of precedence balloted for in 1793 (the North Riding was 33rd) remained in force throughout the French Revolutionary War. Another ballot for precedence took place at the start of the Napoleonic War, when the North Riding was 44th.This order continued until 1833. In that year the King drew the lots for individual regiments. Those raised before the peace of 1763 took the first 47 places: the North Yorkshire was 22nd. The list was adjusted in 1855 and no satisfactory reason was ever given for the 5th West Yorkshires, raised in 1853, being given the vacant 4th place, which gave it seniority over the North Yorks (still 22nd), which meant that they became the 3rd and 4th battalions respectively of the Green Howards in 1881.

=== Battle honour ===
The battalion colour bore the following Battle honour awarded for its overseas service in In the Second Boer War: South Africa 1902.

== See also ==
- Trained band
- Militia (England)
- Militia (Great Britain)
- Militia (United Kingdom)
- Green Howards
- Yorkshire Artillery Militia
