= Margaret Pennyman =

English poet (bap. 1685, d. 1733)

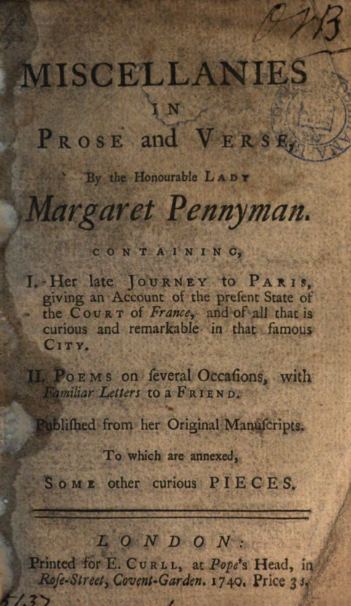
- Miscellanies by Lady Margaret Pennyman
- Born: Margaret Angier poss. 1685
- Died: 16 June 1733
- Known for: writing and poetry
- Spouse: Thomas Pennyman

Lady Margaret Pennyman born Margaret Angier (bap. 1685 – 16 June 1733) was an English poet. Her journal records her poetry, her disastrous marriage and the loss of a fortune in an economic French bubble scheme.

== Life ==
Pennyman was baptised at St Margaret's, Westminster in May 1685. Her mother Jane had been born with the name of Slater or Salter and her father was a carpenter who worked in the City of Westminster and he at one time did work for Charles II.

In 1703 she eloped, married and separated from Thomas Pennyman from Yorkshire. He had come into money when his elder brother died. Thomas was said to be the son of "Sir James Pennyman" and she had £2,000 but this did not save the marriage. She had married him in a public house and in a church. There is a list of Pennyman baronets.

By 1720 she was in Paris trying to gain some benefit for the stock she bought in the Mississippi scheme. Most of her money was gone. She recorded this journey and some poems in a journal which was published, but not until after her death. She recorded Catholic ceremonies and notes that she saw Louis XV at church.

== Death and legacy ==
Her "Miscellanies in Prose and Verse, by the Honourable Lady Margaret Pennyman" was published in 1739 by Edmund Curll noting she had died penniless. Edmund Curll is not a very reliable source. She had died on 16 June 1733 and she had been buried by her brother in the church where she was baptised.
