= Sir William Pennyman, 1st Baronet =

English landowner, soldier and politician

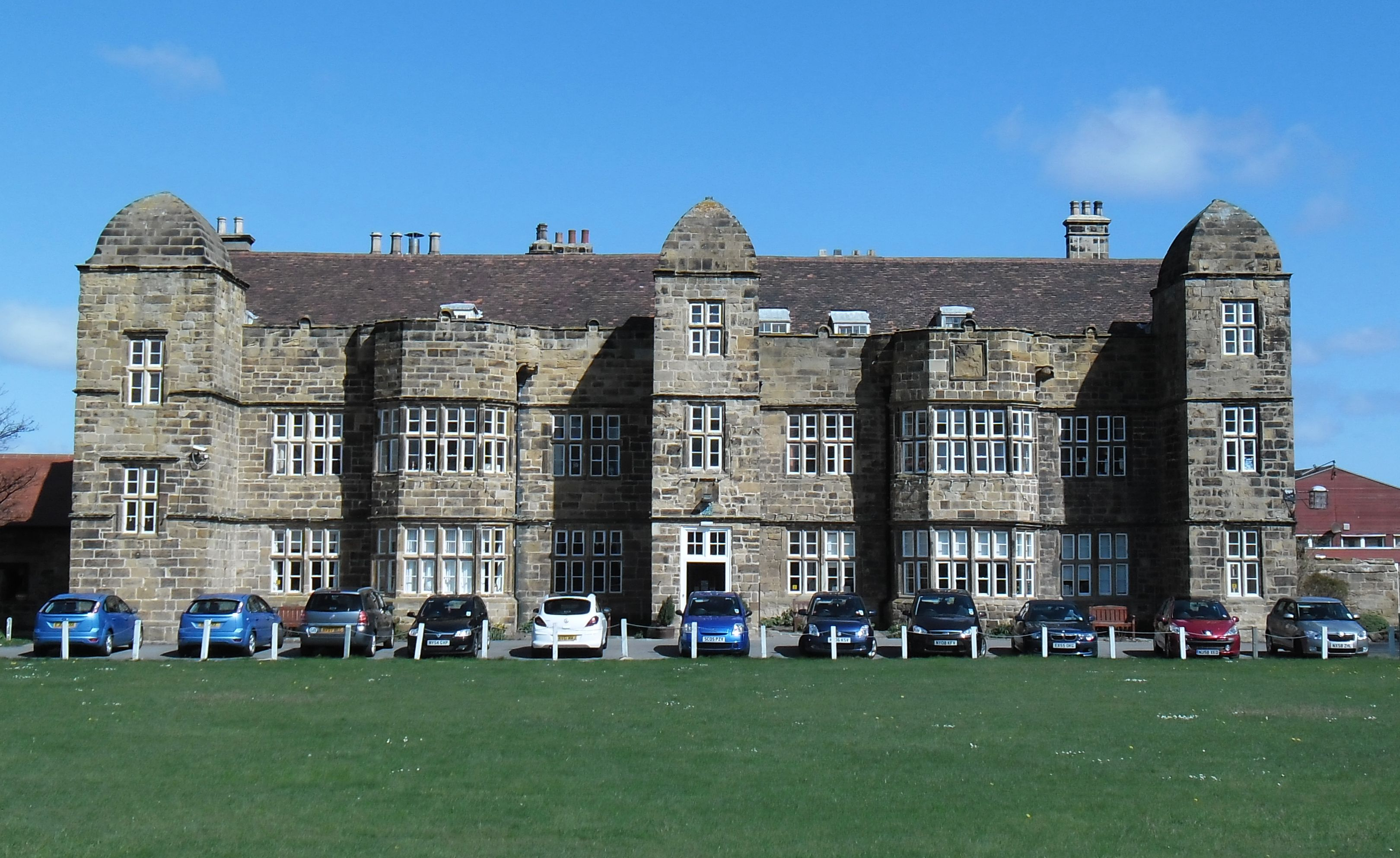
Marske Hall

Sir William Pennyman (1607 – 22 August 1643) was an English landowner, soldier and politician.

He was the illegitimate son of William Pennyman (died 1628) a Clerk in Chancery and was educated at Christ Church, Oxford and Inner Temple. His father purchased a third of the Manor of Marske, Yorkshire, in present-day Redcar and Cleveland, in 1616. Pennyman later married Ann Atherton, granddaughter of John Atherton and Katherine Conyers and heiress to the remaining two thirds. His wife was also the granddaughter of Sir John Byron, whose daughter Ann married into the Atherton's.

He built Marske Hall in 1625. He acquired substantial wealth from alum mining on the Marske estate.

He was a supporter of King Charles I and served as a member of the Council of the North and as an officer of the Star Chamber. He was created a Baronet by Charles on 6 May 1628.

He served as High Sheriff of Yorkshire in 1635-1636 and later was Deputy Lieutenant of that county.

In 1638 he commanded the Langbaurgh Trained Band in the war against the Scots.

He was Member of Parliament for Richmond 1640–1642 in both the Short Parliament and Long Parliament but was barred from sitting in 1642.

Pennyman was one of the witnesses called on to testify at the trial of Thomas Wentworth, 1st Earl of Strafford on the earl's conduct concerning the Yorkshire petition.

At the commencement of the English Civil War he again raised, together with his half-brother James, a regiment of which he served as Colonel, which he led for the King at the Battle of Nottingham and the Battle of Edgehill in 1642.

He was appointed by Charles as Governor of Oxford. He died at Oxford of the plague in 1643 and the manor passed to his half-brother James, who was made 1st Baronet Pennyman of Ormesby in 1664.

Baronetage of England
New creation	Baronet (of Marske); 1628–1643	Extinct
