= Sir John Milbanke, 10th Baronet =

Recipient of the Victoria Cross

Lieutenant-Colonel Sir John Peniston Milbanke VC Bt
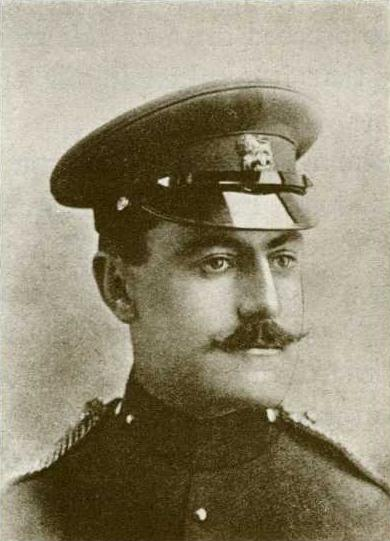
- Born: 9 October 1872; Belgravia, London
- Died: 21 August 1915 (aged 42); Suvla, Gallipoli, Ottoman Turkey
- Military career
- Allegiance: United Kingdom
- Branch: British Army
- Service years: 1892–1910; 1914–1915
- Rank: Lieutenant Colonel
- Units: 10th Hussars; Sherwood Rangers Yeomanry
- Conflicts: Second Boer War; World War I
- Awards: Victoria Cross

Lieutenant-Colonel Sir John Peniston Milbanke, 10th Baronet, VC (9 October 1872 – 21 August 1915) was a British Army officer, and a recipient of the Victoria Cross, the highest award for gallantry in the face of the enemy that can be awarded to British and Commonwealth forces.

== Early life ==
Milbanke was born the son of Sir Peniston Milbanke, 9th Baronet, in London. In 1886, he began attendance at Harrow School, where he became a close friend of Winston Churchill. He was commissioned as a second lieutenant in the 10th Hussars on 23 November 1892, and promoted to lieutenant on 18 April 1894.

== Second Boer War ==
Following the outbreak of the Second Boer War, Milbank was posted to South Africa as Aide-de-camp to Lieutenant-General Sir John French from October 1899.

Milbanke was 27 years old, serving as a lieutenant in the 10th Hussars during the Second Boer War, when the following deed took place near Colesberg for which he was awarded the VC:

On the 5th January, 1900, during a reconnaissance near Colesberg, Sir John Milbanke, when retiring under fire with a small patrol of the 10th Hussars, notwithstanding the fact that he had just been severely wounded in the thigh, rode back to the assistance of one of the men whose pony was exhausted, and who was under fire from some Boers who had dismounted. Sir John Milbanke took the man up on his own horse under a most galling fire and brought him safely back to camp.

After a brief stay back home, he was on the SS Umbria leaving Southampton for South Africa in late March 1900. Promoted to captain on 17 April 1900, he served in South Africa until the end of hostilities when peace was declared in June 1902. He left Cape Town on board the SS Walmer Castle in late June 1902, and arrived at Southampton the following month. In early October 1902 he returned to his regiment as it was posted to Mhow in British India.

== Marriage ==
In 1900, he married Amelia Crichton, with whom he had one son, John, who became the 11th Baronet.

== World War I ==
In 1914, having retired from the regular army, he became lieutenant-colonel of the Sherwood Rangers. He was killed in action at Suvla, Gallipoli, Turkey, on 21 August 1915 and is commemorated on the Helles Memorial.

== The Medal ==
His Victoria Cross is displayed at The King's Royal Hussars Museum in Winchester, England.

Coat of arms of Sir John Milbanke, 10th Baronet
Crest A lion's head erased Gules charged with a bend Ermine. Escutcheon Gules a bend Ermine on a canton Or a lion's head erased of the first. Motto Resolute And Firm

== See also ==
- Milbanke Baronets

Baronetage of England
Preceded by Peniston Milbanke	Baronet (of Halnaby); 1899–1915	Succeeded by John Milbanke
