= Yorkshire Artillery Militia =

Auxiliary unit of the British Army

Yorkshire Artillery Militia 4th Brigade, Northern Division, RA Yorkshire Artillery (Western Division) RA Yorkshire (Duke of York's Own) RGA (M)
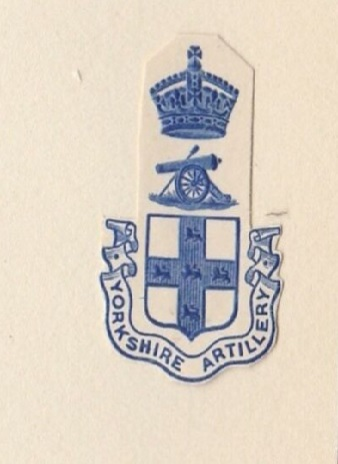
- Letterhead, Yorkshire Militia Artillery, c1890
- Active: 1860–1909
- Country: United Kingdom
- Branch: Militia
- Role: Garrison Artillery
- Part of: Northern Division, RA (1882–89); Western Division, RA (1889–1902)
- Garrison/HQ: Scarborough, North Yorkshire

The Yorkshire Artillery Militia was a part-time reserve unit of Britain's Royal Artillery based in the East and North Ridings of Yorkshire from 1860 to 1909.

== Background ==
The long-standing national Militia of the United Kingdom was revived by the Militia Act 1852, enacted during a period of international tension. As before, units were raised and administered on a county basis, and filled by voluntary enlistment (although conscription by means of the Militia Ballot might be used if the counties failed to meet their quotas). Training was for 56 days on enlistment, then for 21–28 days per year, during which the men received full army pay. Under the Act, Militia units could be embodied by Royal Proclamation for full-time service in three circumstances:

1. 'Whenever a state of war exists between Her Majesty and any foreign power'.
2. 'In all cases of invasion or upon imminent danger thereof'.
3. 'In all cases of rebellion or insurrection'.

The 1852 Act introduced Militia Artillery units in addition to the traditional infantry regiments. Their role was to man coastal defences and fortifications, relieving the Royal Artillery (RA) for active service.

== History ==
Two new corps of Militia artillery were planned for Yorkshire in 1860: the North York Artillery Militia appeared in the Army List for the first time in May, and the East York Artillery Militia in June. But at first the only officer appointed was an Adjutant for the North York unit. On 1 December it was announced that 'Her Majesty has been graciously pleased to direct that the two Regiments of Artillery Militia of the East and North Ridings of Yorkshire shall, on after the 1st ult. be united and form one Artillery Corps of Militia'.

The new unit, from 1 January 1861, was designated the East and North York Artillery Militia with its headquarters established at Scarborough, North Yorkshire. Major H.T. Fryers from the Royal Lancashire Militia Artillery, a Half-pay Captain in the Royal Artillery, was appointed Lieutenant-Colonel Commandant of the unit, and three captains, one from the East York Militia with 237 volunteers, one from the North York Rifle Militia with 256 and one from the 1st West York Rifles Militia with 26, formed its cadre.

The unit was assigned the number 31 in the order of precedence, dropping to 32 when a more senior unit split into two in 1867. The combined title was retained until 1873 when the unit became simply the Yorkshire Artillery Militia. Lieutenant-Colonel Fryers remained in command until 9 February 1876, when he became honorary colonel and was succeeded by Marmaduke J. Grimston (died 1879), who had come from the East Yorkshire Infantry Militia and had been Major of the Yorkshire Artillery Militia since 5 March 1863, and then by Major Arthur Brooksbank (1831–1903) of Middleton Hall, Driffield, a former captain in the 38th Foot. Lieutenant-Colonel James Digby Legard (later Sir James Legard), who had served as a captain with the RA in the Anglo-Zulu War, was appointed to the command when Col Brooksbank became Hon Col.

Following the Cardwell Reforms a mobilisation scheme began to appear in the Army List from December 1875. This assigned places in an order of battle of the 'Garrison Army' to Militia Artillery units: the Yorkshire Artillery's war station was in the Sheerness Division of the Thames and Medway Defences.

The Artillery Militia was reorganised into 11 divisions of garrison artillery in 1882, and the Yorkshire unit joined Northern Division, taking the title of 4th Brigade, Northern Division, RA. When the Northern Division was abolished in 1889 its militia were transferred to the Western Division and the unit's title was altered to The Yorkshire Artillery (Western Division) RA.

From 1899 the Militia artillery formally became part of the Royal Garrison Artillery (RGA), and when the RGA abolished the divisional structure the unit at Sunderland took the title of Yorkshire RGA (M) on 1 January 1902, and added a subtitle in honour of the Duke of York (the future King George V) to become the Yorkshire (Duke of York's Own) RGA (M).

== Embodiments ==
The York Artillery Militia was only embodied once, during the Second Boer War, from 1 May to 12 October 1900. However, before the official embodiment, an 80-man detachment of the unit under the command of Capt William Fell had been called out on 13 March 1900 to restore order during a riot at Scarborough. Trouble had broken out during a pro-Boer meeting attended by Samuel Cronwright-Schreiner, brother-in-law of the premier of Cape Colony. The angry crowd showed no antagonism towards the gunners and ended up cheering them and singing Soldiers of the Queen and other patriotic songs before dispersing. Captain Fell later became commanding officer (3 December 1905).

== Disbandment ==
After the Boer War, the future of the Militia was called into question. There were moves to reform the Auxiliary Forces (Militia, Yeomanry and Volunteers) to take their place in the six Army Corps proposed by St John Brodrick as Secretary of State for War. Some batteries of Militia Artillery were to be converted to field artillery. However, little of Brodrick's scheme was carried out.

Under the sweeping Haldane Reforms of 1908, the Militia was replaced by the Special Reserve, a semi-professional force whose role was to provide reinforcement drafts for Regular units serving overseas in wartime. Although the majority of the officers and men of the Yorkshire RGA (M) accepted transfer to the Special Reserve Royal Field Artillery and the unit became the Yorkshire (Duke of York's) Royal Field Reserve Artillery on 17 July 1908, all these units were scrapped in 1909. the Yorkshire unit disbanding on 31 October 1909. Instead the men of the RFA Special Reserve would form Brigade Ammunition Columns for the Regular RFA brigades on the outbreak of war.

== Honorary colonels ==
The following served as honorary colonel of the unit:

- Lt-Col H.T. Fryers, appointed 9 February 1876
- Lt-Col Arthur Brooksbank, appointed 23 November 1889
- Lt-Col James Digby Legard, appointed 24 January 1906
