= Portrait of Sir Ralph Milbanke =

Painting by James Northcote

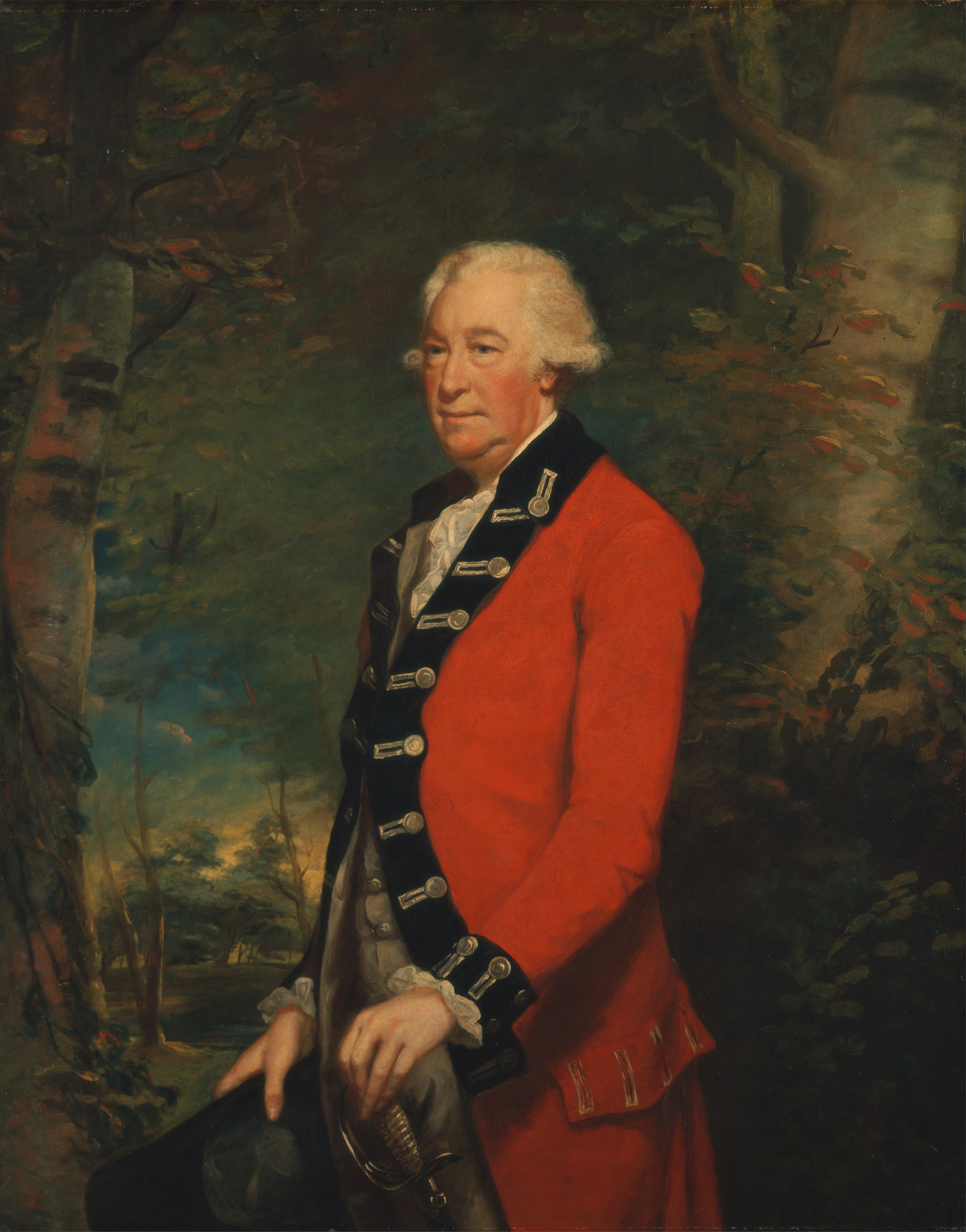
- Artist: James Northcote
- Year: 1784
- Type: Oil on canvas, portrait
- Dimensions: 130 cm × 100 cm (50 in × 40 in)
- Location: Yale Center for British Art; Connecticut

Portrait of Sir Ralph Milbanke is a 1784 portrait painting by the British artist James Northcote. It depicts the English landowner and politician Sir Ralph Milbanke, 5th Baronet. Milbanke is shown at full-length in the uniform of the North Yorkshire Militia against a rural background. He had commanded a detachment of the unit during the Hexham Massacre of 1762. Milbanke was the grandfather of the Prime Minister Lord Melbourne whose premiership stretched into the early Victorian era

Northcote has been a pupil of Joshua Reynolds and was elected a member of the Royal Academy in 1787. Today the painting is in the Yale Center for British Art in Connecticut, having been acquired as part of the Paul Mellon Collection.

== Bibliography ==
- Brown, Colin. Lady M: The Life and Loves of Elizabeth Lamb, Viscountess Melbourne 1751-1818. Amberley Publishing, 2018
- Egerton, Judy. George Stubbs, Painter. Yale University Press, 2007
