= Sir Ralph Milbanke, 5th Baronet =

British politician and militia officer (1721–1798)

Sir Ralph Milbanke Bt
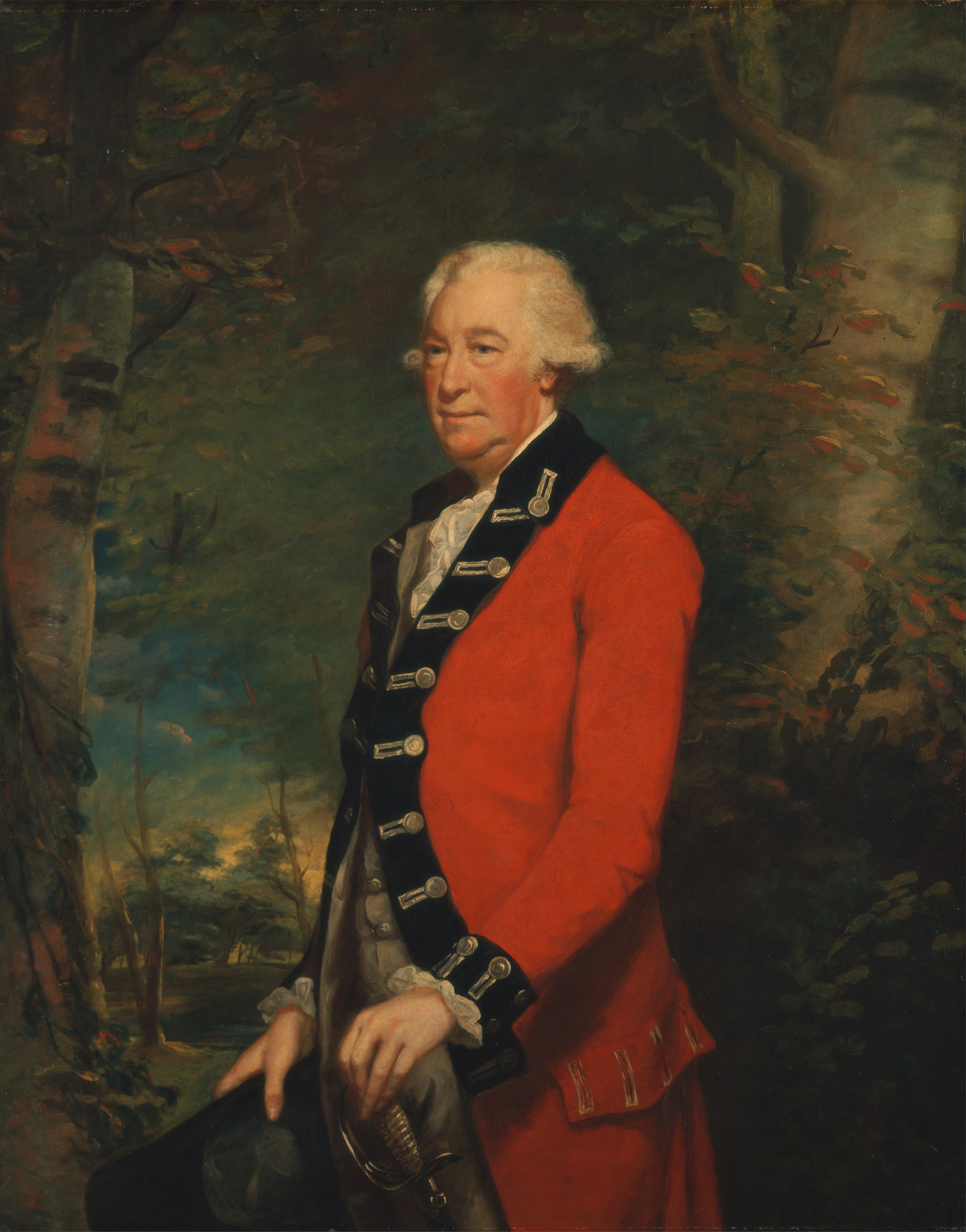
- Portrait of Sir Ralph Milbanke by James Northcote, 1784
- Born: 1721; England
- Died: 8 January 1798 (aged 76–77)
- Children: 3, including Ralph and Elizabeth
- Parent(s): Sir Ralph Milbanke, 4th Baronet; Lady Milbanke

Colonel Sir Ralph Milbanke (1721 – 8 January 1798) was a British politician and militia officer who represented Scarborough in the House of Commons of Great Britain from 1754 to 1761 and Richmond from 1761 to 1768.

== Life ==
Milbanke was born in 1721 into an aristocratic landed Yorkshire family. His father was Sir Ralph Milbanke, 4th Baronet of Halnaby in the County of York who had served as High Sheriff of Yorkshire in 1721. Milbanke himself served as High Sheriff of the same county for 1753–54.

In January 1759 during the Seven Years' War he was appointed colonel of the reformed Richmondshire Battalion, North York Militia. When the militia was called out again in 1778 during the American War of Independence, while the country was threatened with invasion by France and Spain, he was colonel of the North York Militia. Milbanke died on 8 January 1798.

== Family ==
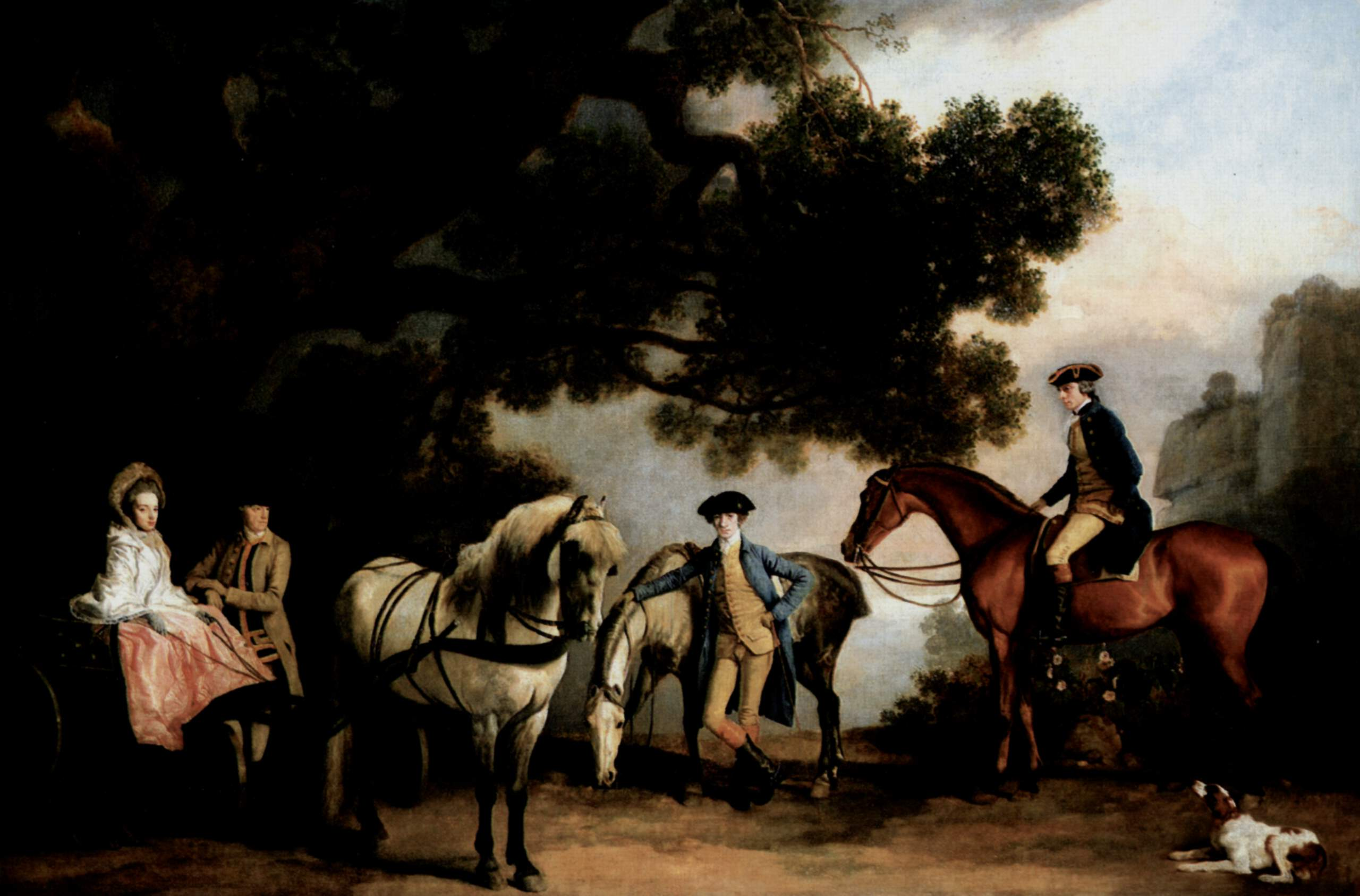
The Milbanke and Melbourne Families by George Stubbs, 1769

He married Elizabeth Hedworth in 1748. They had issue:

- Sir Ralph Noel, 6th Bt. (1747-1825)
- John Milbanke
- Elizabeth Milbanke (1751-1818), married Peniston Lamb, 1st Viscount Melbourne in 1769. She was the mother of the future Prime Minister Lord Melbourne and Emily, the wife of Lord Palmerston

Baronetage of England
Preceded by Ralph Milbanke	Baronet (of Halnaby); 1748–1798	Succeeded by Ralph Noel
