= John Kincaid (political scientist) =

American political scientist

John Kincaid is an American political scientist and scholar of American federalism, intergovernmental relations, and state and local government. He is the Robert B. & Helen S. Meyner Professor of Government and Public Service and Director of the Meyner Center for the Study of State and Local Government at Lafayette College in Easton, Pennsylvania. He also is President of CSF Associates: Publius, the sponsor of the Center for the Study of Federalism. He previously taught at North Texas State University, Arizona State University, St. Peter’s College/University, and Seton Hall University. He served as executive director of the U.S. Advisory Commission on Intergovernmental Relations and as vice president of the Pentagon Papers Fund for the Defense of Human and Civil Liberties.

== Education and career ==
Born (1946) and raised in Philadelphia, Pennsylvania, Kincaid graduated from Central High School (221 class) in 1964, received a BA from Temple University in 1967, an MA from the University of Wisconsin–Milwaukee, in 1968, and a Ph.D. from Temple University in 1981 where he studied under political scientists Daniel J. Elazar and Peter Bachrach.

He attended Union Theological Seminary, New York City (1968–69) and also taught part-time at Seton Hall University, South Orange, New Jersey, before becoming instructor and inner-city liaison at St. Peter’s College/University, Jersey City, New Jersey (1969–70). He was director of the Phoenix Peace Center and coordinator for Professional and Business Men and Women for Peace, Phoenix, Arizona (1970–72), during which time he hosted Jane Fonda and Tom Hayden at Arizona State University where he was a faculty associate in sociology. He then served as vice-president and co-treasurer of the Pentagon Papers Fund for the Defense of Human and Civil Liberties, Los Angeles, California (1972–73), in which capacity he also managed the legal-defense office of Daniel Ellsberg and Anthony Russo. He wrote for the Guardian and American Report and edited an issue of WIN Magazine on the Pentagon Papers Trial (November 1, 1972).

Kincaid was assistant and associate professor of political science at North Texas State University (now University of North Texas) (1979–86). He left the university to serve as research director (1986–87) and then executive director (1987–94) of the U.S. Advisory Commission on Intergovernmental Relations, Washington, D.C. In 1994, he took the positions of Robert B. & Helen S. Meyner Professor of Government and Public Service and Director of the Meyner Center for the Study of State and Local Government at Lafayette College in Easton, Pennsylvania.

Kincaid served as associate editor and editor of Publius: The Journal of Federalism (1981-2006) and as guest editor of topical issues of the Annals of the American Academy of Political and Social Science (1988 and 1990), International Political Science Review (1983), L’Europe en formation (2010), and State and Local Government Review (2017).

He also has served as co-editor of the Routledge Book Series on Federalism and Decentralization (2014–present); editor of a book series, “Politics and Governments of the American States,” University of Nebraska Press (1989-2006); and senior editor for A Global Dialogue on Federalism, a joint program of the Forum of Federations and International Association of Centers for Federal Studies (2001–13).

Kincaid is married to Lucille DeMasi Kincaid, a pianist, retired high-school music teacher, a host of WDIY Classics (Lehigh Valley Public Radio), WDIY Music Librarian, and music director of many shows in the Lehigh Valley metropolitan area.

== Congressional testimony ==
John Kincaid has testified before the U.S. Congress on the “Lobbying with Appropriated Funds Reform Act of 2000,” “Tenth Amendment Enforcement Act of 1996,” and “Restore the Partnership Act,” 2018.

== Awards and honors ==
- Distinguished Scholar Award, 2016, RC28: Comparative Federalism and Multilevel Governance, International Political Science Association
- Daniel J. Elazar Distinguished Scholar Award, 2001, Section on Federalism and Intergovernmental Relations, American Political Science Association
- President: International Association of Centers for Federal Studies, 1998-2004
- Best Paper Award, Annual Meeting of the Urban Affairs Association, Fort Worth, TX, 1998
- Kestnbaum Fellow, U.S. Advisory Commission on Intergovernmental Relations, 1994-95
- President: Southwestern Political Science Association, 1993-94
- Elected Fellow, National Academy of Public Administration, 1991–Present
- Donald Stone Distinguished Scholar Award, Section on Intergovernmental Administration and Management, American Society for Public Administration, 1991
- Outstanding Paper Award, Annual Meeting of the Southwestern Political Science Association, Houston, TX, 1980
- In 2015, the Section on Federalism and Intergovernmental Relations of the American Political Science Association established The John Kincaid Award for Best Article Published in Publius: The Journal of Federalism each year.

== Bibliography ==
- “Constitutional Values and Citizen Attitudes to Government: Explaining Federal System Viability and Reform Preferences in Eight Countries,” Publius: The Journal of Federalism 52:1 (Winter 2022): 1-25 (with A J Brown and Jacob Deem).
- “Partisan Fractures in U.S. Federalism’s COVID-19 Policy Responses,” State and Local Government Review 52:4 (2020): 298-308 (with J. Wesley Leckrone).
- A Research Agenda for Federalism Studies (editor). Edward Elgar 2019.
- “Dynamic De/Centralization in the United States, 1790-2010,” Publius: The Journal of Federalism 49:1 (Winter 2019): 166-193.
- Identities, Trust, and Cohesion in Federal Systems: Public Perspectives (editor with Jack Jedwab). McGill-Queen’s University Press, 2018.
- Courts in Countries: Federalists or Unitarists? (editor with Nicholas Aroney). University of Toronto Press, 2017.
- “The Eclipse of Dual Federalism by One-Way Cooperative Federalism,” Arizona State Law Journal 49: 3 (Fall 2017): 1061-89.
- “Introduction: The Trump Interlude and the States of American Federalism,” State and Local Government Review 49:3 (September 2017): 156-69.
- “Territorial Neutrality and Cultural Pluralism in American Federalism: Is the United States the Archenemy of Peripheral Nationalism?” Swiss Political Science Review 22:4 (December 2016): 565–84.
- “Citizen Evaluations of Federalism and the Importance of Trust in the Federation Government for Opinions on Regional Equity and Subordination in Four Countries,” Publius: The Journal of Federalism 46:1 (2016): 51-76 (with Richard L. Cole).
- “Federalism and Rights: The Case of the United States with Comparative Perspectives,” Human Rights: Current Issues and Controversies, ed. Gordon DiGiacomo Toronto: University of Toronto Press, 2016, pp. 83–113.
- “The Federalist and V. Ostrom on Concurrent Taxation and Federalism,” Publius: The Journal of Federalism 44:2 (Spring 2014): 275-97.
- “The U.S. Advisory Commission on Intergovernmental Relations: Unique Artifact of a Bygone Era,” Public Administration Review 71 (March/April 2011): 181-89.
- Federalism. London: Sage, 2011, 4 Volumes, (editor).
- Constitutional Origins, Structure, and Change in Federal Countries. (editor with G. Alan Tarr). McGill-Queen’s University Press, 2005.
- The Covenant Connection: From Federal Theology to Modern Federalism (editor with Daniel J. Elazar). Lexington Books, 2000.
- “De Facto Devolution and Urban Defunding: The Priority of Persons Over Places,” Journal of Urban Affairs 21:2 (Summer 1999): 135-67.
- “Confederal Federalism and Citizen Representation in the European Union,” West European Politics 22:2 (April 1999): 34-58.
- “The International Competence of US States and Their Local Governments,” Regional & Federal Studies 9:1 (Spring 1999): 111-30.
- “Values and Value Tradeoffs in Federalism,” Publius: The Journal of Federalism 25 (Spring 1995): 29-44.
- Competition among States and Local Governments: Efficiency and Equity in American Federalism. (editor with Daphne A. Kenyon). Urban Institute Press, 1991.
- “From Cooperative to Coercive Federalism,” Annals of the American Academy of Political and Social Science 509 (May 1990): 139-52.
- “Personality and Public Opinion: The Case of Authoritarianism, Prejudice, and Support for the Korean and Vietnam Wars,” Polity 11 (Fall 1978): 92-113 (with Frederick D. Herzon and Verne Dalton).
