= Ralph Noel =

British politician

Member of Parliament for County Durham
- In office 1790-1812

Personal details
- Born: Ralph Milbanke; 28 July 1747
- Died: 19 March 1825 (aged 77)
- Party: Foxite Whig
- Spouse: Judith Noel (m. 1777; died 1822)
- Children: Anne Isabella Milbanke
- Parent: Ralph Milbanke (father)
- Relatives: Lady Melbourne (sister); Ada Lovelace (granddaughter); John Hedworth (grandfather)

Sir Ralph Noel, 6th Baronet (28 July 1747 – 19 March 1825) was a British landowner and politician, father-in-law of Lord Byron and grandfather of the mathematician Lady Ada Lovelace. Before 1815 he was known as Sir Ralph Milbanke.

== Biography ==
He was the eldest son of Sir Ralph Milbanke, 5th Baronet, and his wife Elizabeth, daughter of John Hedworth. His uncle John Milbanke was married to a sister of the Whig leader Lord Rockingham, and his sister was the political hostess Lady Melbourne. On 9 January 1777 he married Judith Noel, daughter of Lord Wentworth; they had one daughter, Anne Isabella. Milbanke succeeded his father as sixth baronet on 8 January 1798. The family lived at Seaham Hall, County Durham, but also owned property in Northumberland and Yorkshire.

Milbanke was elected Member of Parliament for County Durham at the 1790 general election. A Foxite Whig, he supported abolition of the slave trade and Catholic emancipation. By 1812, worsening health and declining finances obliged him to retire from the Commons. Milbanke's wife Judith succeeded to the Leicestershire estates of her brother Thomas in 1815 and on 29 May that year Milbanke adopted the surname of Noel by royal licence. He was succeeded in the baronetcy by his nephew John Penistone Milbanke. Lady Noel had died in 1822, and in 1856 their daughter Lady Byron succeeded as 11th Baroness Wentworth.

Sir Ralph was admitted as a joining member of the Sea Captain's Lodge, Sunderland (later to become Palatine Lodge No.97) on the 14th February 1793 and became Provincial Grand Master of the Province of Durham in 1799.

Baronetage of England
Preceded by Ralph Milbanke	Baronet (of Halnaby); 1793–1825	Succeeded by John Peniston Milbanke
