= Pennyman baronets =

Extinct baronetcy in the Baronetage of England

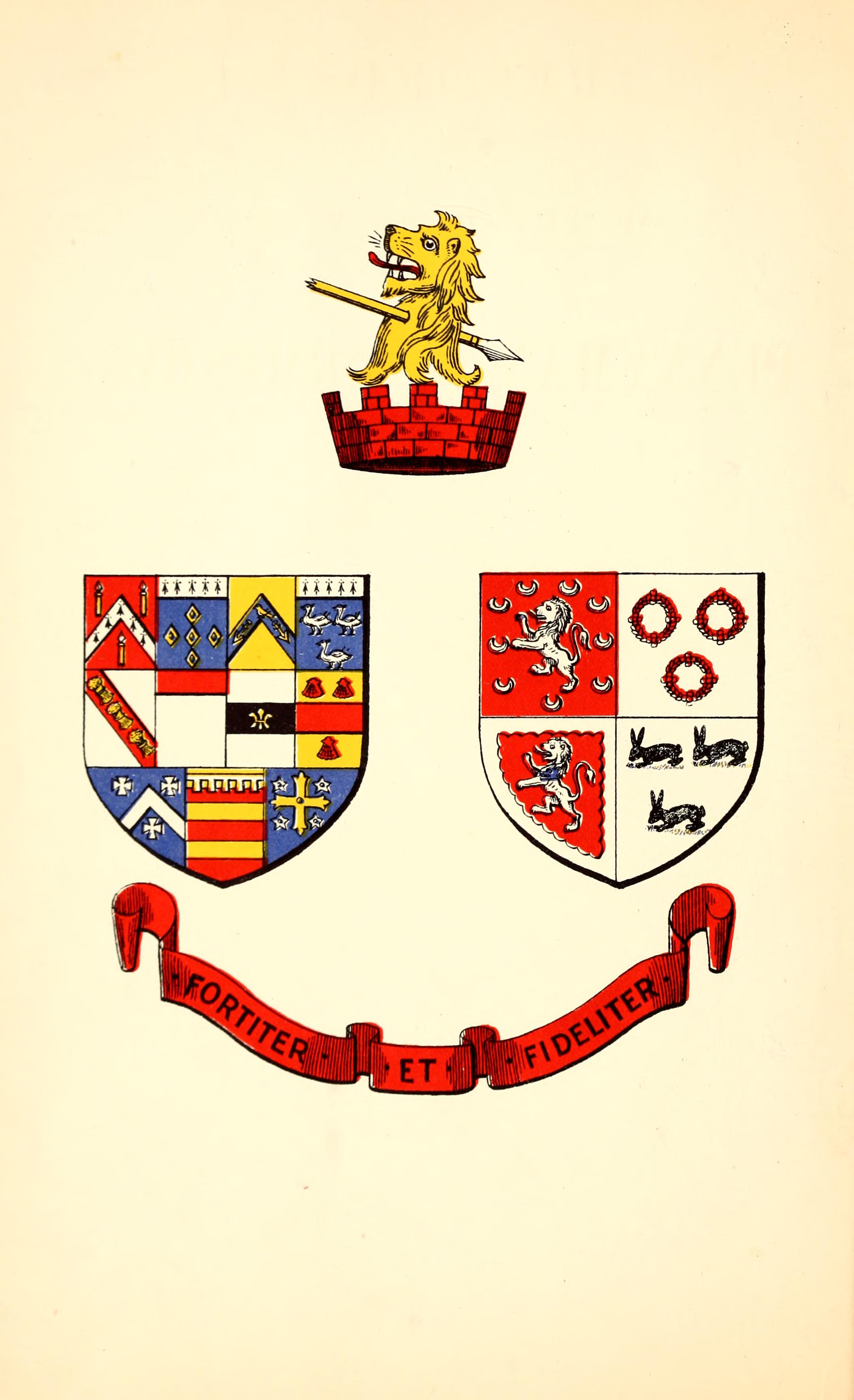
Achievement of the family of Pennyman of Ormesby (1904)

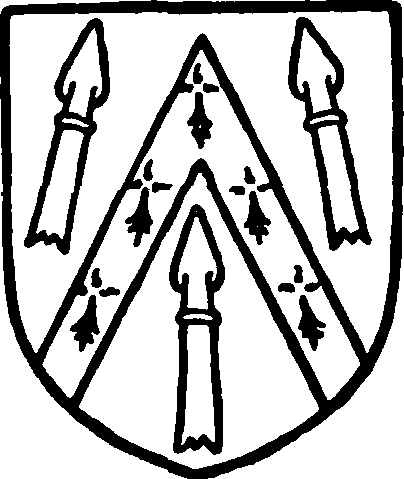
Pennyman of Ormesby: Gules a cheveron ermine between three broken spears or with their heads argent (1599)

Pennyman baronets are holders of one of two baronetcies created for members of the Pennyman family.

== Overview ==
The Baronetcy of Pennyman of Marske was created in the Baronetage of England by Charles I on 6 May 1628 for William Pennyman of Marske Hall, Marske-by-the-Sea, North Yorkshire, a Master in Chancery. It was extinct on his death in 1643.

The Baronetcy of Pennyman of Ormesby was created in the Baronetage of England by Charles II on 22 February 1664 for James Pennyman of Ormesby Hall, near Middlesbrough, in North Yorkshire.

The Pennyman family, originally from Stokesley, North Yorkshire, began to establish their estates at Ormesby in the 16th century. They were Jacobite sympathisers; Robert Pennyman was convicted of treason and executed in 1569 for his part in the Pilgrimage of Grace. They were staunch Royalists in the 17th century. William Pennyman who was created the 1st Baronet in 1628 fought for the King at the Battle of Edgehill. His elder legitimate half brother James Pennyman was raised to the Baronetage after the Restoration of Charles II.

In 1703 there was a marriage reported of Sir? Thomas Pennyman to Lady Margaret Pennyman that only lasted three months.

== Pennyman of Marske (1628) ==
- Sir William Pennyman, 1st Baronet (c. 1607–1643) Extinct on his death

== Pennyman of Ormesby (1664) ==
- Sir James Pennyman, 1st Baronet (1608–1679)
- Sir Thomas Pennyman, 2nd Baronet (1642–1708). High Sheriff of Yorkshire 1702
- Sir James Pennyman, 3rd Baronet (c. 1661–1745)
- Sir William Pennyman, 4th Baronet (1695–1768). High Sheriff of Yorkshire 1750
- Sir Warton Pennyman-Warton, 5th Baronet (1701–1770)
- Sir James Pennyman, 6th Baronet (1736–1808). Member of Parliament for Scarborough 1770–74 and Beverley 1774–1796, married Elizabeth Grey, daughter of Sir Henry Grey, 1st Baronet of Howick, Northumberland
- Sir William Henry Pennyman, 7th Baronet (1764–1852) Extinct on his death

== See also ==
- John Pennyman
