= Milbanke baronets =

Extinct baronetcy in the Baronetage of England

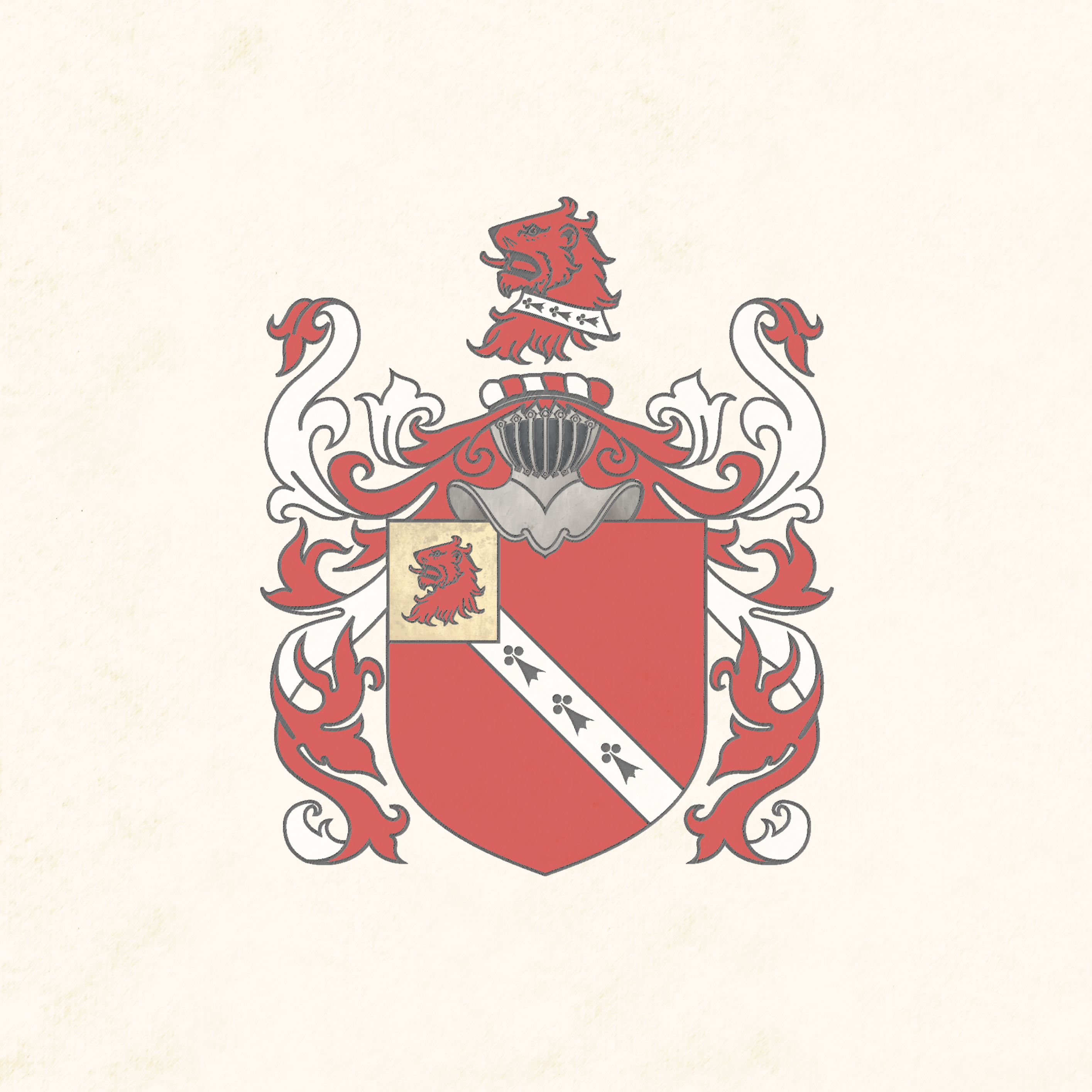
- Crest: A lion's head erased Gules charged with a bend Ermine.
- Shield: Gules a bend Ermine on a canton Or a lion's head erased of the first.
- Motto: Resolute And Firm

The Milbanke, later Noel, later Milbanke Baronetcy, of Halnaby in the County of York, was a title in the Baronetage of England. It was created on 7 August 1661 for Mark Milbanke. His father was Mark Milbanke of Chirton, Northumberland (died 1677) a Newcastle on Tyne merchant and hostman who was Sheriff of the city in 1638, and Mayor in 1658 and 1672, and whose marriage brought him an estate at Halnaby, near Darlington, North Yorkshire. The second Baronet was High Sheriff of Northumberland in 1678. The third Baronet was High Sheriff of Northumberland 1685 and Member of Parliament for Richmond. The fifth Baronet was Member of Parliament for Scarborough and Richmond. The sixth Baronet sat as Member of Parliament for County Durham. He married Judith Noel and changed his surname in 1815, but he died leaving only a daughter, Annabella, who married the poet Lord Byron, and so he was succeeded by his nephew. The tenth Baronet was awarded the Victoria Cross. The title became extinct on the death of the twelfth Baronet in 1949.

Halnaby Hall was demolished in 1952 following the death of the twelfth and last Baronet.

== Milbanke baronets, of Halnaby (1661) ==
- Sir Mark Milbanke, 1st Baronet (died 1680)
- Sir Mark Milbanke, 2nd Baronet (1660–1698)
- Sir Mark Milbanke, 3rd Baronet (died 1705)
- Sir Ralph Milbanke, 4th Baronet (died 1748)
- Sir Ralph Milbanke, 5th Baronet (died 1793)
- Sir Ralph Noel, 6th Baronet (died 1825)
- Sir John Peniston Milbanke, 7th Baronet (1776–1850)
- Sir John Ralph Milbanke Huskisson, 8th Baronet (1800–1868)
- Sir Peniston Milbanke, 9th Baronet (1847–1899)
- Sir John Peniston Milbanke, 10th Baronet (1872–1915)
- Sir John Charles Peniston Milbanke, 11th Baronet (1902–1947)
- Sir Ralph Mark Milbanke, 12th Baronet (1907–1949)

== Gallery ==
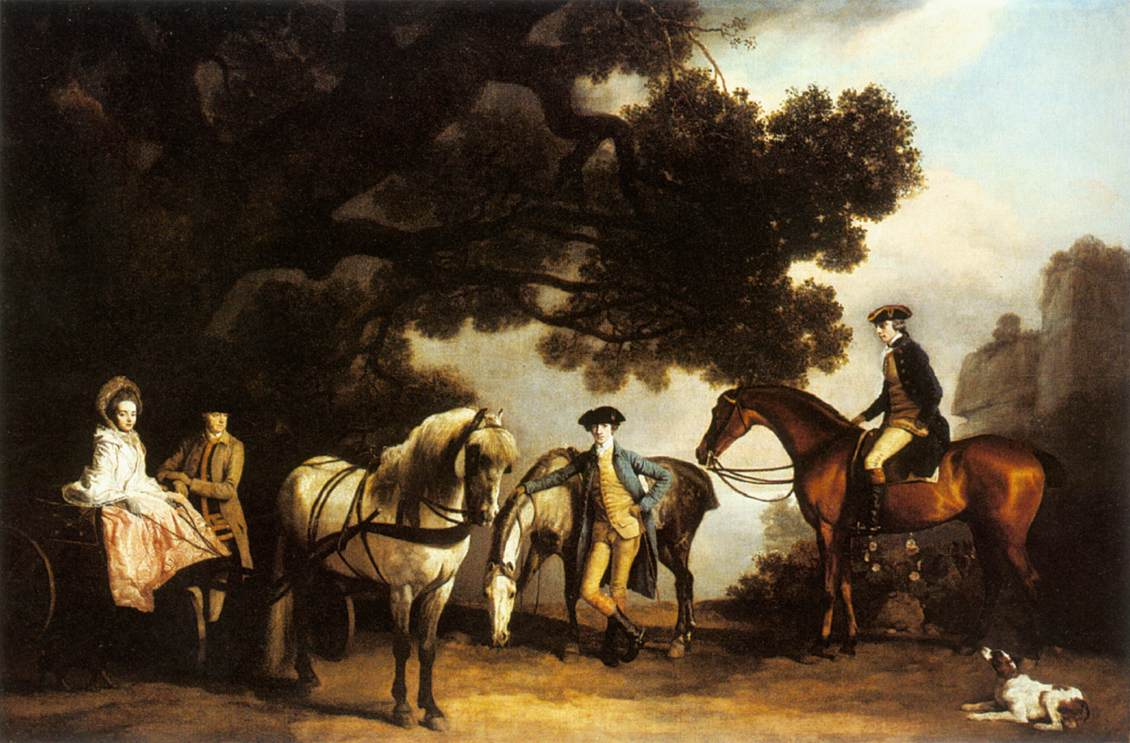
The Milbanke and Melbourne Families by George Stubbs, 1769

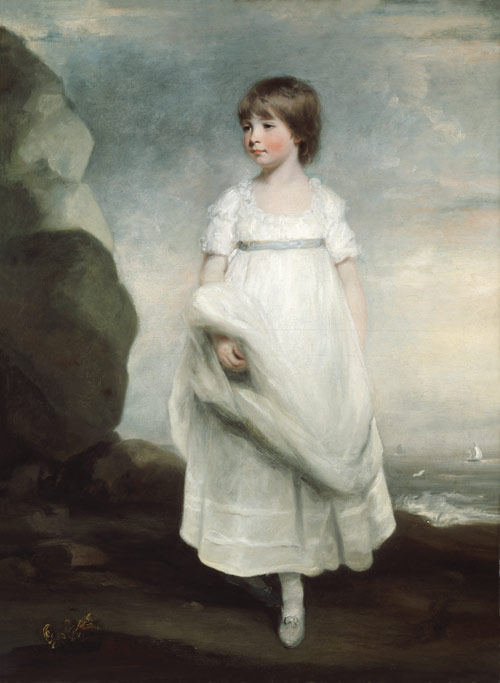
Anne Isabella Milbanke

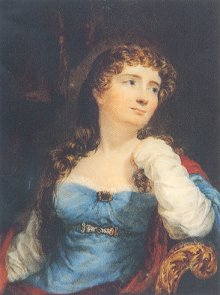
Anabella Milbanke

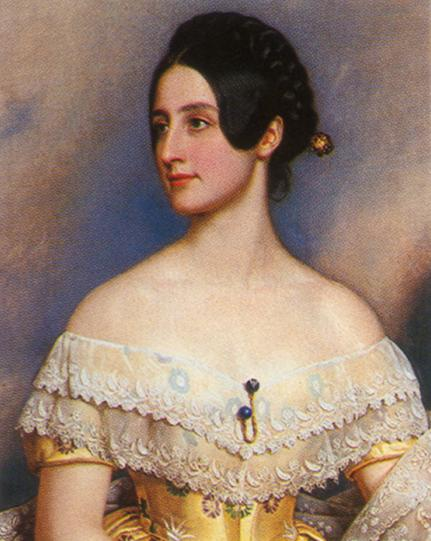
Lady Emily Milbanke

== See also ==
- Milbank baronets
