= John Kincaid (British Army officer) =

Scottish army officer

Sir John Kincaid (1787 – 1862) was an officer of the British 95th Regiment, The Rifle Brigade who wrote a first hand account of his service under Wellington through the Peninsula War and the Battle of Waterloo.

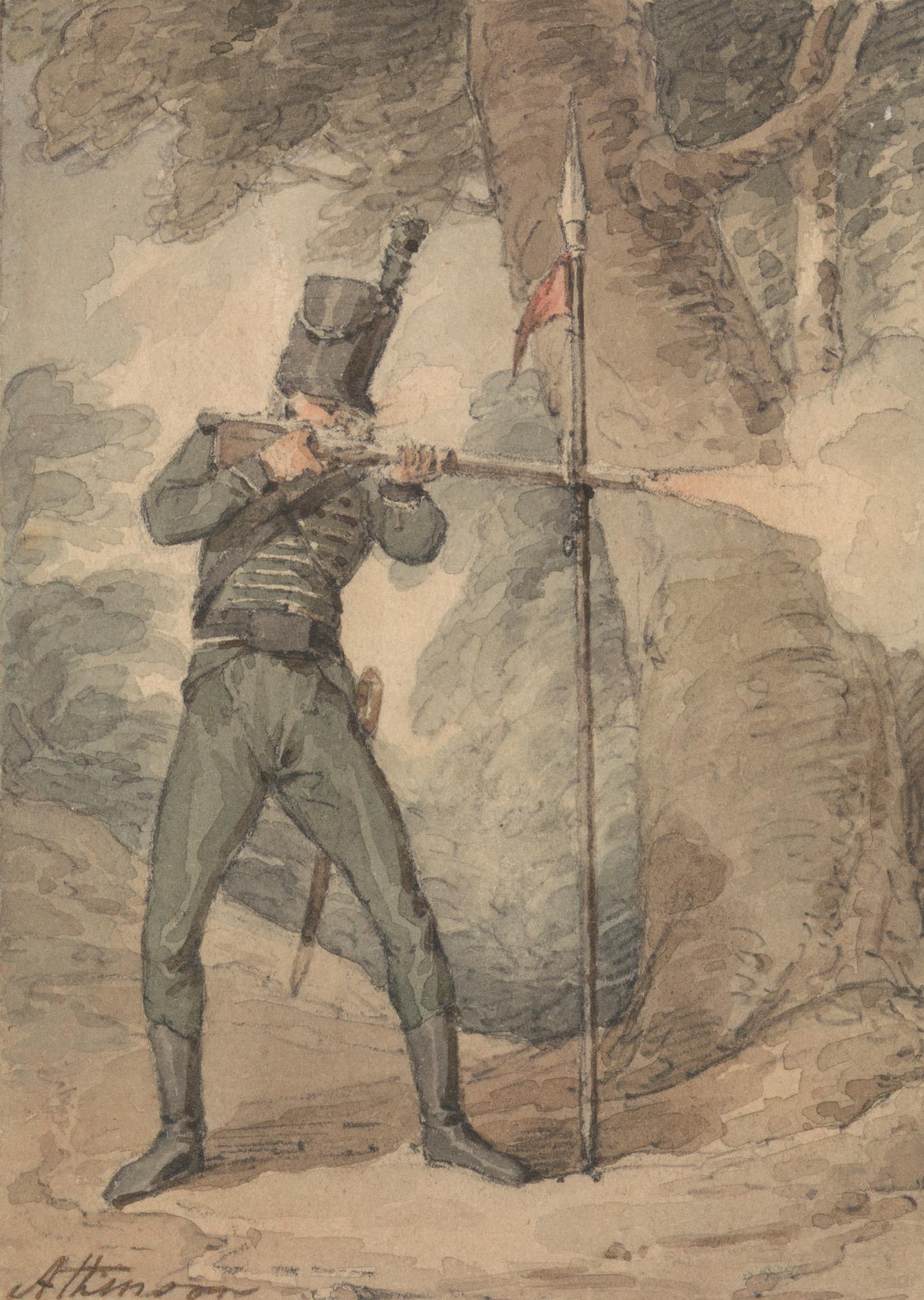
A British Rifleman of the Napoleonic Era

== Life ==
Born the second son of John Kincaid of Dalheath, near Falkirk, John Kincaid was educated at Polmont School and served for a time in the North York Militia. He joined the second battalion Rifle Brigade (then still the 95th) as a second Lieutenant in 1809.

Kincaid recounted the events of his life from 1809 to 1815 in Adventures in the Rifle Brigade. He first saw action in the Walcheren Expedition in 1809 before returning to England. The regiment then sailed to Spain in 1810 to join the Duke of Wellington's Army. Kincaid related his own experience of the Peninsula Campaign, the advance into France and finally the Battles of Quatre Bras and Waterloo in his memoir. His account is thought to be one of the principal sources for Bernard Cornwall's fictional Sharpe of the Rifles.

Kincaid became a captain in 1826, retired from the Army in 1831 and was knighted in 1852 as senior Exon of the Yeomen of the Guard.

== Works ==
- Adventures in the Rifle Brigade (London 1830)
- Random Shots of a Rifleman (London 1835)
