= Westlake =

Westlake may refer to:

== Places ==
=== Australia ===
- Westlake, Australian Capital Territory, a former settlement/suburb of Canberra
- Westlake, Queensland, a suburb of Brisbane

=== Canada ===
- Westlake, Alberta, an unincorporated urban community

=== New Zealand ===
- Westlake, New Zealand, a suburb of Auckland
  - Westlake Girls High School
  - Westlake Boys High School

=== United States ===
- Westlake, Daly City, California
- Westlake, Los Angeles, California
- Westlake, California, a master-planned community which now comprises:
  - The entirety of Westlake Village, California
  - A neighborhood in Thousand Oaks, California
- Westlake, Florida
- Westlake, Georgia
- Westlake, Louisiana
- Westlake, Ohio
- Westlake, Oregon
- Westlake, Texas
- Several locations in Seattle, Washington:
  - Westlake Center, a shopping center located downtown
  - Westlake station (Sound Transit), a downtown metro station near the shopping center
  - Westlake Park (Seattle), a public plaza across from Westlake Center
  - Westlake, Seattle, a neighborhood
  - Westlake Avenue, a major street connecting several neighborhoods to downtown
  - Westlake Square, a smaller park near Westlake Park
- Westlake, Washington, a former town in Grant County that was annexed by Moses Lake in 1972
- Westlake Corner, Virginia
- Westlake High School (disambiguation)
- West Lake Hills, Texas

== People ==
- Brian Westlake (1943–2026), English footballer
- Clive Westlake (1932–2000), British songwriter
- Dave Westlake (born 1970), British musician
- David Westlake (born 1965), British singer/songwriter
- Dean Westlake (1960–2022), American politician
- Donald E. Westlake (1933–2008), American author
- H. D. Westlake (1906–1992), British classical scholar; see Hellenica Oxyrhynchia
- John Westlake (law scholar) (1828–1913), English writer on international law
- Martin Westlake (born 1957), British and Belgian author, musician, and EU civil servant
- Nathaniel Westlake (1833–1921), British artist specialising in stained glass
- Nigel Westlake (born 1958), Australian composer
- Philip Westlake, British painter and brother of Nathaniel

== Train stations ==
- Westlake (Link station), a light rail and bus station in Seattle
- Westlake / MacArthur Park (LACMTA station), a Red Line and Purple Line subway station in Los Angeles
- Westlake Station (disambiguation), stations of the name

== Other ==
- Westlake (album), a 1987 album by David Westlake
- Westlake Chemical
- Westlake Entertainment, a DVD distributor; see Keystone Studios § Legacy
- Westlake Recording Studios, in West Hollywood, California
- Westlake Tyres, a brand of automotive tyres owned by Hangzhou Zhongce Rubber Company

== See also ==
- West Lake (disambiguation)
- West Lakes (disambiguation)
