= West Lake (disambiguation) =

West Lake is a freshwater lake in Hangzhou, China.

West Lake may also refer to:

== Place names ==
=== Canada ===
- West Lake, Ontario, a community
  - West Lake, a bay of Lake Ontario, and the location of the community

=== China ===
- Slender West Lake in Yangzhou, Jiangsu
- West Lake (Beijing), better known as Kunming Lake, in the Summer Palace, Beijing
- West Lake (Chaozhou), in Chaozhou, Guangdong
- West Lake (Eryuan), in Eryuan County, Yunnan
- West Lake, in Fuzhou, Fujian
- West Lake (Huizhou), in Huizhou, Guangdong
- West Lake, in Quanzhou, Fujian
- West Lake Restaurant, in Changsha, Hunan

=== Japan ===
- Saiko Lake ("West Lake"), in Yamanashi Prefecture

=== United States of America ===
- West Lake Hills, Texas
- West Lake Landfill, Bridgeton, Missouri
- West Lake (New York), a lake in Fulton County, New York
- West Lake (Herkimer County, New York), a lake
- West Lake Sammamish, Washington, a community
- West Lake Stevens, Washington, a community
- West Lake Junior High, West Valley City, Utah

=== Vietnam ===
- West Lake (Hanoi), the largest lake in Hanoi

== Transit locations ==
- West Lake station (MARTA), a passenger rail station in Atlanta, Georgia, United States
- Monon Corridor, also called the West Lake Corridor during project planning and construction, a commuter rail line from Hammond to Munster, Indiana, United States
- West Lake Station (disambiguation), stations of the name

== See also ==
- West Lakes (disambiguation)
- Westlake (disambiguation)
