= Bernard Partridge =

English illustrator (1861–1945)

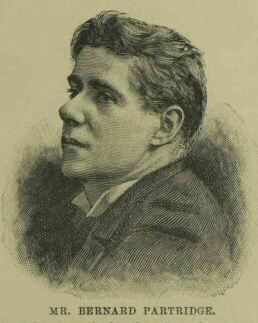
Bernard Partridge

Bernard Partridge's signature, 1916

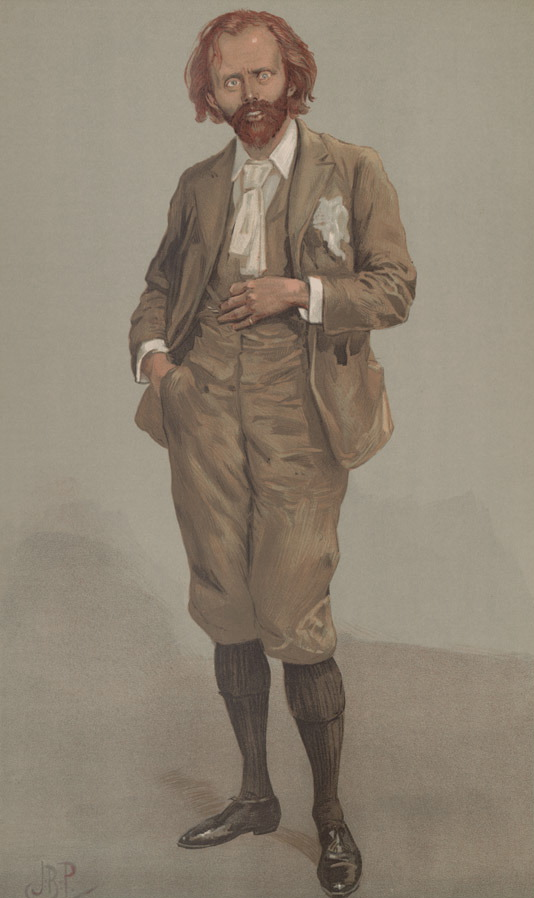
Caricature of Hall Caine signed JBP in Vanity Fair, 1896.

Sir John Bernard Partridge (11 October 1861– 9 August 1945) was an English illustrator. Born in London, he was the son of Professor Richard Partridge, F.R.S., president of the Royal College of Surgeons, and nephew of John Partridge, portrait-painter extraordinary to Queen Victoria. For some years he was well known as an actor under the name of Bernard Gould.

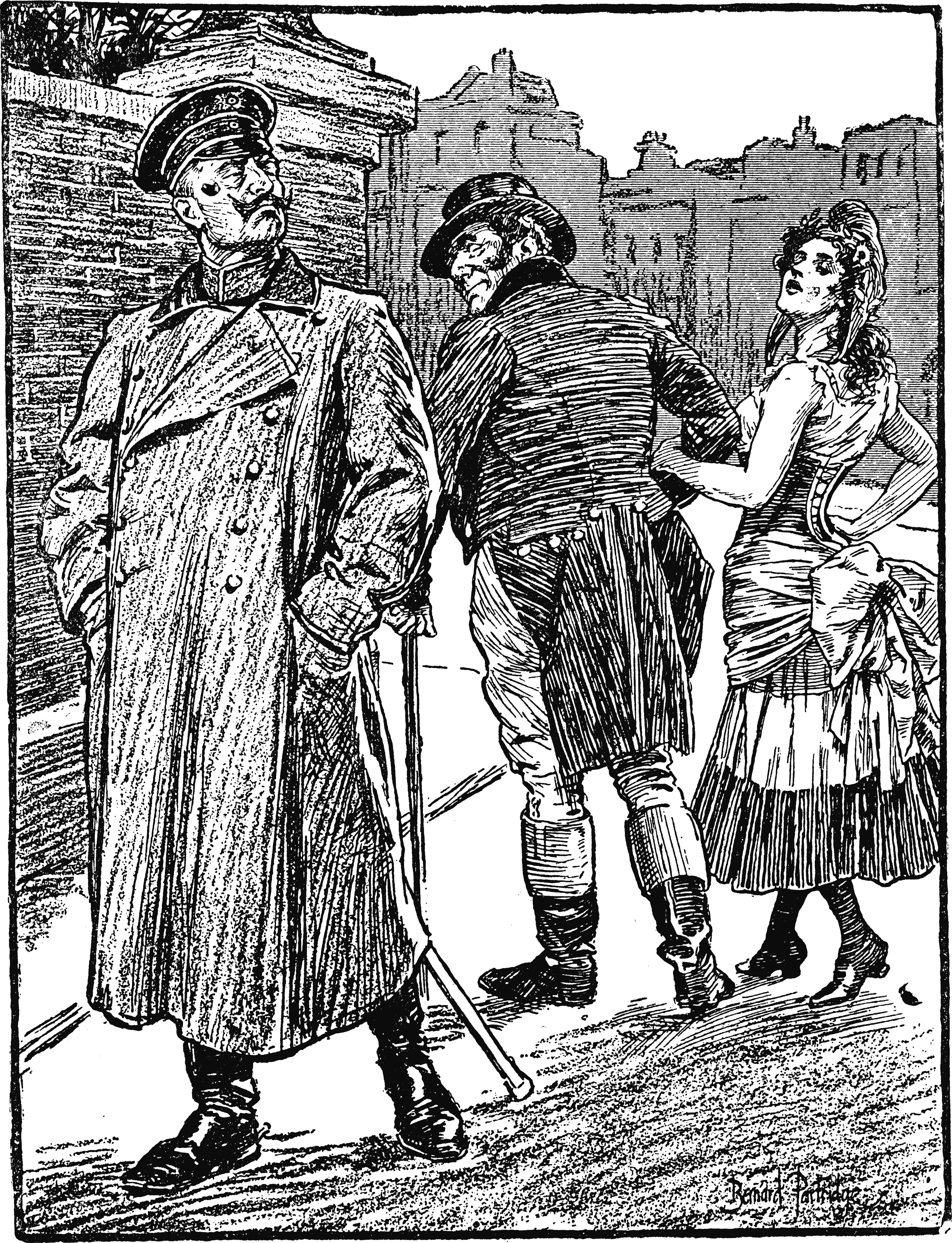
The 1904 cartoon on the Entente Cordiale by John Bernard Partridge; John Bull stalks off with a defiant Marianne and turns his back on the Kaiser, who pretends not to care.

== Education ==
Partridge was educated at Stonyhurst College where one of his fellow pupils was Arthur Conan Doyle.

== Life and work ==
Partridge then worked for six months in the offices of architect H. Handsom, before joining the firm of Lavers, Barraud and Westlake, ecclesiastical designers, where he spent two years producing altar-pieces, stained-glass etc. He then studied decorative painting under Philip Westlake, 1880–1884. He began illustrating for the press and practised watercolour painting, but his chief success was derived from book illustration.

Partridge was very interested in the theatre and acted under the stage name Bernard Gould. He appeared in the first production of George Bernard Shaw's Arms and the Man. Many of his early drawings were of stage subjects or personalities, and some of his finest caricatures in later life were drawn from the world of the stage.

In 1891 Partridge joined the staff of Punch and, in 1909, became its chief cartoonist, replacing Edward Linley Sambourne. During his time at Punch, Partridge published several cartoons supporting the Suffragist movement.d He was elected a member of the Royal Institute of Painters in Water Colours and of The Pastel Society.

A diploma designed by Partridge was presented to medal winners of the 1908 Summer Olympic Games in London.

Partridge was a frequent exhibitor, (Note: Partridge exhibited as follows: 112 works at the Fine Art Society, three works at the Glasgow Institute of the Fine Arts, 12 works at the Walker Art Gallery, Liverpool, 44 works at the Leicester Galleries, two works at the New English Art Club, 18 works at the Royal Academy, and three works at the Royal Institute of Painters in Water Colours.) exhibiting nearly 200 works in total.

In 1897 Partridge married Lydia Faith Harvey (1873–1961) of Finsbury Park. Lady Partridge maintained relationships with others in the art world before and after her husband's death. These included Sir Hugh Lane and Margaret E. Wilson. She died childless.

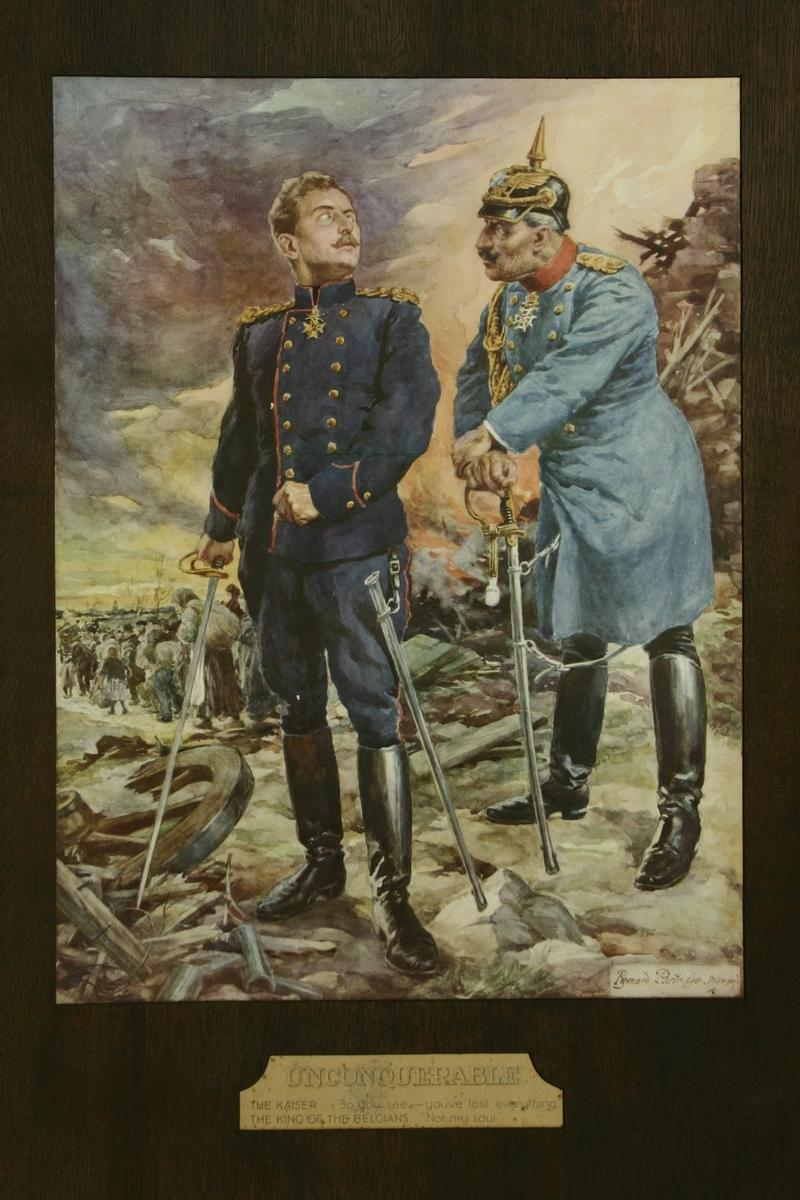
Unconquerable

Partridge was still producing work for Punch until three months before his death, so readers of Punch had been viewing his cartoons for over fifty years.

== World War I works ==
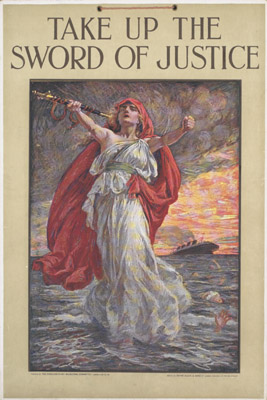
Take Up The Sword Of Justice

1915 Partridge designed posters to encourage recruitment to the British Army. Take up the Sword of Justice was one of the most popular, printed by David Allen & Sons, for the British Parliamentary Recruiting Committee (PRC). It features the sinking RMS Lusitania, drowning passengers, and a vengeful Lady Justice wielding the Sword of Justice. State Library of Victoria, Melbourne, Australia, is just one of the many libraries and museums around the world which hold copies of this poster.

Another work from this time that was well known to the populace was Unconquerable. It features Wilhelm II, German Emperor, and Albert I, the King of the Belgians. The cartoon was published by Punch in October 1914. This original was presented to the Queen of the Belgians by the Gardeners' Company, the purchase money going to the Belgian Relief Fund. In 1917 copies of the poster, styled "the Greatest War Picture ...... in magnificent colour reproduction", which Partridge based on his original cartoon were sent by Punch to new subscribers as part of a promotion. In 1919 Punch sent complimentary copies of this poster to public libraries and Schools of Arts across Australia and New Zealand, many of which were framed and placed in their reading rooms.

Persons who served overseas with Expeditionary Forces in an active war zone, and were disabled, received a King's Certificate of Discharge stating that they "Served with honour". The certificate was designed by Partridge in 1916, at the request of the War Office.

At this time he also designed postcards for Blue Cross Quarantine Kennels, for soldiers bringing home their pet dogs.

Partridge was the twentieth of twenty illustrators selected by Percy V. Bradshaw for inclusion in his series The Art of the Illustrator (1917–1918) which presented a separate portfolio for each illustrator. (Note: The portfolio contained: a brief biography of Partridge, an illustration of Partridge at work in his studio, an explanation of Partridge's method of working. This was accompanied by a plate showing an illustration typical of his work and five other plates showing the work at five earlier stages of its production, from the first rough to the just before the finished drawing or colour sketch. Partridge's pen and ink drawing shows what appears to be a German cavalry man with a ragged, blindfolded woman riding pillion on a mountain road. It was reproduced by permission of Punch and was probably a political reference to the First World War. The extraneous sketches in the preparatory work suggest that this was from his sketch-book, rather than being specially prepared.)

== World War II works ==
One of his most famous cartoons of this war was Salute to Malta. In it St. George, wearing the Maltese Cross, defends the stronghold of Malta against the dragon.

== Knight Bachelor ==
Partridge was appointed a Knight Bachelor in the 1925 Birthday Honours on the advice of Prime Minister Stanley Baldwin and gave his support to the government during the General Strike.
