= Richard Partridge =

British surgeon

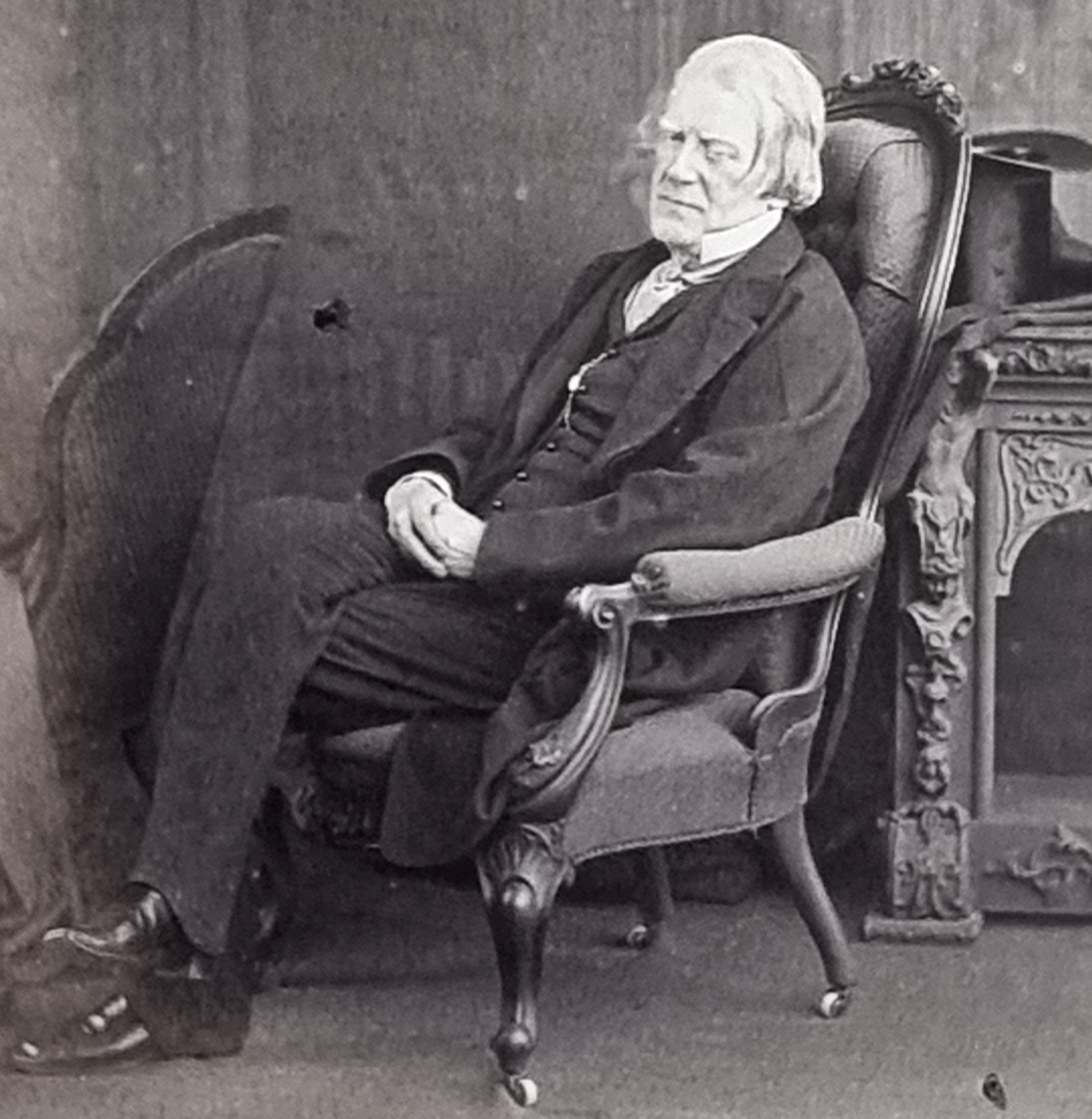
- Richard Partridge, c. 1863
- Born: Richard Patridge; 19 January 1805; Ross-on-Wye, Herefordshire
- Died: 25 March 1873 (aged 68); London
- Other names: Brent of Bin Bin, An Old Bachelor, Vernacular, Ogniblat, Mr and Mrs Ogniblat L'Artsau
- Education: St Bartholomew's Hospital, London
- Occupation: Surgeon
- Employer: Royal College of Surgeons
- Known for: British surgeon,
- Title: FRS, FRCS
- Spouse: Frances Janette Turner

Richard Partridge FRS, FRCS (19 January 1805, in Ross-on-Wye, Herefordshire – 25 March 1873, in London) was a British surgeon. Although he became President of both the Royal College of Surgeons and the Royal Medical and Chirurgical Society, he is best known for his part in apprehending the London Burkers gang and for failing to spot a bullet lodged in Giuseppe Garibaldi's leg.

He was the tenth child and youngest son of twelve children of Samuel Partridge, a Glaswegian merchant who moved to Ross-on-Wye in his retirement. His eldest brother was the portrait painter, John Partridge.

== Education and career ==
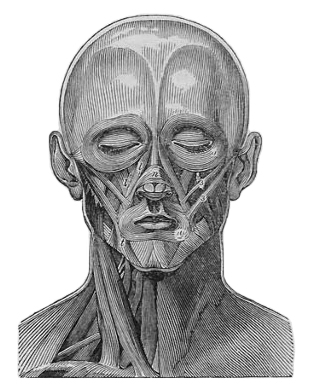
The muscles of the face. From an article by Partridge in Bentley's Cyclopaedia (1839)

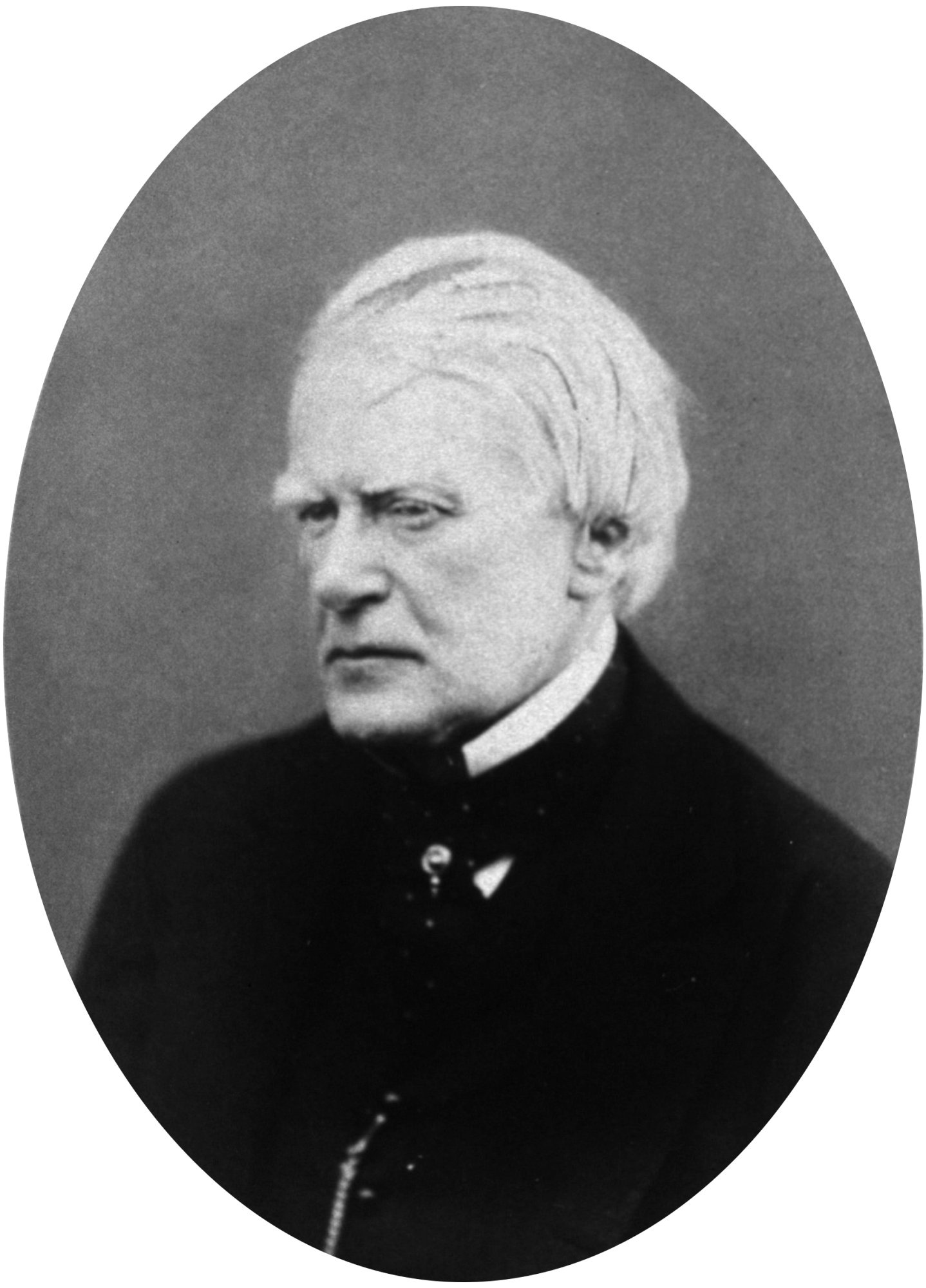
Richard Partridge in 1873

Partridge was apprenticed to his uncle, W.H. Partridge, in Birmingham in 1821, where he acted as dresser to the well-known surgeon Joseph Hodgson, who was later another President of the Royal College of Surgeons. He studied at St Bartholomew's Hospital in London from 1827, attending lectures by John Abernethy. The same year, he became a member of the Royal College of Surgeons and a licentiate of the Society of Apothecaries.

His early positions included demonstrator of anatomy at the Windmill Street School of Medicine, demonstrator of anatomy (1831–36) and professor of descriptive and surgical anatomy at King's College (from 1836), and assistant and full surgeon at Charing Cross Hospital (1836–40). In 1840, he was appointed surgeon at the newly established King's College Hospital, a position he held until 1870. From 1853, he also held the position of professor of anatomy at the Royal Academy.

Partridge was appointed a Fellow of the Royal Society in 1837. He was one of the three hundred original fellows of the Royal College of Surgeons, serving as vice-president in 1865 and president in 1866. He also served as vice-president (1847–48) and president (1863–64) of the Royal Medical and Chirurgical Society.

== London Burkers ==
Partridge was instrumental in the apprehension of the gang of murderers and body snatchers called the London Burkers, after the Edinburgh murderers Burke and Hare of three years earlier. On 5 November 1831, shortly after he had taken up the position of demonstrator of anatomy at King's College, the four members of the gang attempted to sell him the body of the so-called 'Italian Boy' for nine guineas. Both Partridge and the dissecting-room porter, William Hill, were suspicious of the fresh state of the body, which looked as if it had never been buried, as well as of a cut on its forehead. Partridge is said to have delayed the gang members with the ruse of claiming to lack change for a fifty-pound note, whilst raising the alarm with his superior, Herbert Mayo. All four members of the London Burker gang were arrested while still awaiting payment.

He was present during the autopsy on the boy's body, and gave evidence at the murder trial of the four gang members, stating that the boy's injuries seemed consistent with a blow to the back of the neck. Witnesses had identified the victim as an Italian beggar, Carlo Ferriere, who exhibited white mice in a cage. Three of the gang were found guilty of the murder; before they were hanged, John Bishop and Thomas Williams confessed to drowning the boy in a well after drugging him with laudanum, stating, however, that the victim was actually from Lincolnshire. The third gang member, James May, had his sentence respited to transportation, but died on the way to Australia. The bodies of Bishop and Williams were dissected, the former at King's College London and their remains displayed.

The crime seems to have caught the public interest to an extraordinary degree; a crowd of thirty thousand turned up to watch the hangings, and a play The Italian Boy (featuring the original story of the Italian beggar and his white mice) was later put on at Shoreditch. Partridge's involvement placed him in the public eye at a young age, and the case seems to have made a strong impression on him; he is said to have often included the tale in his lectures. The public outcry about the case put pressure on the government which led to the passing of the Anatomy Act 1832; the act had been presented in 1829, following the Burke and Hare case, but was defeated. By permitting the bodies of paupers unclaimed by relatives to be supplied to medical schools for dissection, the act did away with the trade of the Resurrectionists.

== Consultation on Giuseppe Garibaldi ==
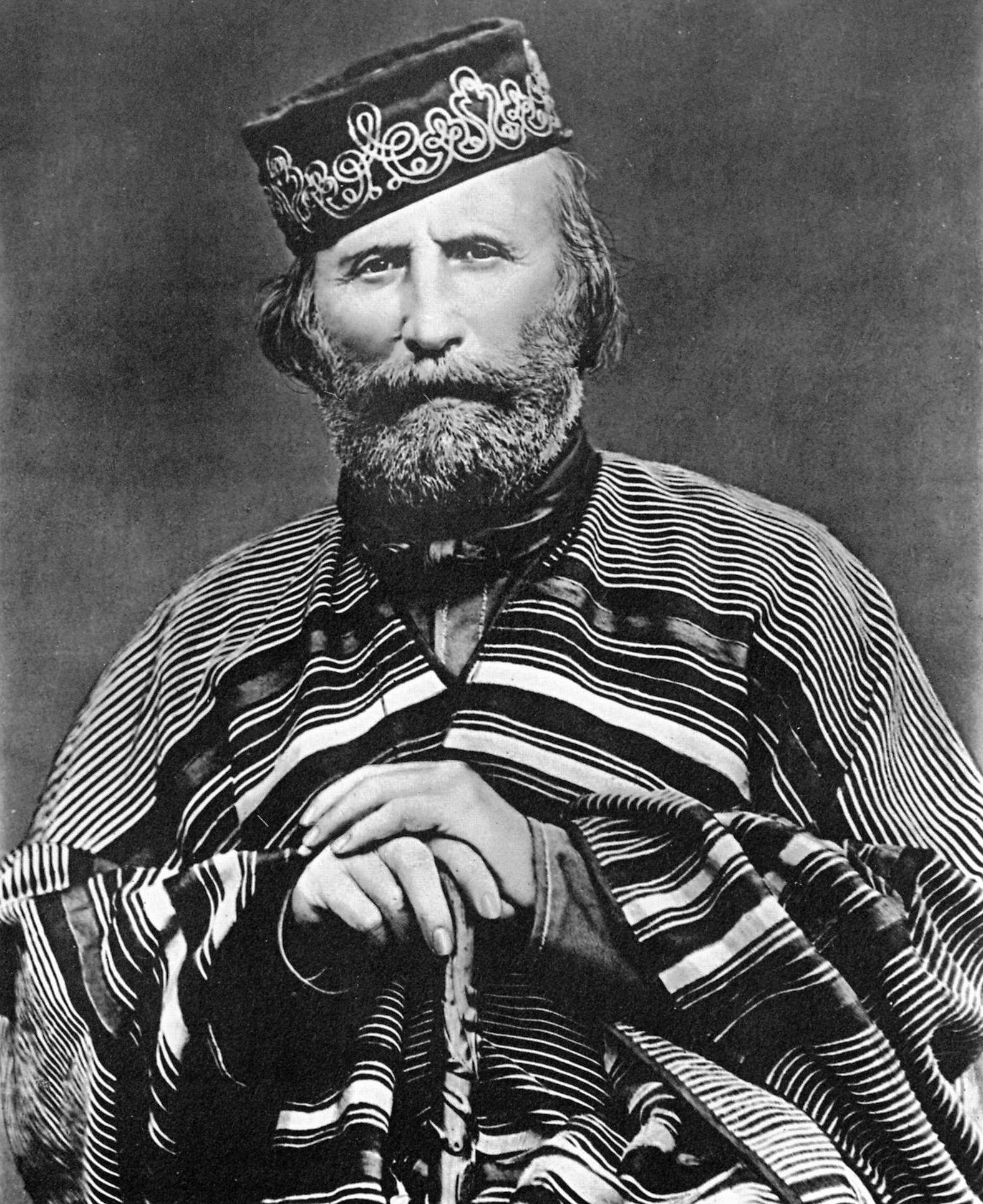
Giuseppe Garibaldi in 1866, four years after surviving a bullet wound misdiagnosed by Partridge

In September 1862, Partridge was selected to travel to Italy to attend Giuseppe Garibaldi, who had been shot just above the right ankle during his march on Rome that summer. Before the invention of X-rays, detection of the bullet was highly problematic, and the surgeons treating Garibaldi disagreed over whether the ball had lodged in his ankle. When, after two weeks, the condition of the ankle had worsened, some began to favour amputation, and fears for the popular Italian patriot grew in England. A public subscription raised over a thousand guineas to send a British surgeon to Italy to provide a second opinion on the bullet wound.

The reason for choosing Partridge for this role is unclear. Although he was, by then, one of the more eminent British surgeons, he never achieved the fame of his colleague, Sir William Fergusson. The Royal College of Surgeons' biography characterises him as 'a painstaking but not a brilliant surgeon; minute in detail and hesitating in execution'. More importantly, he had no experience with gunshot injuries. The contemporary medical press attacked the mission for its serious breach in medical etiquette in presuming to consult on a patient without having been invited to do so by the attending medical practitioners. It amounted to patient stealing, and was an affront to the dignity of the profession (newly self-regulating since the creation of the General Medical Council in 1858). The Lancet was also scathing about the 'new manifestation of the proverbial insular pride which is ever insisting upon the immense superiority of everything British'.

Despite all the mission's detractors, Partridge seems to have been received warmly by the surgeons attending Garibaldi on his arrival in Varignano on 16 September 1862. After examining the patient, he concluded, based largely on the unswollen nature of ankle, that 'the bullet did not enter the joint nor effect a lodgement elsewhere', and that Garibaldi would recover with rest and nursing care.

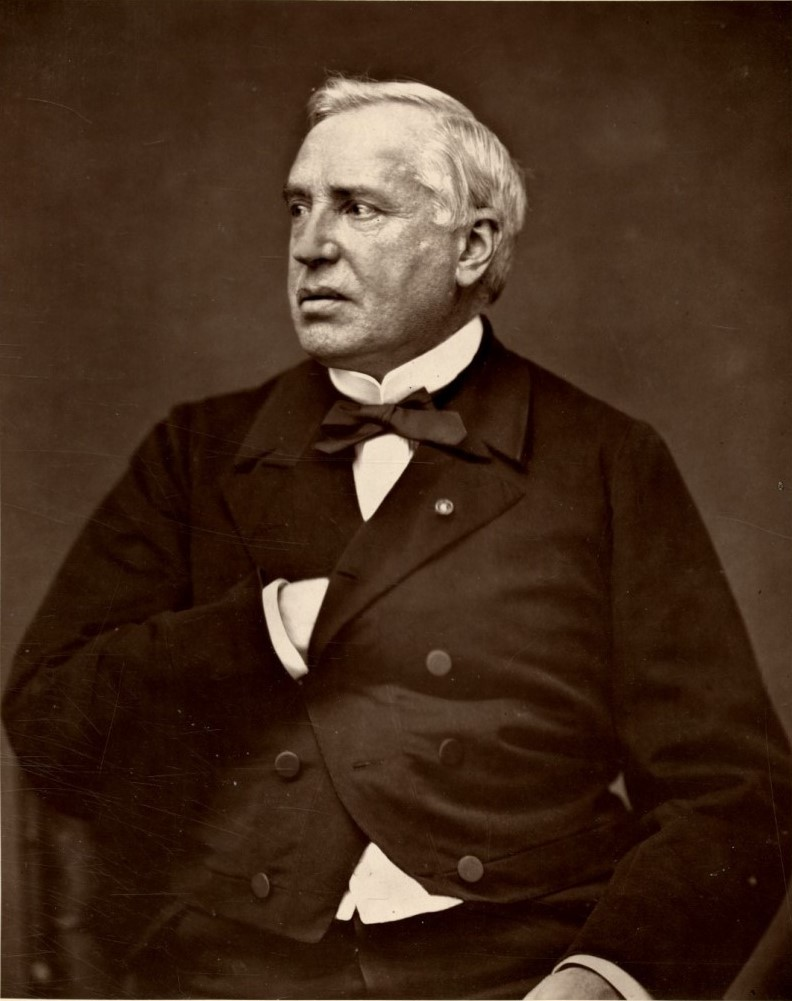
Auguste Nélaton, whose porcelain-tipped probe was key to saving Garibaldi's leg

Unfortunately, this optimistic prediction was not fulfilled; by the end of October, the development of sepsis made amputation appear inevitable. The French surgeon Auguste Nélaton, known for innovations in surgical tools, was asked to examine Garibaldi. An electrical probe designed by Favre had been used previously, without success, in an attempt to determine if the bullet remained. Nélaton used a normal surgical probe to examine the wound, concluding that Partridge had been mistaken and the bullet was indeed lodged in the joint; he recommended extraction using ball forceps. He later designed a special probe with a tip of unglazed porcelain, which could be introduced into the wound and retain an impression of any bullet present. Using this improved probe, the Italian surgeon Zanetti became convinced of the bullet's presence, and successfully extracted it on 23 November, saving Garibaldi's limb. The triumph of an innovative surgical instrument in this case was just one example of a trend over the latter half of the nineteenth century and the beginning of the twentieth towards the acceptance of surgery as a craft, with instruments as essential tools of that craft.

Although Partridge had re-examined the wound shortly after Nélaton's consultation and changed his mind to concur with his French rival, severe damage to the relations between the British and Continental schools of surgery was inevitable. His mistake also substantially harmed his professional reputation.

== Characteristics and works ==
Although nervous during operations, Partridge was careful during after-care of patients. He was a skilled draughtsman, having taken drawing lessons from his brother, John Partridge, and an able lecturer and teacher. He published an article on the face in The Cyclopaedia of Anatomy and Physiology (1839), edited by Robert Bentley Todd, and also wrote and illustrated a work on descriptive anatomy, which was never published.

== Personal life ==
He married Frances Janette Turner; they had several children, among whom was the illustrator and actor Sir John Bernard Partridge. He died in London in 1873. His career never recovered from his error in overlooking the bullet in Garibaldi's wound.
