= John Partridge (artist) =

British artist and portrait painter (1789–1872)

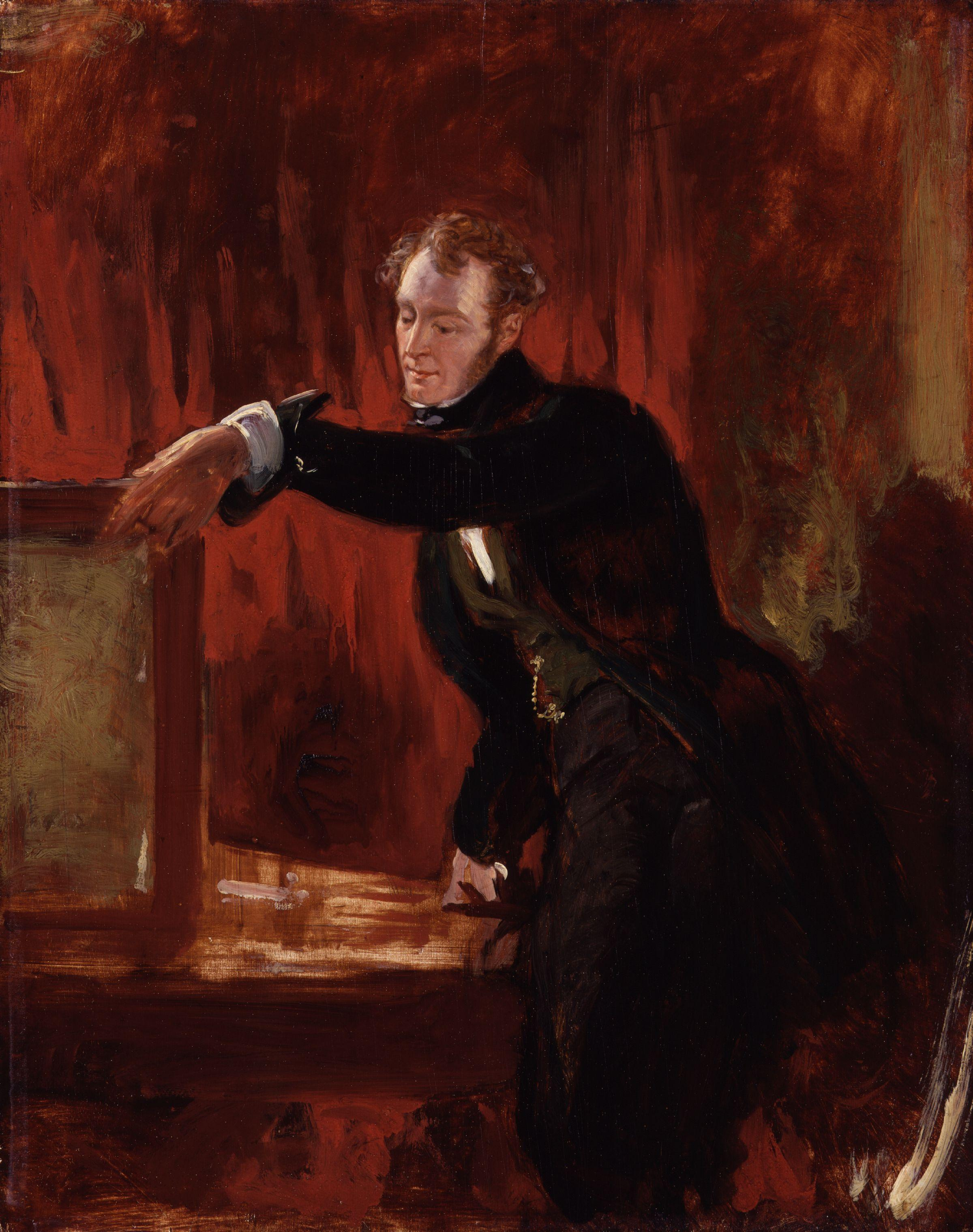
- Self-portrait, c. 1838
- Born: 20 November 1789; Glasgow, Scotland
- Died: 25 November 1872 (aged 83); London, England

John Partridge (20 November 1789 – 25 November 1872) was a British artist and portrait painter. Named 'portrait painter-extraordinary' to Queen Victoria, his pictures depict many of the notable figures of his time.

Born in Glasgow, he was the second son of twelve children of Samuel Partridge. His brother Richard Partridge became the President of the Royal College of Surgeons; his nephew Sir John Bernard Partridge was an illustrator and actor.

== Education and early career ==
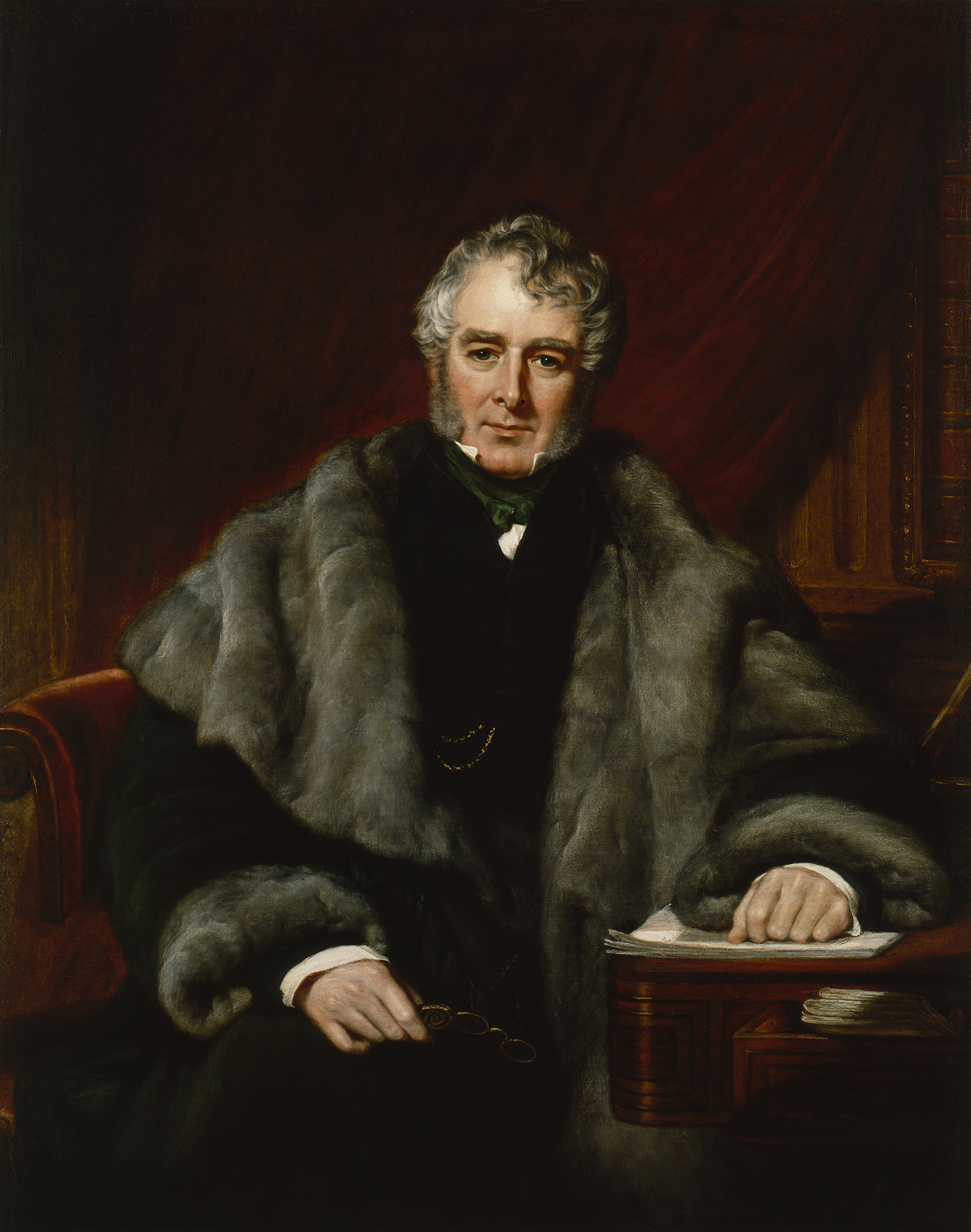
Portrait of Lord Melbourne, 1844.

Partridge studied with the portrait painter Thomas Phillips from 1814; he exhibited his first painting, 'Miss Foote in the Character of Lucilla' at the Royal Academy in 1815. He moved to London the same year, entering the Royal Academy Schools in 1816. At first he lived in Marylebone, then a popular neighbourhood with artists. In 1820, he married his cousin Clementina Sarah Campbell; she featured in his painting 'The artist and his family in his house at 21 Brook Street, Grosvenor Square' (c. 1828–35). From 1823 to 1827, he lived in Italy, staying in Florence, Venice, and Rome. During his time there, his focus widened from pure portraits; he sketched landscapes and made copies of Renaissance masters including Correggio, Raphael, Rubens, Tintoretto and Titian. During his stay in Italy, he gained several wealthy patrons. In 1828, soon after his return from Rome, he left Marylebone for the more upper class Brook Street, off Grosvenor Square, where many of his sitters resided.

== Royal patronage ==
The move seems to have paid off: his career blossomed. Between 1827 and 1845, he painted over two hundred portraits, earning him £2762 in 1841 alone. Many were of prestigious sitters, including an 1836 commission from Leopold I of Belgium, which led two years later to the patronage of Queen Victoria. He painted several successful portraits of the Queen and of Prince Albert, and in 1843, he became a 'portrait painter-extraordinary' to the Queen. Queen Victoria's attentions were, however, to prove fickle, and the 1842 arrival of Franz Xaver Winterhalter, soon the new favourite, cut short Partridge's career as a royal portraitist.

== Later career and legacy ==
In 1846, Partridge made the decision never to exhibit again at the Royal Academy, after two of his portraits were placed insultingly badly, probably in consequence of a dispute more than a decade earlier with fellow artist and Royal Academician, Ramsay Richard Reinagle, over Partridge altering one of Reinagle's pictures for the owner. He did not change his mind even when, two years later, Reinagle was discredited for claiming another artist's work as his own.

Although Partridge set up a gallery in his studio to exhibit his works, commissions plummeted, with only 76 portraits in the period from 1845 to 1865, and his income inevitably suffered. Towards the end of his life, Partridge railed against this injustice in a pamphlet, On the Constitution and Management of the Royal Academy (1864), writing that he had been "driven from the position I held in public estimation and employment ... as the penalty for maintaining any degree of self-respect and independent feeling."

Partridge died in London in 1872. He had earlier donated some of his unsold paintings to the National Portrait Gallery, where many are still on display.

== Portraits and other works ==
Partridge portrayed many of the notable people of the day, with over three hundred portraits in total. In addition to the royal subjects previously mentioned, he painted the prime minister, William Lamb, 2nd Viscount Melbourne, and many other political or noble figures including Henry Fitzalan-Howard, 15th Duke of Norfolk, Richard Grosvenor, 2nd Marquess of Westminster, George Hamilton-Gordon, 4th Earl of Aberdeen, Frederick Lamb, 3rd Viscount Melbourne, Thomas Babington Macaulay, 1st Baron Macaulay, Maharaja Duleep Singh, George Sutherland-Leveson-Gower, 2nd Duke of Sutherland and Henry Temple, 3rd Viscount Palmerston. Other subjects included members of the artistic community such as Daniel Asher Alexander, Robert Trewick Bone, John James Chalon, William Dyce, Sir Charles Lock Eastlake, John Gibson, Charles Robert Leslie, Joseph Severn and Thomas Uwins, and prominent scientists such as Joseph Hodgson and James Watt.

He worked mainly in oil on canvas; several of his paintings were subsequently engraved. His early style was significantly influenced by his teacher Thomas Phillips, who in turn was influenced by Sir Thomas Lawrence.

His other works encompassed landscapes, often depicting Italy, paintings with literary themes, and studies, often of children. The majority were exhibited at the British Institution. Usually small, they included numerous pencil sketches, sometimes incorporating an ink or watercolour wash.

== Gallery ==
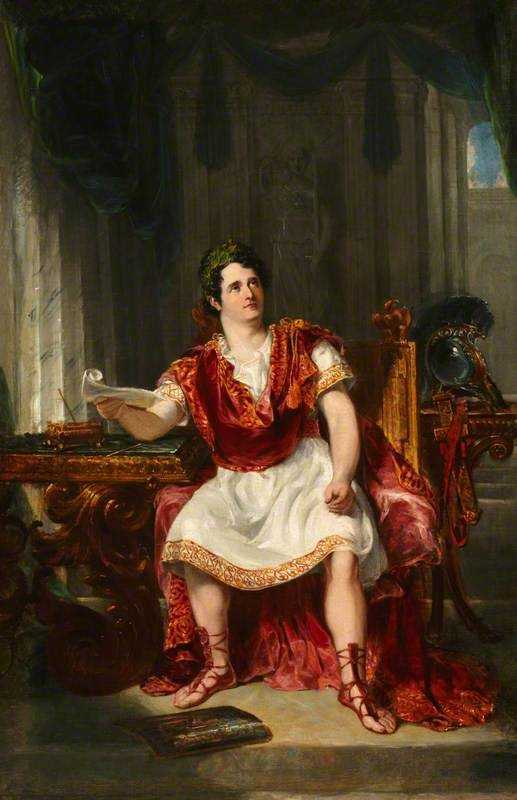
Gaetano Crivelli, 1825

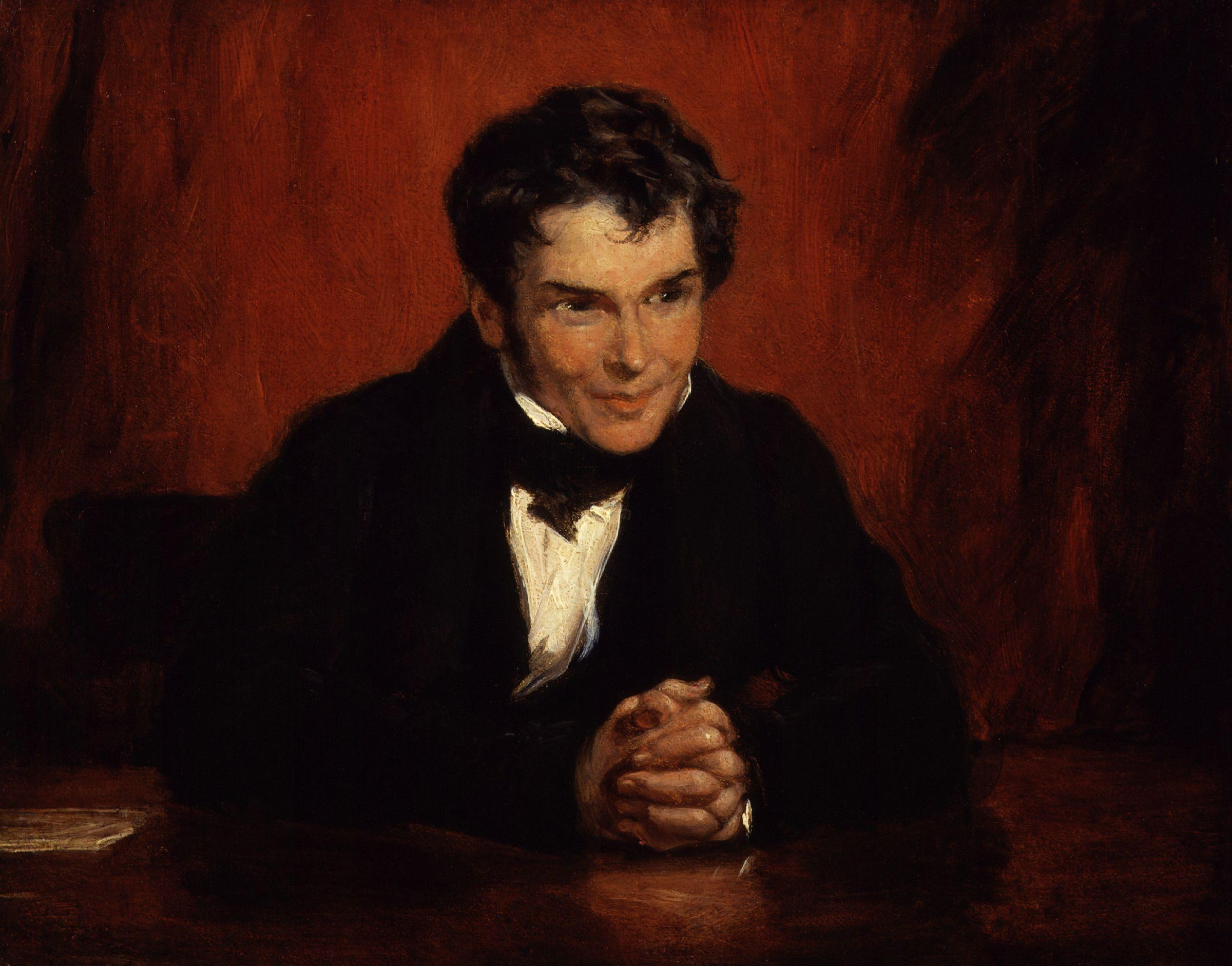
Charles Robert Leslie, 1836

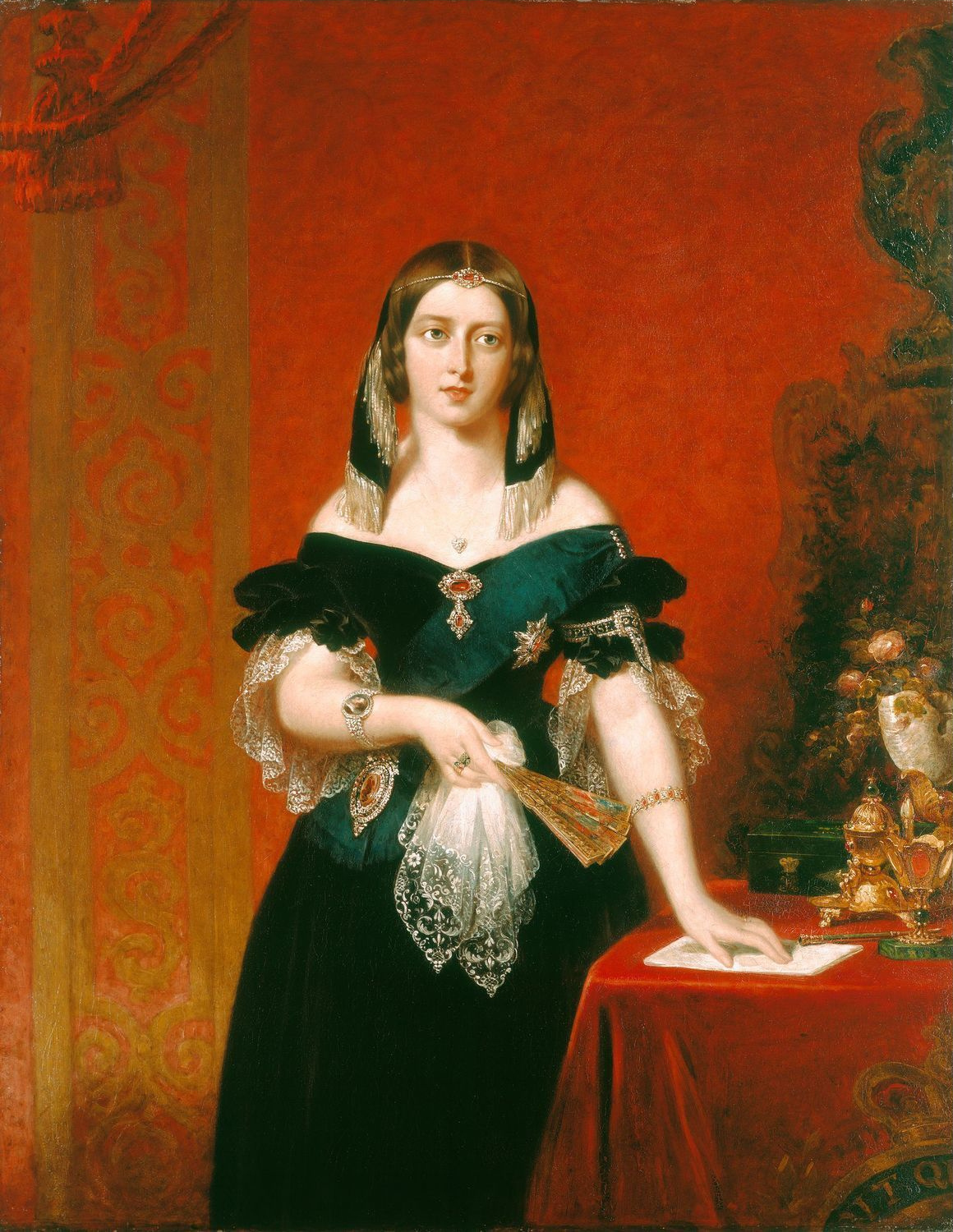
Queen Victoria, 1840

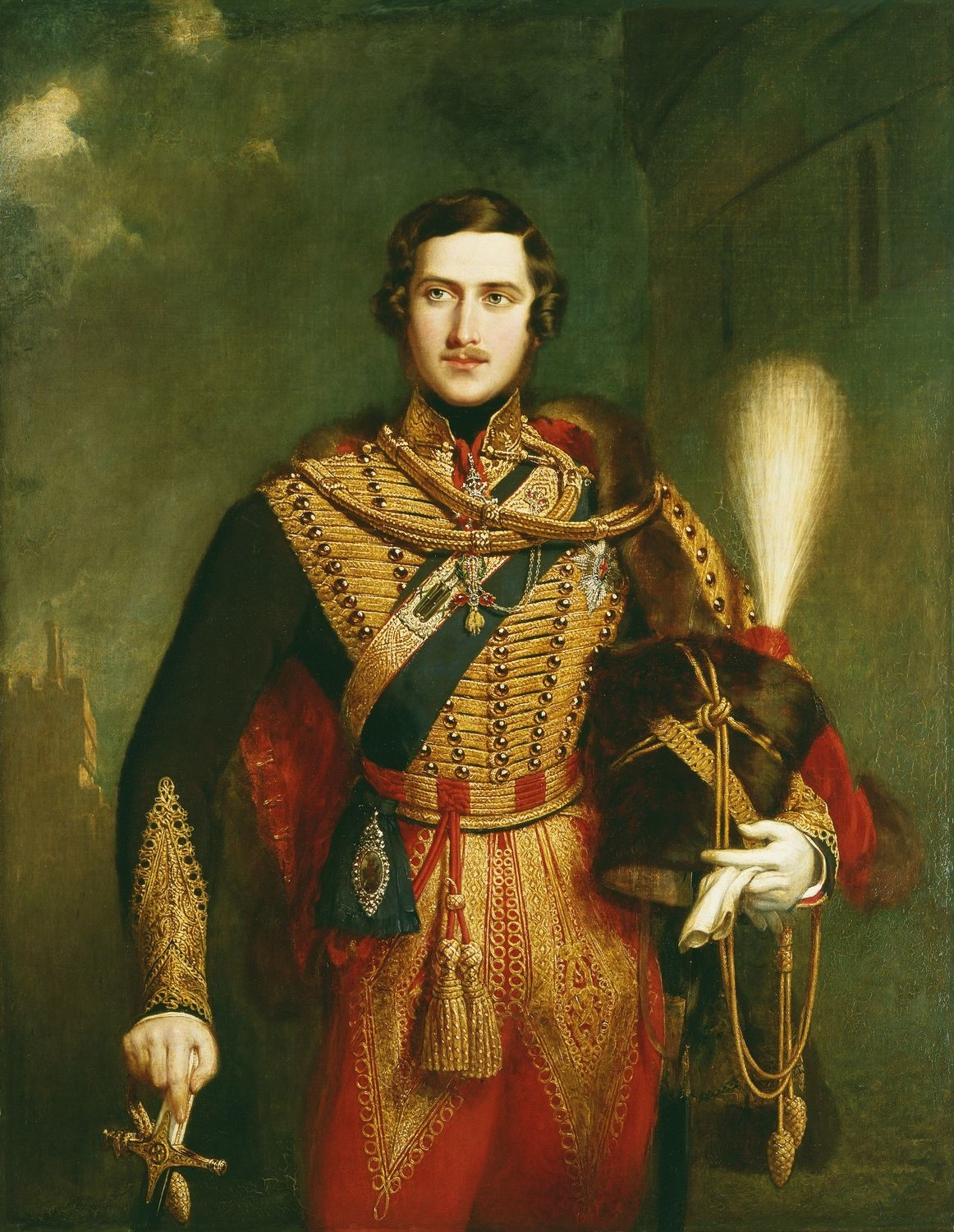
Prince Albert, 1840

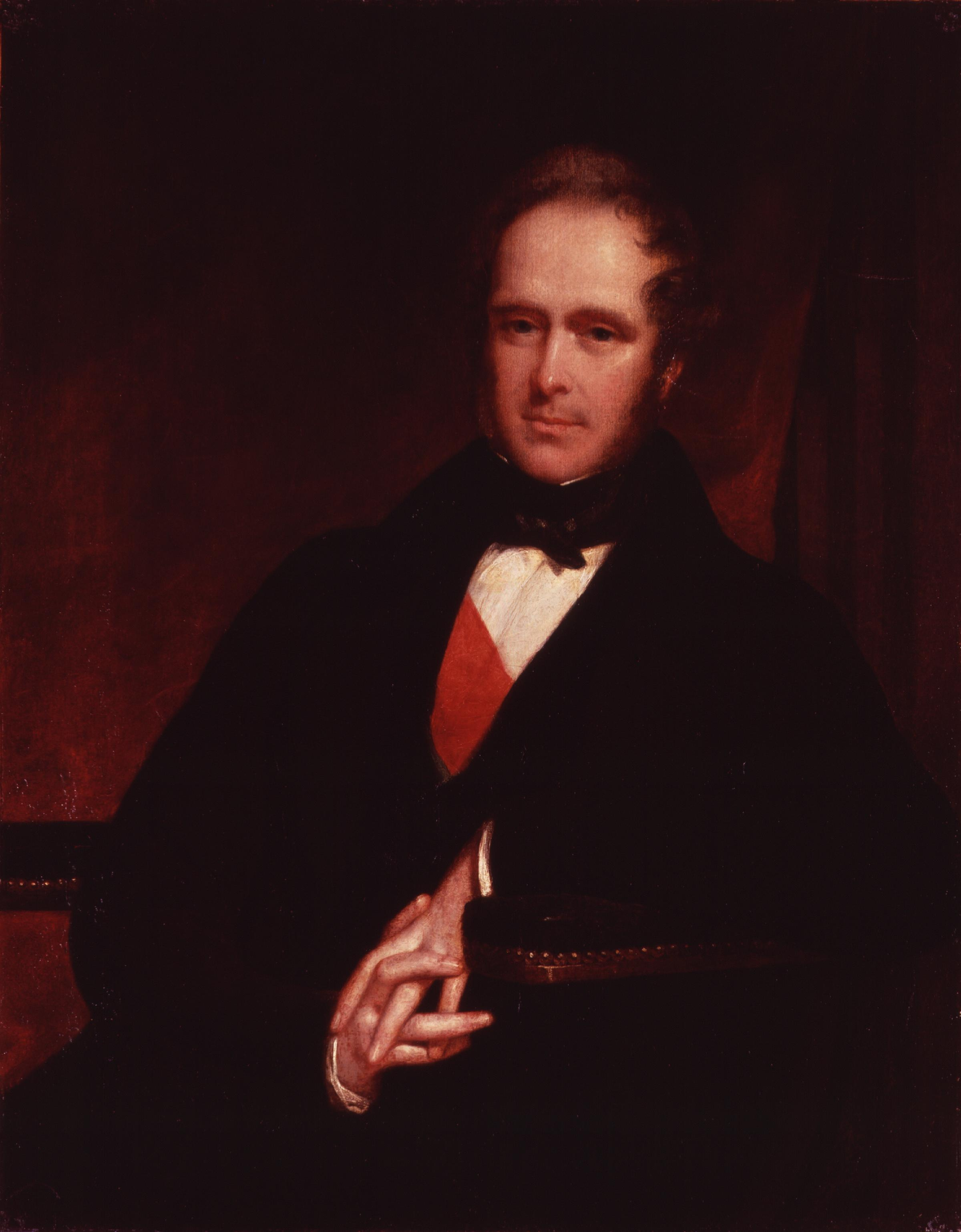
Portrait of Lord Palmerston, c.1845

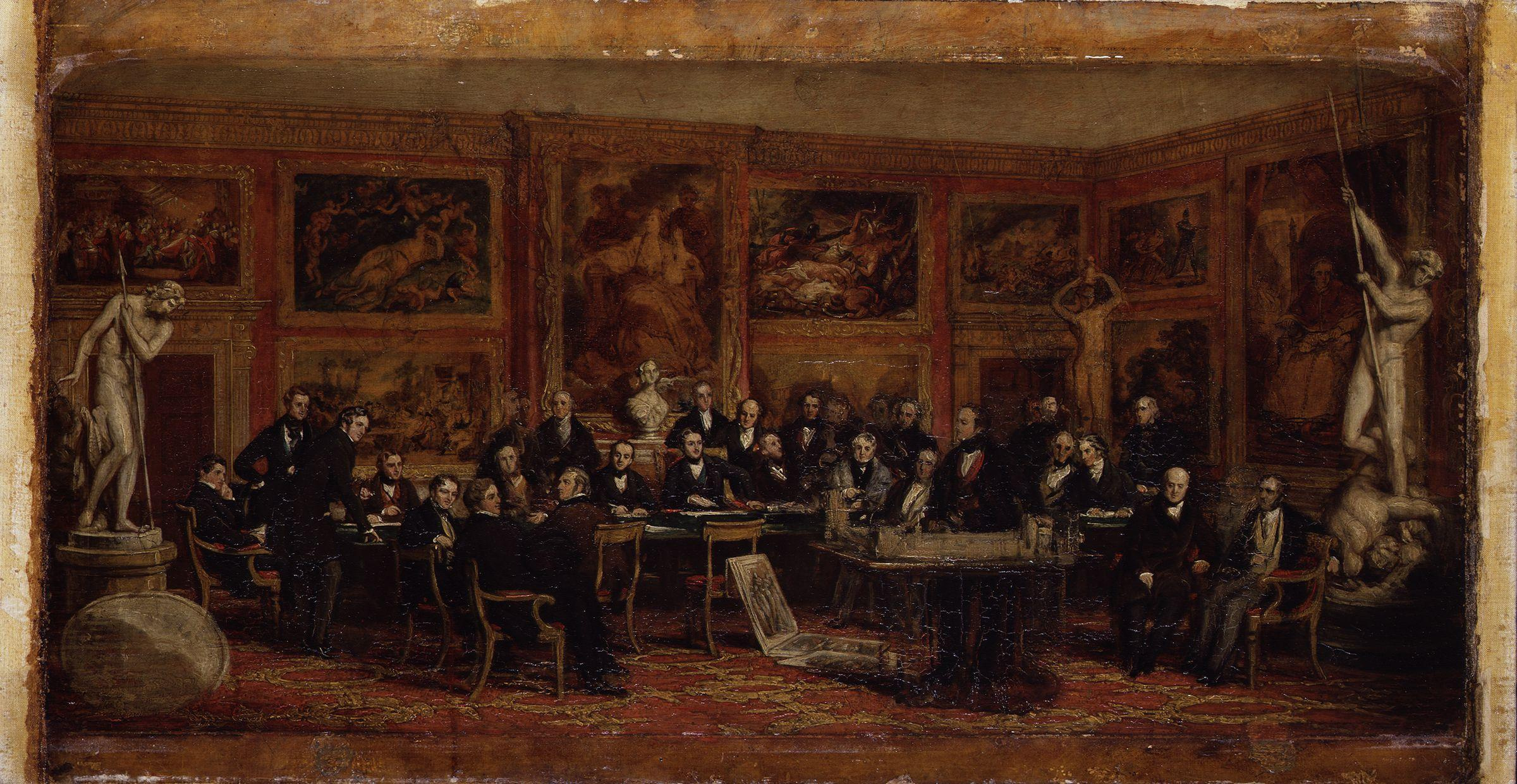
The Fine Arts Commissioners, 1846

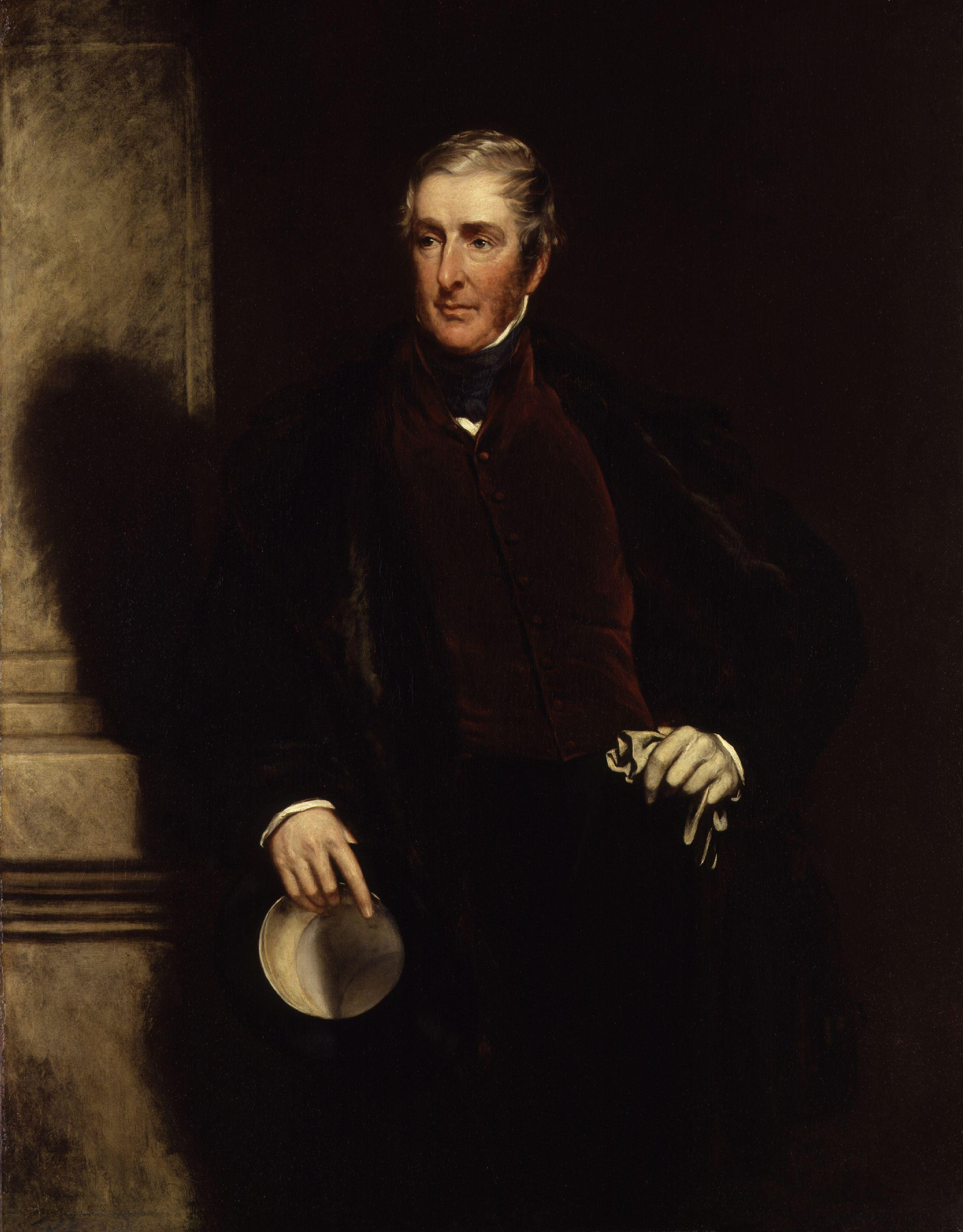
Frederick Lamb, 3rd Viscount Melbourne, 1846

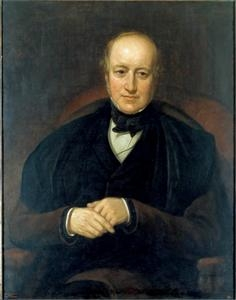
Joseph Hodgson, 1848

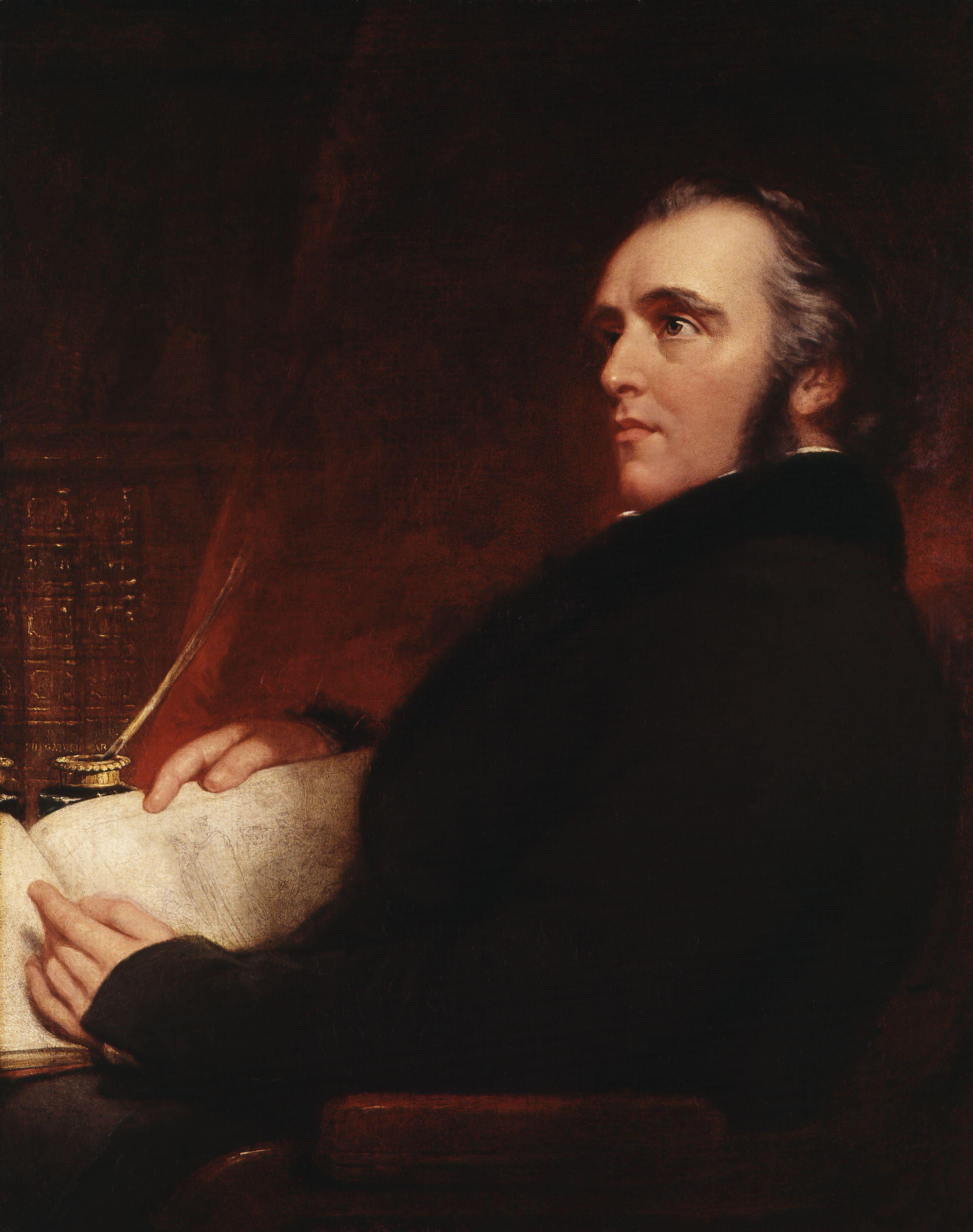
Thomas Babington Macaulay, c.1849

== Selected works ==
Links to online representations are given where available.

- 'The artist and his family in his house at 21 Brook Street, Grosvenor Square' (c. 1828–35)
- 'Satan' (1829)
- 'L'allegrezza' (1833)
- 'John Partridge' (c. 1838)
- 'Queen Victoria' (1840)
- 'Prince Albert' (1841)
- 'William Lamb, 2nd Viscount Melbourne' (1844)
- 'Henry John Temple, 3rd Viscount Palmerston' (1844–5)
- 'The Fine Arts Commissioners, 1846' (c. 1846–53)
