= West Lakes (disambiguation) =

West Lakes commonly refers to West Lakes, South Australia, a suburb of Adelaide. Other uses include:

- West Lakes Academy, a secondary school in Cumbria, England
- West Lakes Classic, a golf tournament held in the Adelaide area of South Australia from 1975 to 1982
- West Lakes District, a neighborhood of Orlando, Florida, U.S.
- West Lakes Football Club, an Australian rules football club based in the western suburbs of Adelaide
- West Lakes Shore, South Australia, a suburb in the Adelaide metropolitan area
- Westfield West Lakes, a shopping center in West Lakes, South Australia

== See also ==
- West Lake (disambiguation)
- Westlake (disambiguation)
