= Portrait of Lord Palmerston =

Painting by John Partridge

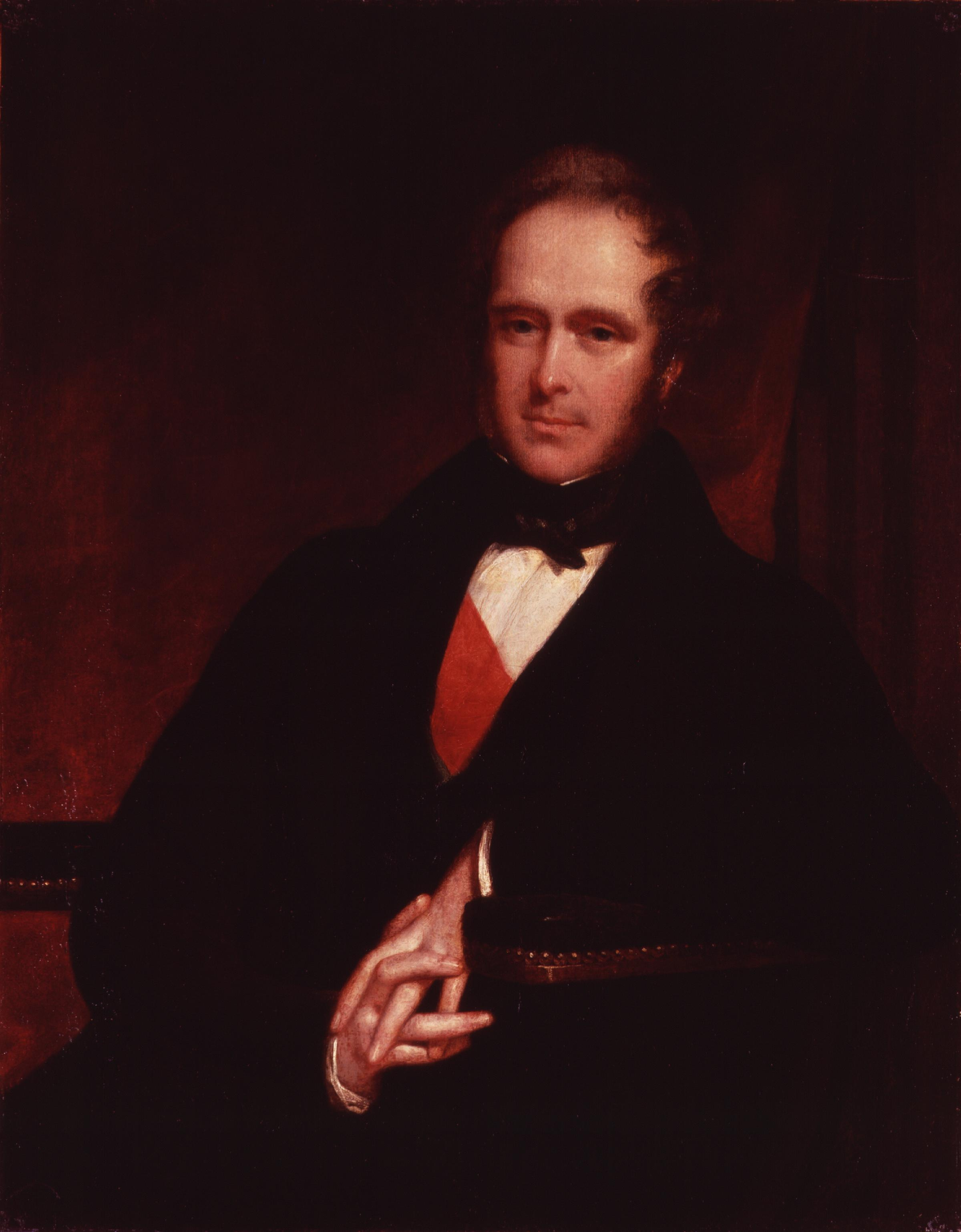
- Artist: John Partridge
- Year: 1845
- Type: Oil on canvas, portrait
- Dimensions: 94 cm × 73.7 cm (37 in × 29.0 in)
- Location: National Portrait Gallery, London

Portrait of Lord Palmerston is an 1845 portrait painting of the British politician and Prime Minister Lord Palmerston by the artist John Partridge. Along with Partridge's Portrait of Lord Melbourne and a painting of Lord Aberdeen the painting was likely done in preparation for the artist's work The Fine Arts Commissioners. Today it is in the collection of the National Portrait Gallery in London having been acquired in 1896.

== Bibliography ==
- Brown, David. Palmerston: A Biography. Yale University Press, 2011.
- Scheele, Godfrey & Scheele, Margaret. The Prince Consort, Man of Many Facets: The World and the Age of Prince Albert. Oresko Books Limited, 1977 .
