= London Burkers =

Group of criminal body snatchers in early 1800s London

The London Burkers were a group of body snatchers operating in London, England, who apparently modeled their activities on the notorious Burke and Hare murders. They came to prominence in 1831 for murdering victims to sell to anatomists, by luring and drugging them at their dwelling in the northern end of Bethnal Green, near St Leonard's, Shoreditch in London. They were also known as the Bethnal Green Gang.

== Background ==
=== Nova Scotia Gardens ===
Nova Scotia Gardens was the area of a brick field, northeast of St Leonard's, Shoreditch. The brick clay had been exhausted and the area began to be filled in with waste ("leystall", literally excrement). Cottages (probably evolving from sheds serving the gardens) came to be built here but were undesirable as they remained below ground level, and so were prone to flooding.

=== Anatomy ===
During the early 19th century, the demand for legally obtained cadavers for the study and teaching of anatomy in British medical schools greatly exceeded the supply. In the 18th century, hundreds had been executed each year, often for quite trivial crimes, but by the 19th century only 55 people were being hanged each year, while as many as 500 were needed. As medical science began to flourish, demand rose sharply and attracted criminal elements willing to obtain specimens by any means. The activities of body-snatchers, or resurrectionists, gave rise to a particular public fear and revulsion. Relatives, or people paid by them, often guarded new graves for a period after burial.

== Murders ==
=== Gang of Burkers ===
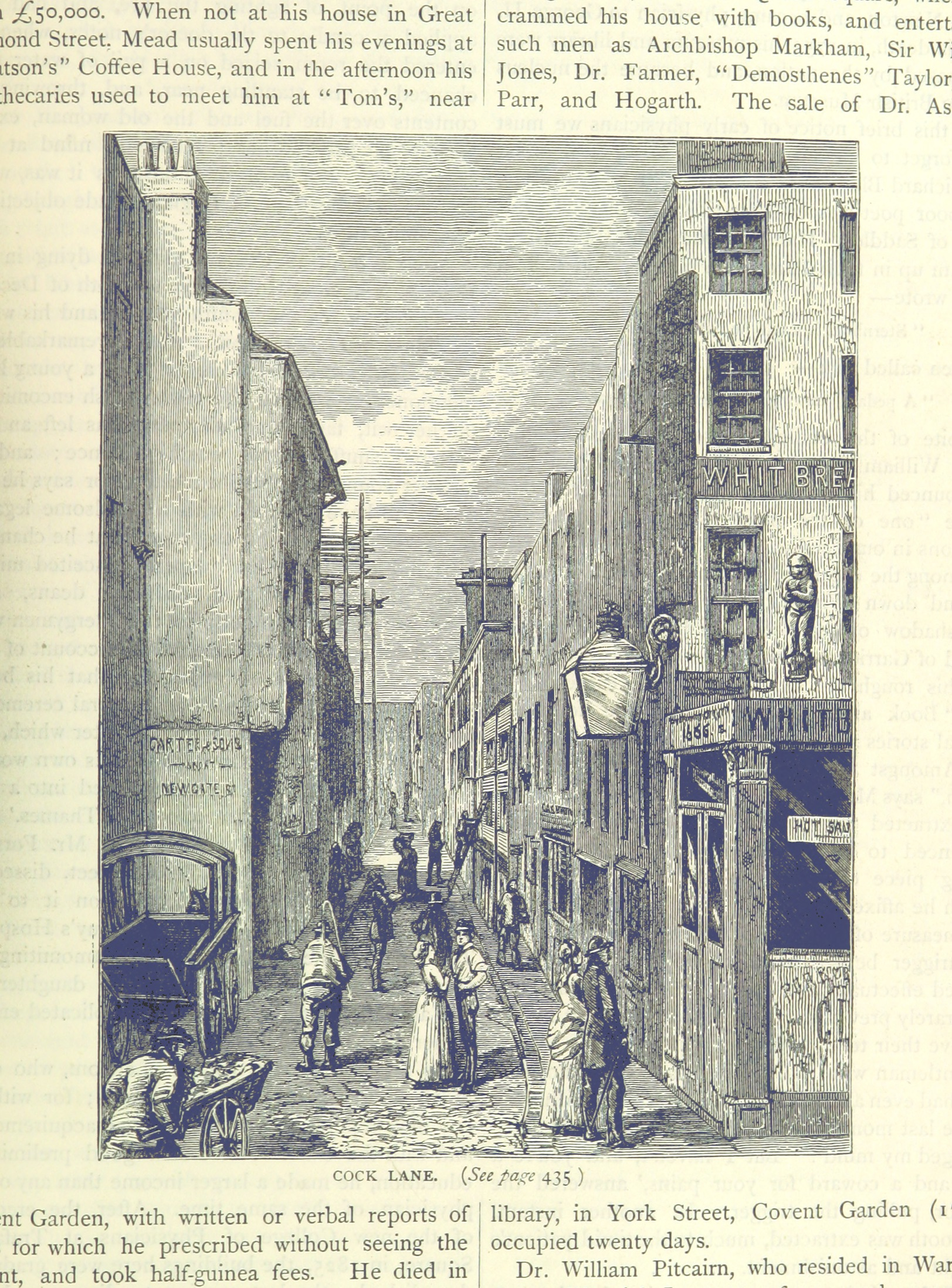
1873 drawing of the Golden Boy of Pye Corner

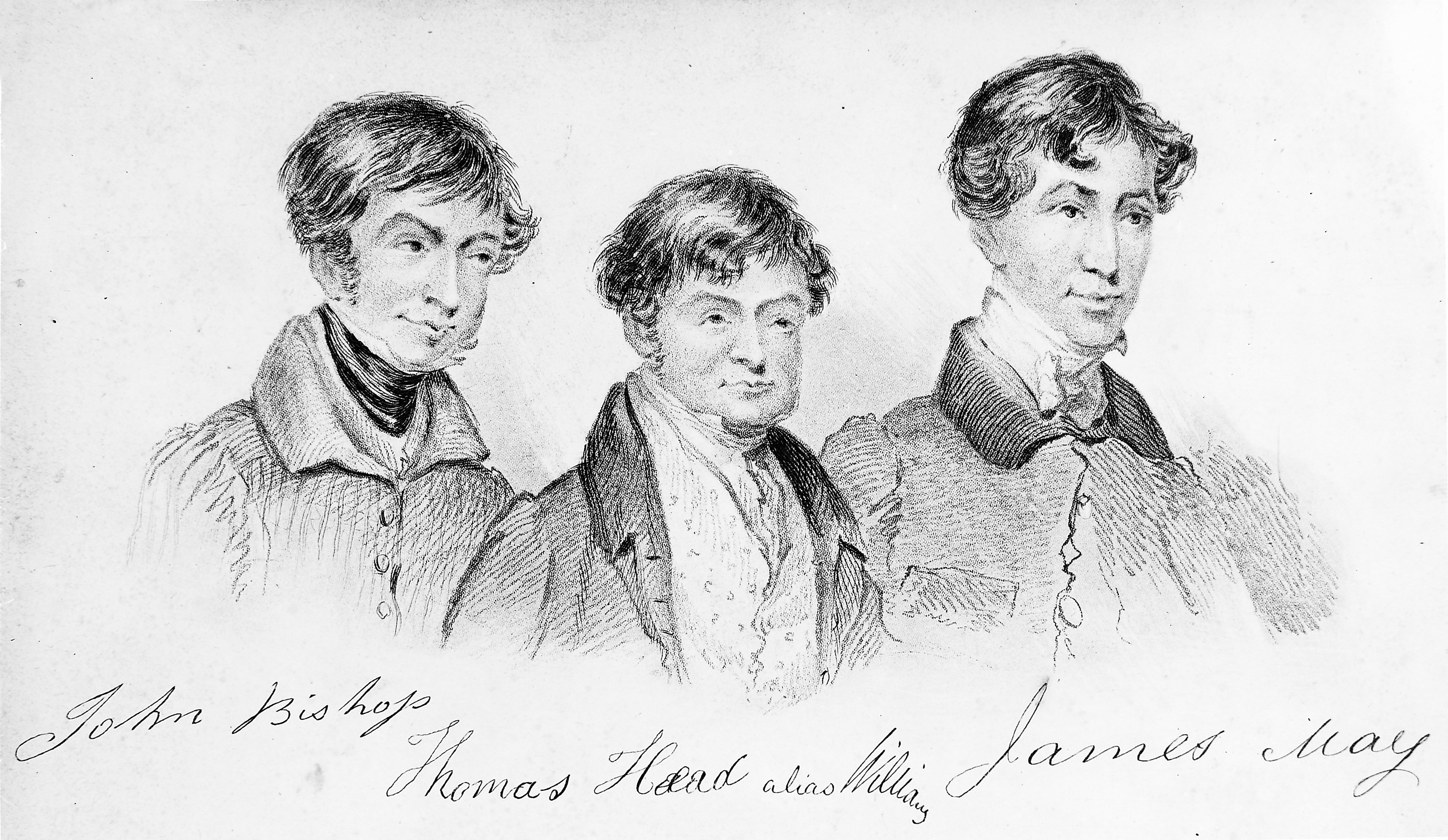
Engraving of the London Burkers, from left: John Bishop, Thomas Williams, James May.

John Bishop, together with Thomas Williams, Michael Shields, a Covent Garden porter, and James May, an unemployed butcher, also known as Jack Stirabout and Black Eyed Jack, formed a notorious gang of resurrection men, stealing freshly buried bodies for sale to anatomists. In his subsequent confession, Bishop admitted to stealing (and selling) between 500 and 1,000 bodies, over a period of twelve years. The corpses were sold to anatomists, including surgeons from St Bartholomew's Hospital, St Thomas' Hospital and King's College. The Fortune of War Public House, at Pye Corner in Smithfield, was identified as a popular resort for resurrectionists. The Fortune of War pub was demolished in 1910.

=== "Italian Boy" Murder ===
In July 1830, John Bishop rented No. 3 Nova Scotia Garden, from Sarah Trueby. On 5 November 1831, the suspiciously fresh corpse of a 14-year-old boy was delivered, by Bishop and May, to the King's College School of Anatomy, in the Strand. They had previously tried to sell the body at Guy's Hospital, but were refused. They demanded twelve guineas for the body but were offered nine. On inspection by Richard Partridge, demonstrator of anatomy, it was suspected that the body had not been buried, and police were summoned by Herbert Mayo, the professor of anatomy, from the station at Covent Garden. The resurrection men were arrested, and remanded in custody, by the magistrate. On 8 November, a coroner's jury was held, and found a verdict of "willful murder against some person or persons unknown", but expressed their strong belief that the prisoners, Bishop, Williams and May, had been concerned in the transaction.

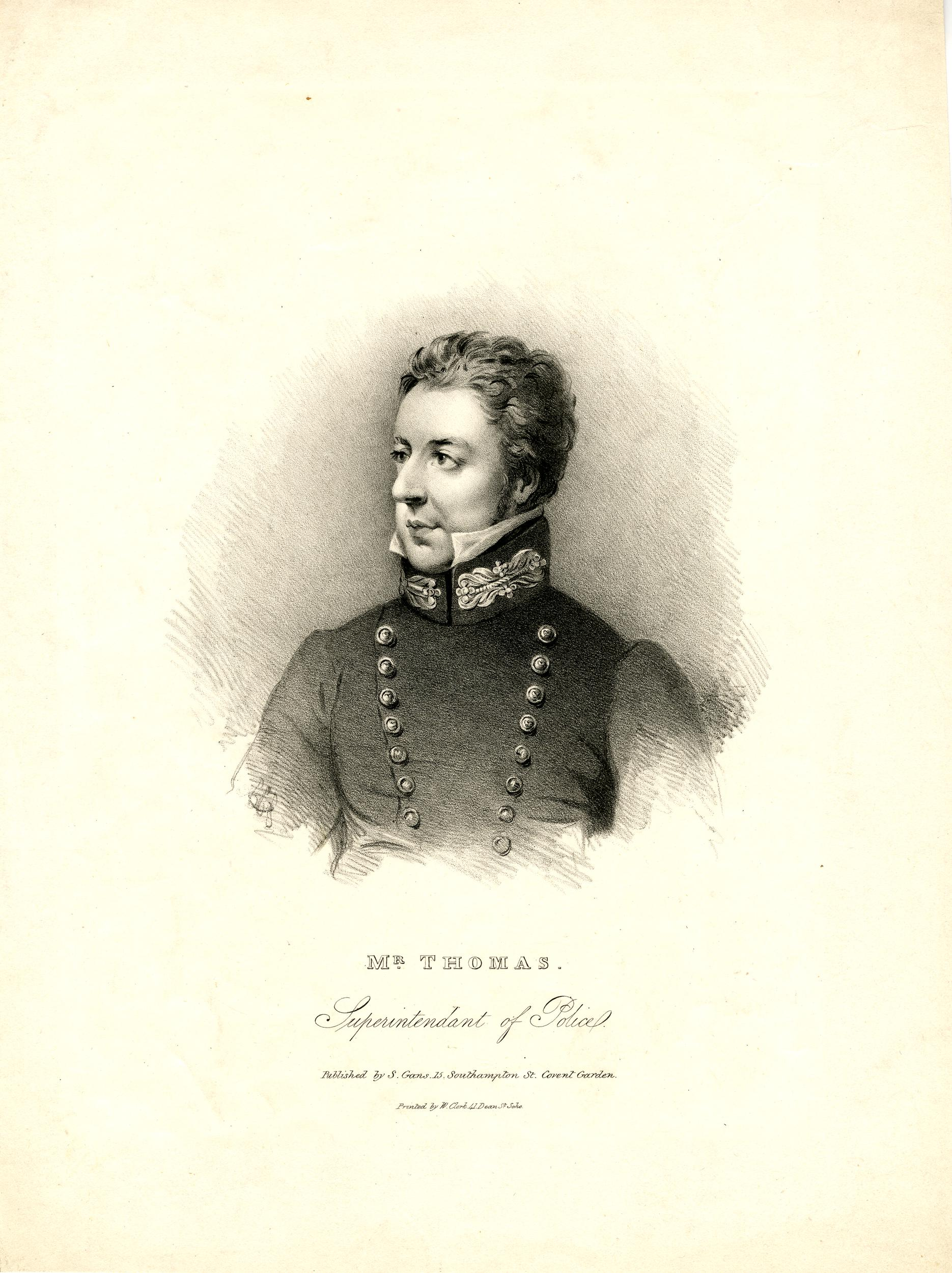
Joseph Sadler Thomas in superintendent's uniform

On 19 November 1831, Joseph Sadler Thomas, a Metropolitan Police superintendent of F (Covent Garden) Division, searched the cottages at Nova Scotia Gardens, and found items of clothing in a well in one of the gardens, and also in one of the privies, suggesting multiple murders. The prisoners appeared at trial, before Chief Justice Tindal, Justice Joseph Littledale and Baron Vaughan, at the Old Bailey between 2 and 3 December. Bishop (aged 33), Williams (aged 26) and May (aged 30) were all found guilty of the crime. The windows were opened to allow the public to hear the Recorder pronounce the sentence of death.

By an extraordinary arrangement, the police opened the premises at Nova Scotia Gardens for viewing, charging 5 shillings. The public carried away the dwellings, piece by piece, as souvenirs. The police had tentatively identified the body as that of Carlo Ferrari, an Italian boy, from Piedmont, but after their trial Bishop and Williams said that the body belonged to a Lincolnshire cattle drover, on his way to Smithfield.

=== Confession ===
Bishop and Williams attended the prison chapel on Sunday, 4 December. Afterwards, they were placed in the same cell and the ordinary and under-sheriffs of London took their written confessions.

John Bishop admitted that the Lincolnshire boy was taken on 3 November, from The Bell in Smithfield, with the excuse of lodging at Nova Scotia Gardens. On arrival, he was drugged with rum and laudanum. Bishop and Williams then went to drink at the Feathers, near Shoreditch church. They returned when the boy had lost consciousness and then pitched him head-first into the well, attaching a cord to the feet. After a brief struggle, the boy was dead; again they went out, and on their return removed and undressed the boy, placing him in a bag.

They also admitted to the murder, on 9 October, of an indigent, Frances Pigburn, sleeping rough in Shoreditch. They lured her into the adjacent empty cottage, No. 2. The method was the same, but this time they had bided their time in the London Apprentice in Old Street. The bodies were taken to St Thomas's, for a surgeon Mr South. Due to a delay in acceptance, they were then taken to a Mr Grainger and sold for eight guineas.

A further victim, a boy named Cunningham, was found sleeping in the pig market at Smithfield on Friday, 21 October; again lodging was promised. He was drugged with a mixture of warm beer, sugar, rum and laudanum, and murdered in the well. He was undressed, bagged, then sold for eight guineas to a Mr Smith at St Bartholomew's Hospital.

The confessions exonerated the other members of the gang, who would often help with delivery, of involvement in the murders.

=== Sentencing ===
Bishop and Williams were hanged at Newgate on 5 December 1831 for the murder, before a crowd of thirty thousand. May was respited during his Majesty's pleasure, as it was accepted that he had no knowledge of the murders. The bodies were removed the same night, Bishop to King's College and Williams to the Theatre of Anatomy in Windmill Street, The Haymarket, for dissection. On the Tuesday and Wednesday, large crowds viewed their remains. James May was sentenced to penal transportation to Van Diemen's Land on 1 December 1831. He received a two-year sentence to Port Arthur for insubordination on board the penal transport vessel and died at the settlement in 1834, buried in an unmarked grave on the Isle of the Dead.

In the same year, Catherine Walsh of Whitechapel, who made her living by selling laces and cotton, was murdered by Elizabeth Ross, who sold the body to surgeons. She was hanged for the murder. These murders and the West Port murders led to the passage of the Anatomy Act 1832 that finally provided for an adequate and legitimate supply of corpses for the medical schools.

By 1840, the area of Nova Scotia Gardens had degenerated into a notorious slum. It is for this reason that the philanthropist, Angela Burdett-Coutts purchased the land, and, after the leases expired, established Columbia Market in 1869.

== See also ==
- List of serial killers in the United Kingdom

== References and notes ==
- An alternate source for the Newgate Calendar Volume V (Tarlton Law Library) accessed 24 Jan 2007
- Harding, William, stenographer. The trial of Bishop, Williams, and May, at the Old Bailey, 2 Dec. 1831, for the murder of the Italian boy, Carlo Ferrier : exact copies of the original confessions of the prisoners Bishop and Williams, and full particulars of their conduct in Newgate, and the execution of Bishop and Williams / corrected and revised by W. Harding, short-hand writer. London : W. Harding, [1831?] 31 pages; 22 cm (Available on Internet Archive)
