= Portrait of Lord Melbourne (Partridge) =

Painting by John Partridge

- Lord Melbourne over chimney piece
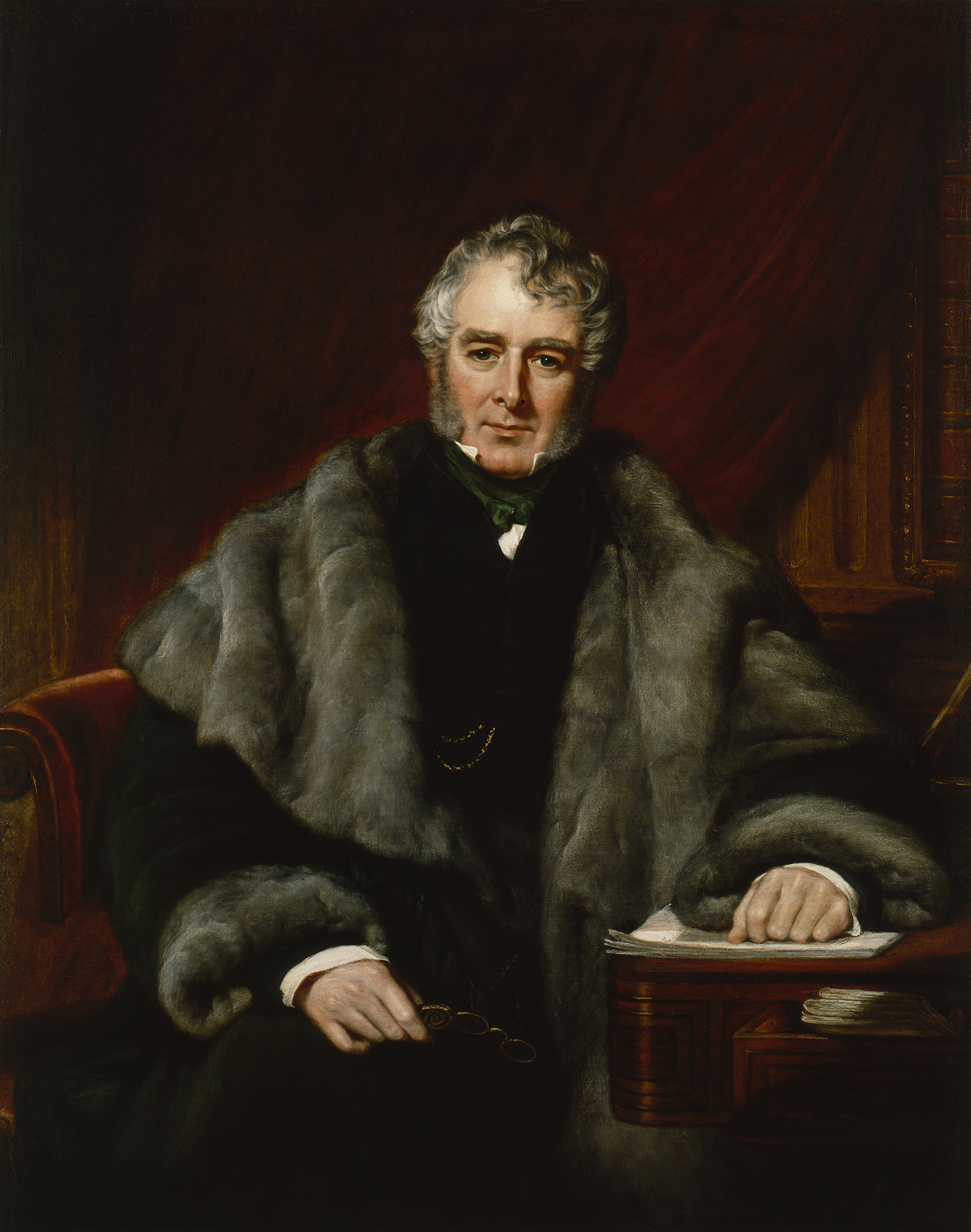
- Artist: John Partridge
- Year: 1844
- Medium: Oil on canvas
- Subject: Lord Melbourne
- Dimensions: 127 cm (50 in) × 101.6 cm (40.0 in)
- Location: National Portrait Gallery, London
- Accession no.: NPG 941
- Identifiers: Art UK artwork ID: william-lamb-2nd-viscount-melbourne-157460

Portrait of Lord Melbourne is an 1844 portrait painting by the English artist John Partridge portraying the British politician and former prime minister William Lamb, 2nd Viscount Melbourne.

Melbourne is shown as a distinguished statesman wearing a fur-lined coat. Behind him on the top right is a large leather bound volume of state papers. The portrait likely grew out of a study of Melbourne for Partridge's work The Fine Arts Commissioners. He also depicted Melbourne's fellow commissioners Lord Aberdeen and Lord Palmerston in portraits in preparation for the painting. The painting is now in the National Portrait Gallery, London, having been donated in 1893 by Lord Carlisle whose father had acquired it from the artist.

== See also ==
- Portrait of Lord Melbourne (Lawrence), an 1805 portrait of the young Melbourne by Thomas Lawrence
- Portrait of Lord Palmerston, an 1845 portrait of Melbourne's colleague by John Partridge
