= Joseph Hodgson =

British physician (1788–1869)

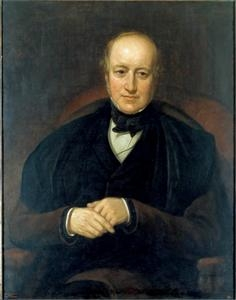
Joseph Hodgson, by John Partridge, 1848

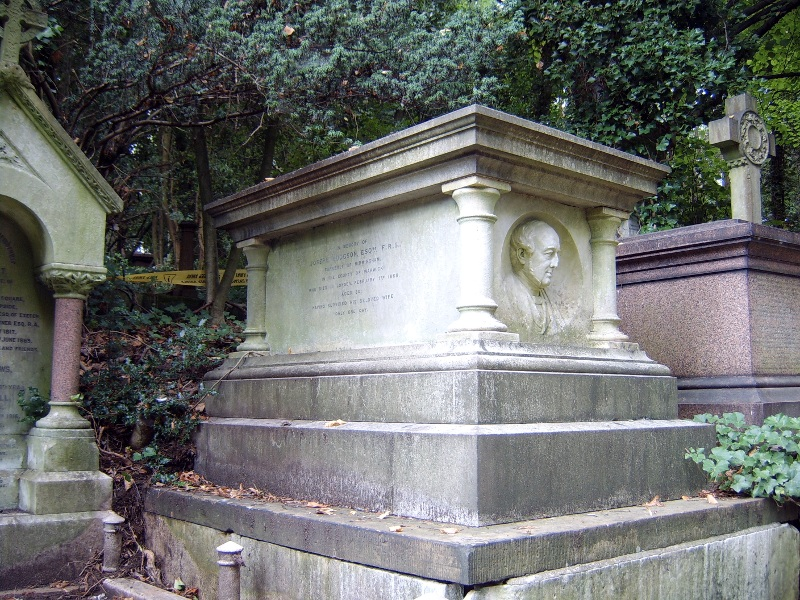
Hodgson's tomb, Highgate Cemetery

Joseph Hodgson (1788 – 7 February 1869) was a British physician and a well-known Quaker. He was born in Penrith, Cumberland, the son of a Birmingham merchant and educated at King Edward VI School, Birmingham, after which he was apprenticed to George Freer at Birmingham General Hospital. He then transferred to St. Bartholomew's Hospital, London.

== Career ==
He practised at King Street, Cheapside, and was editor of the London Medical Review. He also served at the York Military Hospital, Westminster. In 1819 he decided to return to Birmingham and was elected Surgeon to the Birmingham General Hospital in December 1821. In the autumn of 1823 he organised a campaign for an Eye Infirmary in Birmingham which was successful, the Charity opening for the reception of patients on 13 April 1824. He acted as sole Surgeon until May 1828, when at his request he was replaced by Richard Middlemore. He was asked in 1840 to become Surgeon to the Middlesex Hospital and Professor of Surgery at King's College, but declined both offers. In 1849, having made a considerable fortune in Birmingham, chiefly by lithotomy, he returned to London. In 1851 he was made president of the Medical and Chirurgical Society of London.

== Publications ==
He was author of the treatise On Wounds and Diseases of Arteries and Veins. Hodgson is best known for his description of Hodgson's disease, an aneurysmal dilatation of the proximal part of the aorta, often accompanied by dilatation or hypertrophy of the heart.

== Death ==
He died on 7 February 1869, twenty-four hours after his wife, and left one daughter. He was buried at Highgate Cemetery, London.
