= West Lake (Eryuan) =

Lake in Yunnan, China

Eryuan West Lake
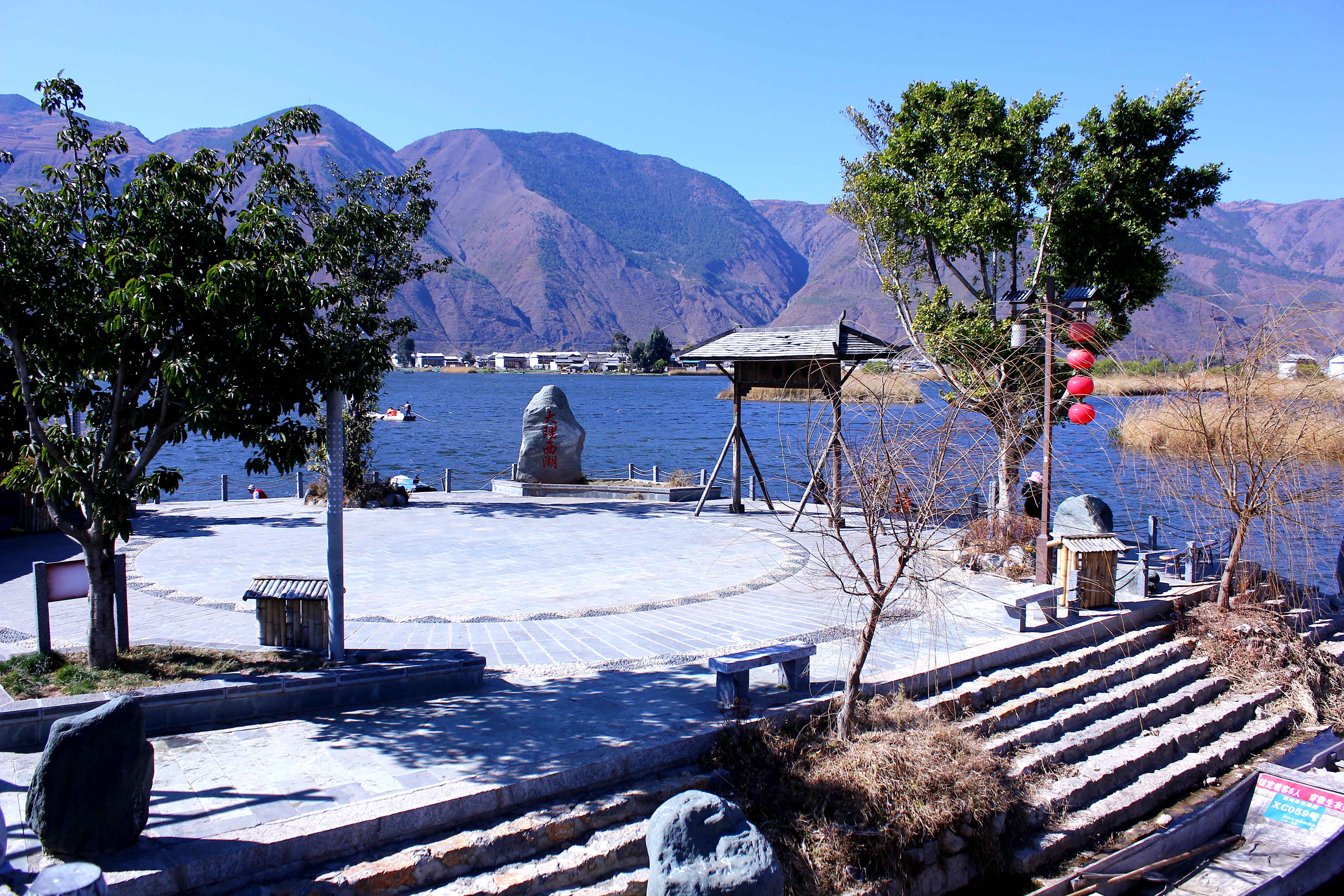

- Location within Yunnan
- Location: Eryuan County, Dali Bai Autonomous Prefecture, Yunnan Province, China
- Coordinates: 26°01′N 100°03′E
- Primary outflows: Luoshi River
- Basin countries: China
- Max. length: 2.6 km (2 mi)
- Max. width: 2.2 km (1 mi)
- Surface area: 2.1 km^{2} (0 sq mi)
- Average depth: 1.8 m (6 ft)
- Max. depth: 8.3 m (27 ft)
- Water volume: 4×10^{6} m^{3} (140×10^{6} cu ft)
- Surface elevation: 1,968 m (6,457 ft)
- Settlements: Yousuo Town

Eryuan West Lake (Chinese: 洱源西湖; pinyin: Ěryuán Xī Hú) or Dali West Lake (Chinese: 大理西湖; pinyin: Dàlǐ Xī Hú) is a plateau lake in western Yunnan province, China. It lies at the northern foot of the snow-covered Cang Mountain. It is drained from the southern end by the Luoshi River, which flows into the Erhai Lake. The lake is about 2.6 long from north to south and 0.8 to 2.2 km wide from east to west. The surface of the lake is about 1,968 metres above sea level. Eryuan West Lake is a famous tourist attraction and State Forestry Administration of the People's Republic of China officially agreed Eryuan West Lake National Wetland Park in 2010.

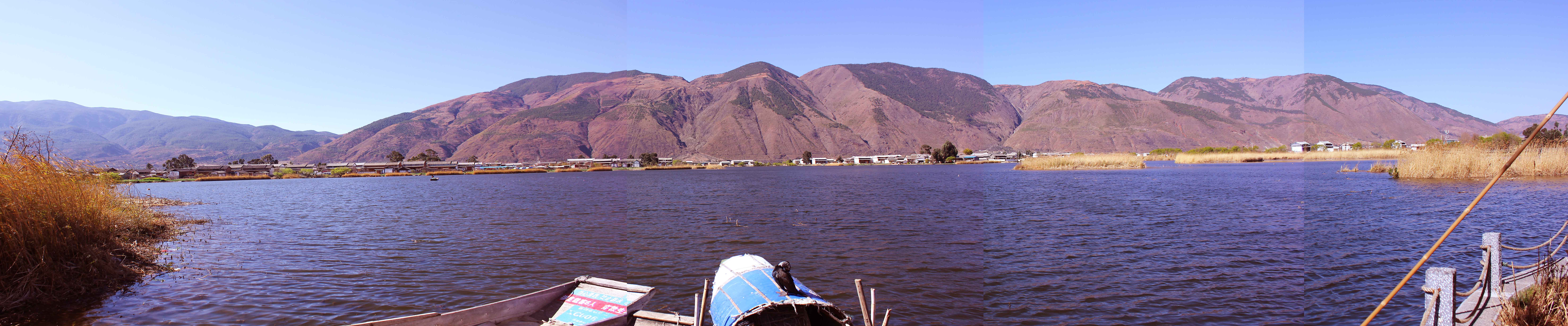
