= Westlake Station =

Westlake Station or West Lake station may refer to:

- West Lake station (Changchun Rail Transit), a metro rail station in Luyuan District, Changchun City, Jilin Province, China
- West Lake station (MARTA), a metro rail station in Atlanta, Georgia, United States
- West Lake Street station, an under construction light rail and bus rapid transit station in Minneapolis, Minnesota, United States
- Westlake station (Sound Transit), a light rail and bus station in Seattle, Washington, United States
- Westlake/MacArthur Park station, a subway station in Los Angeles, California, United States

== See also ==
- West Lake (disambiguation)
- West Lake Cultural Square station
- Soho station
- Xihu metro station
- Xihu Park station
