= West Lake (Chaozhou) =

- 西湖 (Chinese)
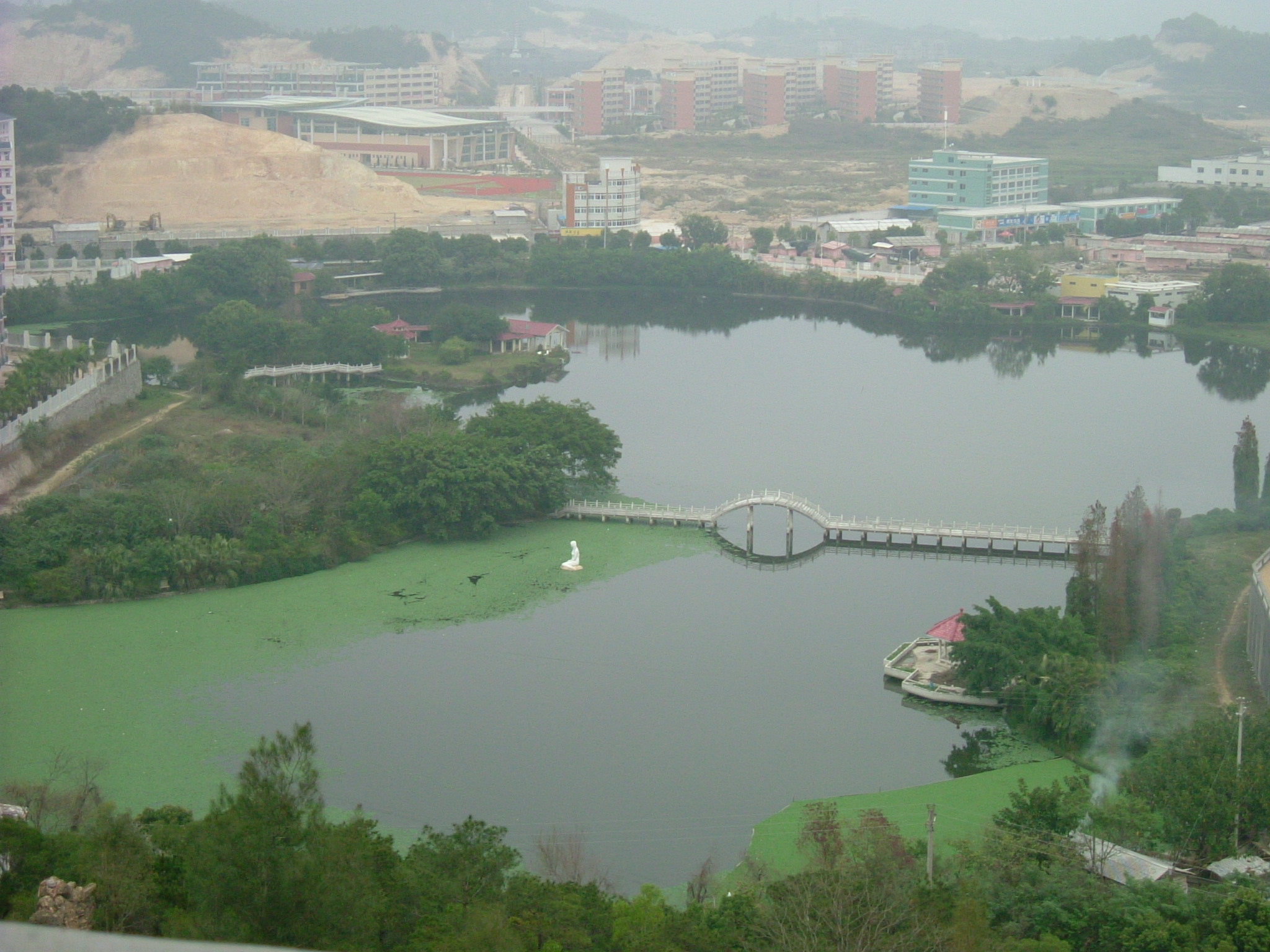
- An aerial view of West Lake.

- Location within Guangdong
- Location: Chao'an District, Chaozhou, Guangdong, China
- Coordinates: 23°40′17.03″N 116°38′17.55″E
- Type: Lake
- Basin countries: China
- Built: Tang dynasty
- Surface area: 2.67 square kilometres (660 acres)
- Max. depth: 5 m (16 ft)

West Lake (Chinese: 西湖; pinyin: Xī Hú) is an artificial lake in Chao'an District of Chaozhou City, Guangdong Province, China.

== History ==
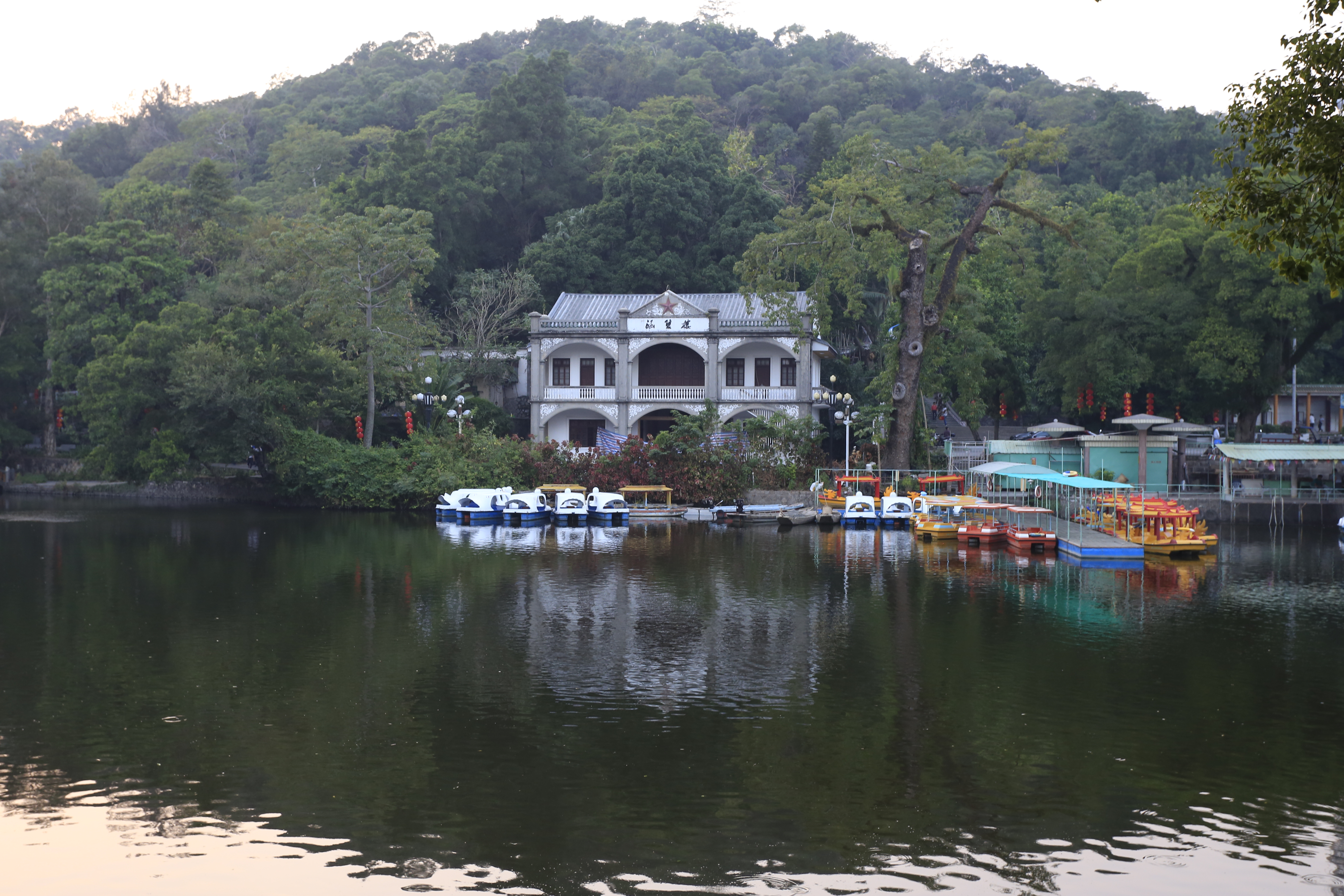
Hanbi Pavilion in 2013.

According to Fang Yu Ji Yao (方舆纪要), the lake was about 5,000 m (3.1 mi) long during the Tang dynasty (618–907). At that time, the local government built the North Dyke (北堤), breaking the link between Hanjiang River and West Lake.

In the Southern Song dynasty (1127–1279), military official Lin Guangshi (林光世) made a positive contribution to West Lake, especially the Mount Hulu (葫芦山) within the lake park. His article Jun Hu Ming (浚湖铭) has been circulated to the present.

In the Yuan dynasty (1271–1368), most of the temples, pagodas and other halls or pavilions were destroyed in the battle of Chaozhou during the Mongolian invasion of the 13th century.

In the early Ming dynasty (1368–1644), in order to erect the city wall, the local government filled the a half of West Lake with stones.

In the Qing dynasty (1644–1911), many literati landscapes were devastated by wars between the Qing army and rebel forces.

During the Republic of China, warlord Hong Zhaolin (洪兆麟) appropriated West Lake as his own garden and named it "Hong Garden" (洪园).

== Tourist attractions ==
The Hanbi Pavilion (涵碧楼) was built in 1922. It is a small two floor Western-style building. During the Nanchang Uprising, it was used as the office for Zhou Enlai. Other attractions include Rainbow-shaped Bridge (虹桥), Mid-Lake Pavilion (湖心亭), Jinghan Pavilion (景韩亭; named after Han Yu), Xinsu Pavilion (新苏亭; named after Su Shi), Wenshan Pavilion (文山亭; named after Wen Tianxiang), Fishing Platform (钓鱼台), and Wild Goose Pagoda (雁塔).

== Gallery ==
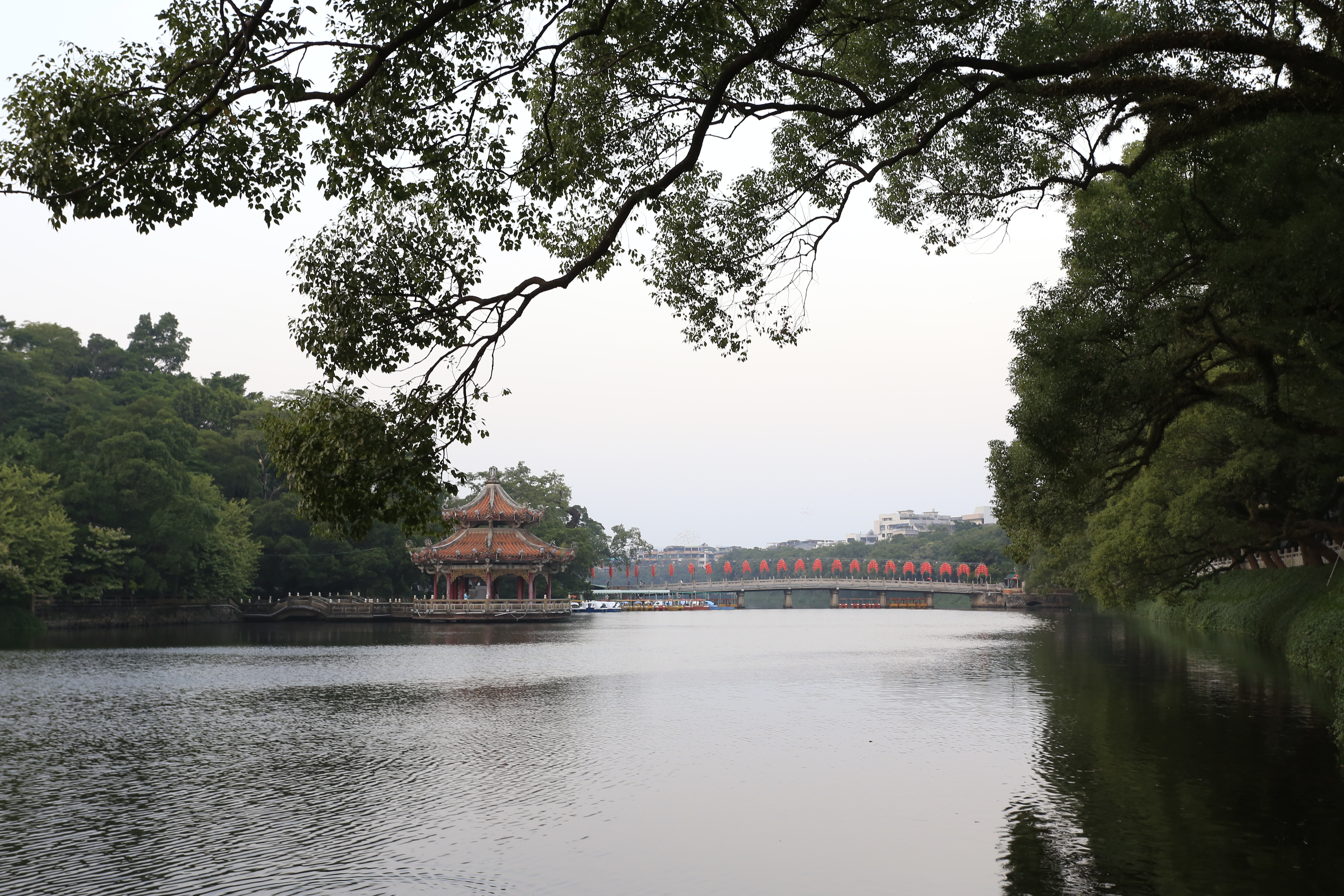
West Lake

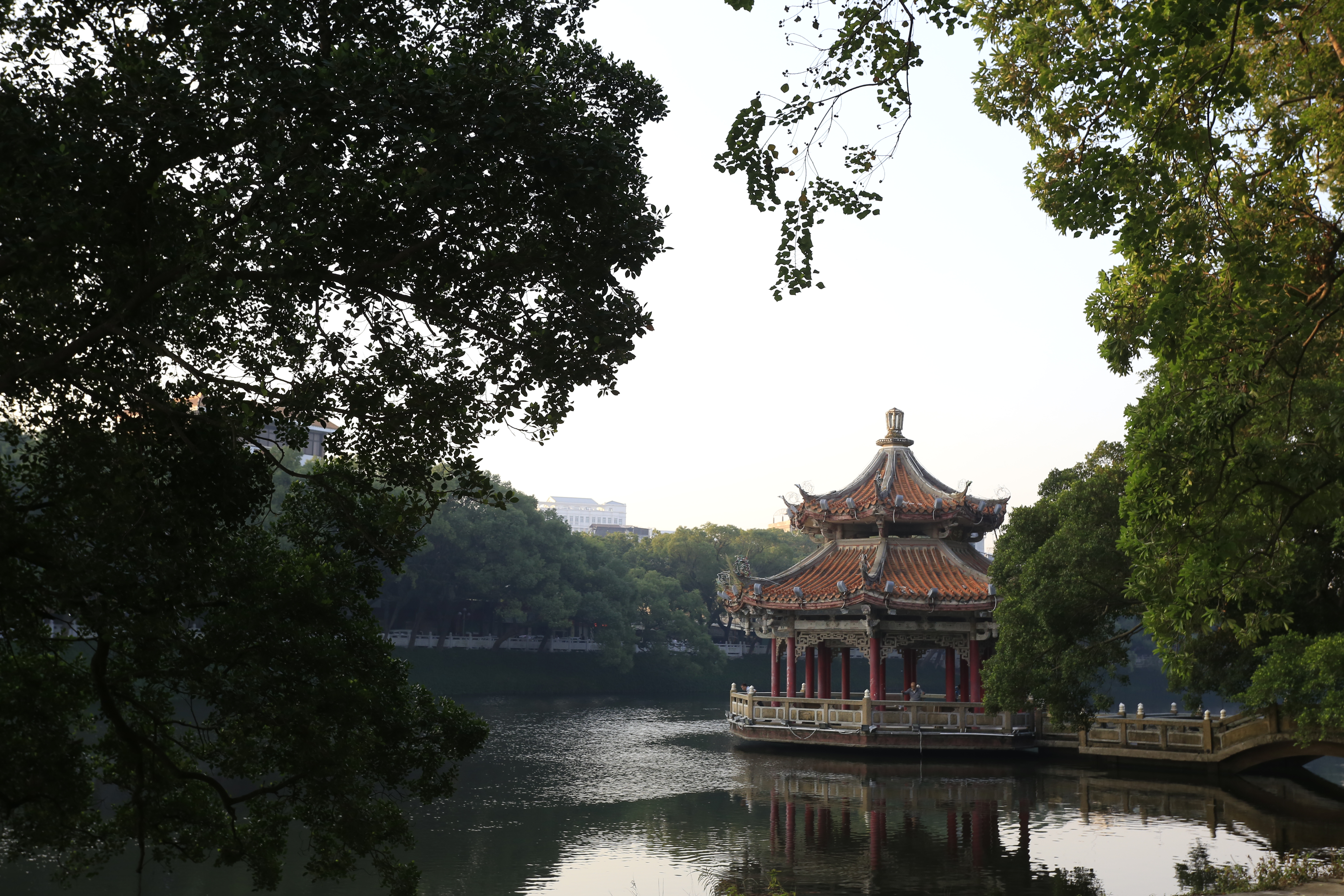
Mid-Lake Pavilion

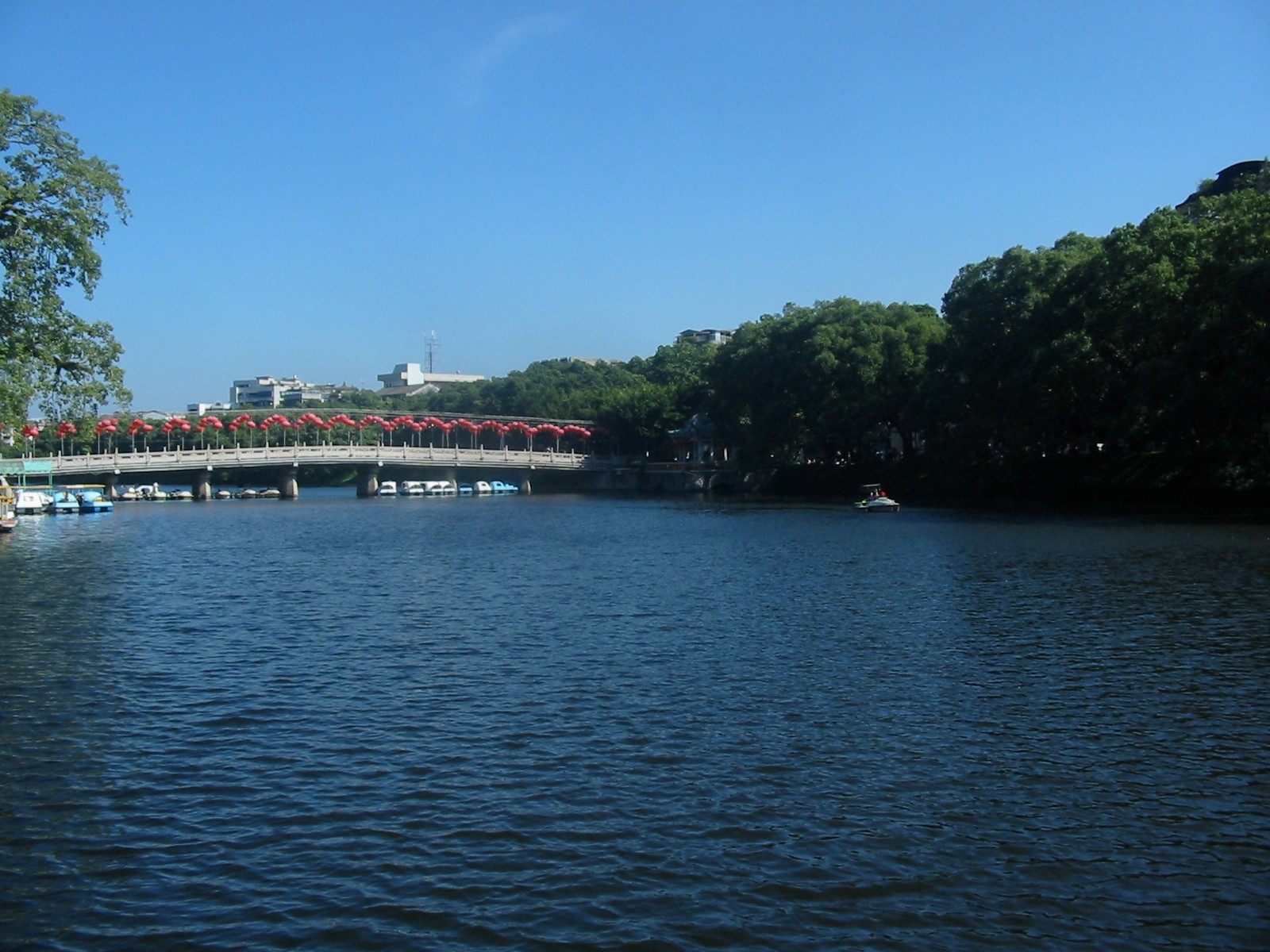
Rainbow-shaped Bridge
