= Philip Westlake =

Philip Westlake was a 19th-century British painter, the brother of Nathaniel Westlake, one of the partners in Lavers, Barraud and Westlake, Ecclesiastical Designers.

== Works ==
- Adoration of the Shepherds, Church of St Mary the Virgin, Cardiff.
- St Dominic's altarpiece in St Dominic's Priory Church.
- Mural of Our Lord with Our Lady and John the Baptist, St. Mary's Church, Ryde.
