= Elizabeth Lamb, Viscountess Melbourne =

British noblewoman

The Right Honourable The Viscountess Melbourne
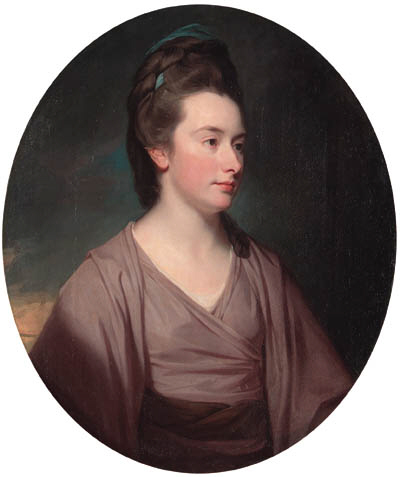
- Portrait by George Romney
- Born: Elizabeth Milbanke; 1751
- Died: 6 April 1818 (aged 66–67); Melbourne House, Piccadilly, London, England
- Spouse: Peniston Lamb, 1st Viscount Melbourne (m. 1769)
- Children: 9, including: Hon. Peniston Lamb; William Lamb, 2nd Viscount Melbourne; Frederick Lamb, 3rd Viscount Melbourne; Hon. George Lamb; Emily Lamb, Countess Cowper
- Parents: Sir Ralph Milbanke, 5th Bt.; Elizabeth Hedworth
- Relatives: John Hedworth (maternal grandfather)

Elizabeth Lamb, Viscountess Melbourne (née Milbanke; 1751 – 1818) was one of the most influential of the political hostesses of the extended Regency period, and the wife of Whig politician Peniston Lamb, 1st Viscount Melbourne. She was the mother of William Lamb, 2nd Viscount Melbourne, who became Prime Minister of the United Kingdom, and several other influential children. Lady Melbourne was known for her political influence and her friendships and romantic relationships with other members of the English aristocracy, including Georgiana Cavendish, Duchess of Devonshire, Francis Russell, 5th Duke of Bedford, and George, Prince of Wales. Because of her numerous love affairs, the paternity of several of her children is a matter of dispute.

== Early life and marriage ==
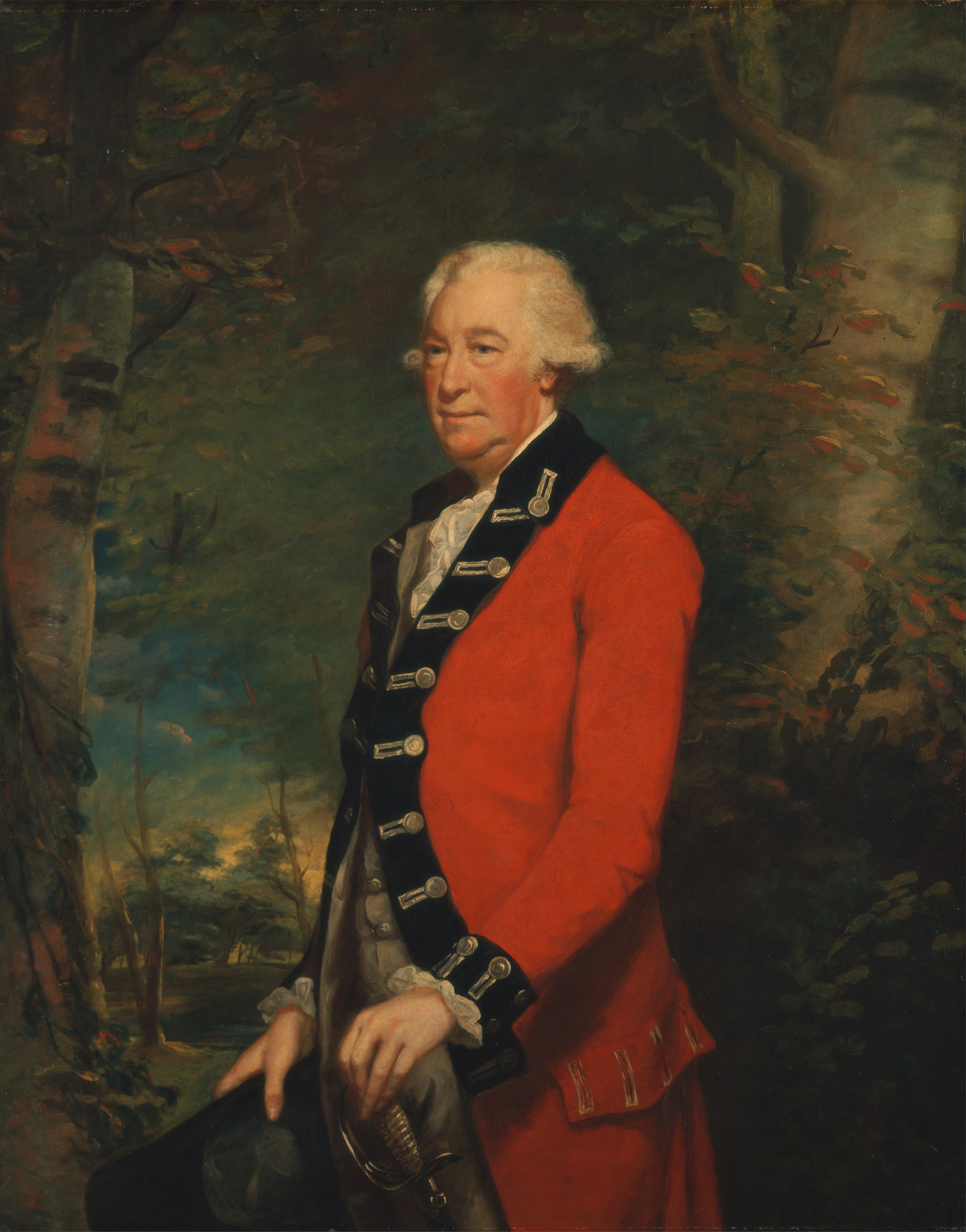
Portrait of Sir Ralph Milbanke by James Northcote, 1784

Elizabeth Milbanke was baptised on 15 October 1751, in the village of Croft-on-Tees, in the North Riding of Yorkshire. She was the youngest child and only daughter of Sir Ralph Milbanke, 5th Baronet, and his wife, Elizabeth (née Hedworth). She had two brothers, with the eldest being Ralph Noel—future Foxite Whig politician and 6th Baronet. The family resided at Halnaby Hall, Yorkshire.

Elizabeth's father was a politician and her maternal grandfather was John Hedworth, a Member of Parliament for County Durham. Elizabeth was privately educated and learned French and poetry composition. Her mother died in 1767. Two years later, Elizabeth met Sir Peniston Lamb, 2nd Baronet; they married in London on 13 April 1769. The couple lived at Melbourne House in Piccadilly and Elizabeth quickly became a well-known figure in London Whig society.

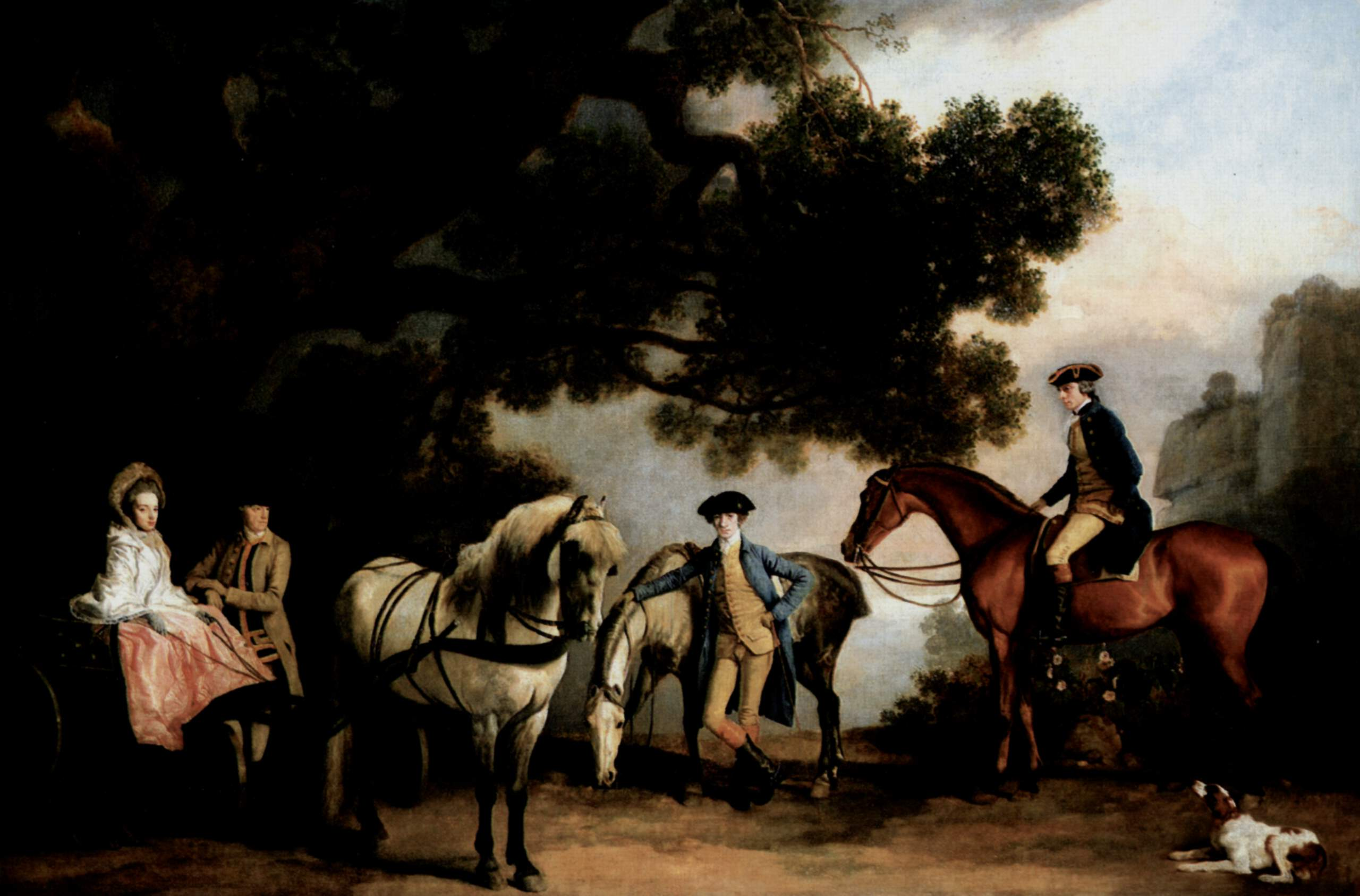
The Milbanke and Melbourne Families by George Stubbs, 1769

She was apparently untroubled by her husband's infidelity early in their marriage with the actress and courtesan, Sophia Baddeley, just as he came to tolerate her numerous love affairs. Peniston was raised to the Peerage of Ireland as Lord Melbourne, Baron of Kilmore, in 1770, and Viscount Melbourne, in 1781. As well as Melbourne House, the family had country residences at Brocket Hall, in Hertfordshire, and Melbourne Hall, in Derbyshire.

== Personal relationships ==
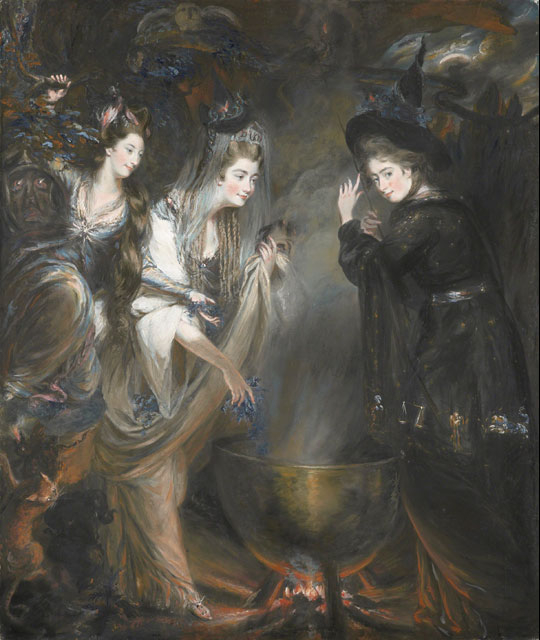
Lady Melbourne with the Duchess of Devonshire and Anne Damer in Witches Round the Cauldron by Daniel Gardner (1775)

From the start of her marriage, Lady Melbourne cultivated friendships that helped her position in society, and her husband's career. These relationships were frequently with men, some of whom became lovers. She was noted for discretion in her affairs: she famously remarked that no man was safe with another's secrets and no woman with her own. Unlike her daughter-in-law, Lady Caroline Lamb, who conducted a very public extramarital affair with Lord Byron, Lady Melbourne had a clear understanding of what society would and would not condone. She was highly intelligent, if not intellectual; it was said of her that, within the rather narrow limits of her experience, her knowledge of the world was remarkable.

She was a devoted mother and worked tirelessly to advance the careers of all her children, especially William. Lord David Cecil remarked that few children have had a better mother, although her reputation for immorality caused them some distress: George once came to blows with a friend who said "your mother is a whore". William, though admitting that his mother's private life was not blameless, called her "the most sagacious woman [he] ever knew" and remarked that "she kept me straight as long as she lived".

After the marriage in 1774 of Lady Georgiana Spencer to William Cavendish, 5th Duke of Devonshire, Lady Melbourne became a close friend of and personal advisor to the Duchess. Until this point, Lady Melbourne had enjoyed unrivalled success as a political hostess and quickly recognised that the young duchess, with a higher rank and better connections, would be a more valuable friend than a rival. The two women were painted, alongside their friend, sculptor Anne Damer, by Daniel Gardner as the Three Witches in his 1775 painting Witches Round the Cauldron. Lady Melbourne featured as the character of Lady Besford in the Duchess' novel The Sylph.

By contrast, she and the Duchess' sister, Henrietta Ponsonby, Countess of Bessborough, disliked each other intensely, and Lady Melbourne's enmity later extended to Henrietta's daughter, Lady Caroline Lamb. True to her practical nature, she did not allow this dislike to interfere with her support for her son William's marriage to Caroline, which was a social step up for the Lamb family, who were still, by the strict social standards of the age, considered to be newcomers to polite society.

By the late 1770s, Lady Melbourne was romantically involved with George Wyndham, 3rd Earl of Egremont. There was a rumour that the Earl had bought her from a previous lover, Lord Coleraine, for £13,000. Egremont remained unmarried, probably due to Lady Melbourne's influence. It is believed that he was the father of Lady Melbourne's children William (born 1779), Emily (born 1787) and possibly Frederick (born 1782). Lord Melbourne, who had affairs of his own, was not greatly troubled by his wife's infidelities. Only once, it is said, did they quarrel on the subject: this was in the strained atmosphere caused by the death of their eldest son Peniston, the only child whom Melbourne knew to be his own flesh and blood. Melbourne is said on that occasion to have expressed resentment of his wife's favouritism towards William, whom Melbourne (like everybody else) believed to be Lord Egremont's son.

In 1782, Lady Melbourne became acquainted with George, Prince of Wales while visiting her son Peniston twice a week at Eton College. The relationship proved to be of benefit to Lord Melbourne, who was made Gentleman of the Bedchamber to Prince George at Carlton House. Lady Melbourne's fourth son George (born 1784) was widely believed to have been fathered by the prince, who acted as the boy's godfather.

Early on, Lady Melbourne seemed to have a fraught relationship with Caroline St. Jules, the wife of her son George. The early years of their marriage were rocky. Lady Melbourne was upset that Caroline St. Jules would confide her marriage problems to her mother, Lady Elizabeth Foster. Foster saw the worst in Caroline's marital problems. She was so furious that George seemed unfazed by his neglect towards her daughter that she is purported to have said to “look upon [George Lamb] to be some kind of monster”. When Caroline had an affair with Henry Brougham, in 1816, Lady Melbourne rebuked her. Caroline reminded Lady Melbourne that George regarded her as a distraction from his work in theatre. In addition, Caroline felt trapped in a marriage where her husband was neglectful and a drunk. Eventually, and Henry Brougham ended their affair. Caroline reconciled with George and stayed with him until his death in 1834.

Later in life, Lady Melbourne formed a friendship with the poet Lord Byron. She became his confidante during his affair with her daughter-in-law Lady Caroline Lamb. Although she approved of her son's marriage on social grounds, Lady Melbourne disliked Caroline intensely and their relationship was always bad. By contrast, she liked Byron and blamed him neither for having the affair with Caroline nor for ending it. Byron later married Lady Melbourne's niece, Anne Isabella Milbanke.

Lord Melbourne was made a peer of the United Kingdom as Baron Melbourne of Melbourne in 1815. Lady Melbourne died on 6 April 1818 at Melbourne House of rheumatism: her slow and painful death distressed her loved ones greatly. It was entirely in character that on her deathbed she urged her daughter Emily to be faithful, not to her husband, Lord Cowper, but to her lover, Lord Palmerston (Emily and Palmerston eventually married after Cowper's death). She was survived by her husband who died in 1828.

== Issue ==
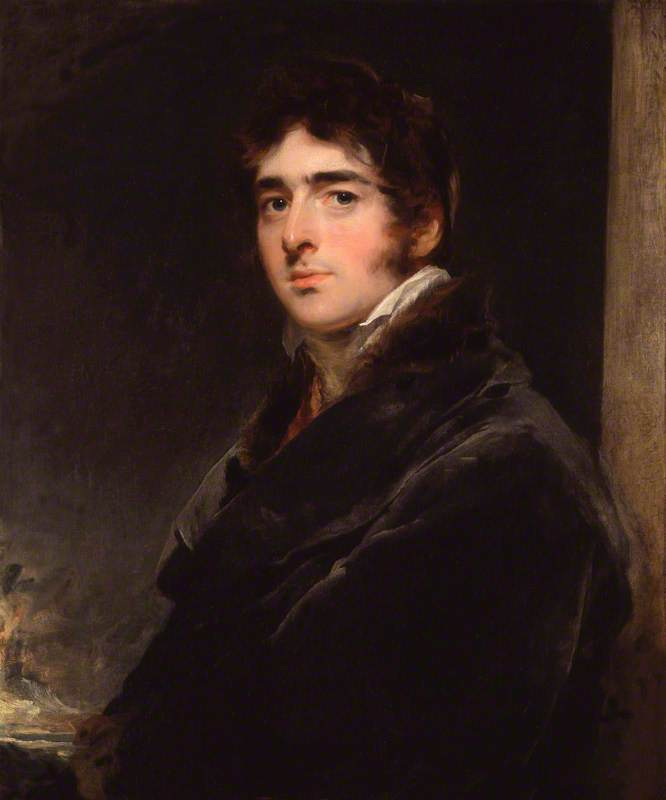
Portrait of Lord Melbourne by Thomas Lawrence.

Lady Melbourne had six children that survived childhood; infant twins died in 1788. Of the remaining six, only the eldest, Peniston, was certainly fathered by Lord Melbourne. Their youngest daughter Harriet died of consumption in 1803 at the age of 14; the young Peniston succumbed to the same illness in 1805, at 34.

- Hon. Peniston Lamb (3 May 1770 – 24 January 1805)
- Elizabeth Lamb (born 25 October 1777)
- William Lamb, 2nd Viscount Melbourne (15 March 1779– 24 November 1848)
- Frederick Lamb, 3rd Viscount Melbourne (17 April 1782 – 29 January 1853)
- Hon. George Lamb (11 July 1784 – 2 January 1834)
- Emily Lamb, Countess Cowper (1787–1869)
- Harriet Lamb (1789–1803)

== Sources ==
- Cecil, David (2006) [1939], The Young Melbourne, Read Books, ISBN 1-4067-3534-5
- Lewis, Judith Schneid (2003), Sacred to Female Patriotism: Gender, Class, and Politics in Late Georgian Britain, Routledge, ISBN 0-415-94412-0
- Melbourne, Elizabeth Milbanke Lamb; Gross, Jonathan David (1998), Byron's "Corbeau Blanc": The Life and Letters of Lady Melbourne, Texas A&M University Press, ISBN 0-89096-672-9
- Stewart, John (2008), Byron and the Websters, McFarland, ISBN 978-0-7864-3240-0
