= The Milbanke and Melbourne Families =

Painting by George Stubbs

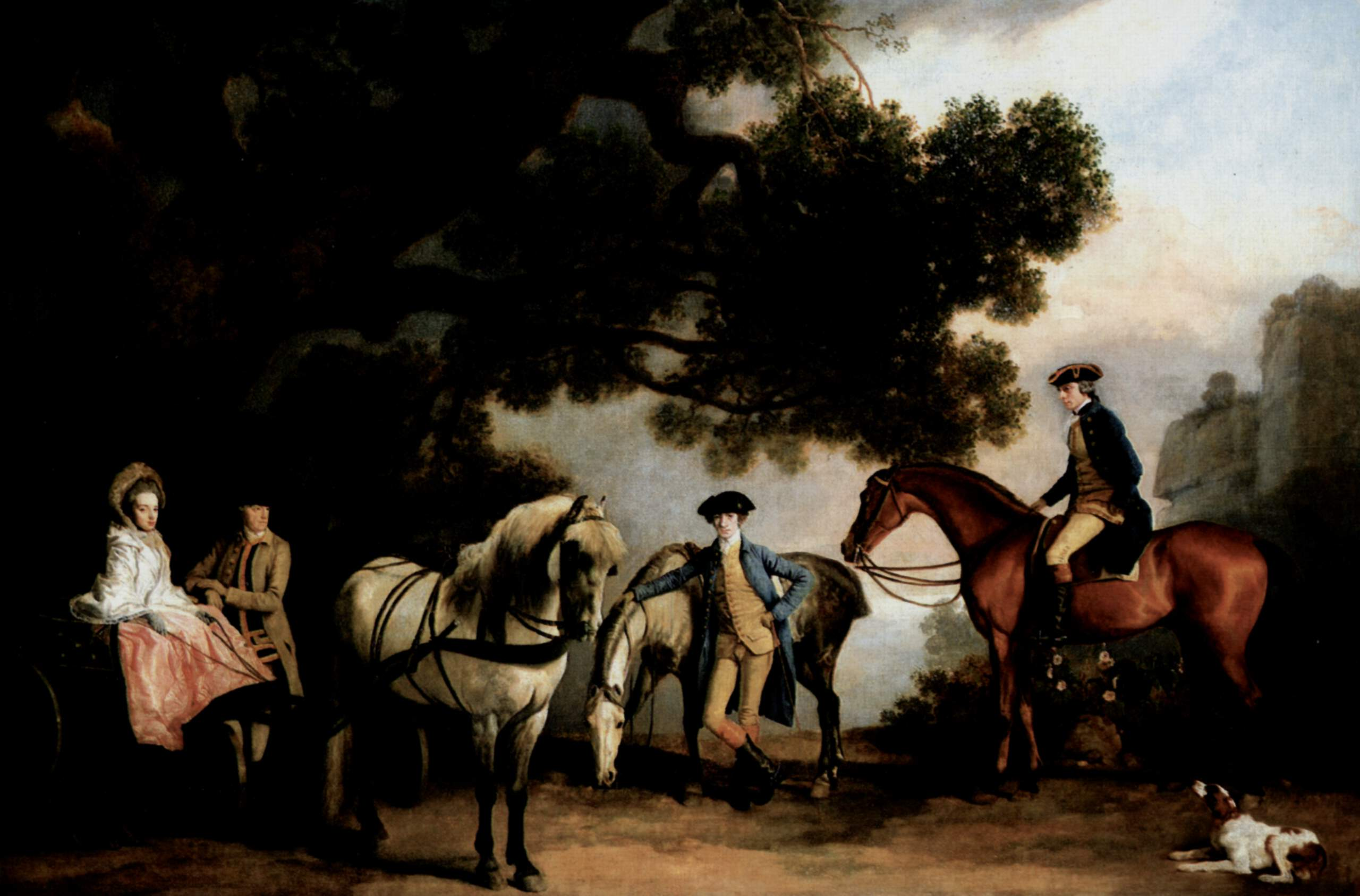
- Artist: George Stubbs
- Year: c. 1769
- Type: Oil on canvas, conversation piece
- Dimensions: 97 cm × 149 cm (38 in × 59 in)
- Location: National Gallery; London

The Milbanke and Melbourne Families is an oil on canvas painting by the English artist George Stubbs, from c. 1769. It is held at the National Gallery, in London.

== History and description ==
A conversation piece, it features four portraits of Sir Ralph Milbanke, 5th Baronet, his daughter Elizabeth, and on horseback on the right, Sir Peniston Lamb. The fourth figure is likely to be John Milbanke, Elizabeth's brother. The painting was almost certainly commissioned to celebrate the marriage alliance between the two families in April 1769, when Elizabeth married Sir Peniston Lamb. Both were wealthy landowning families with politicial ambitions. The couple's son, Lord Melbourne, served as Prime Minister, while their daughter, Emily, married another Prime Minister, Lord Palmerston. Sir Peniston was given the Irish title Baron Melbourne, which explains the title of the painting.

The painting was commissioned by Sir Peniston to hang at his country estate, Brocket Hall, in Hertfordshire. It was almost certainly displayed at the Exhibition of 1770 held by the Society of Artists. Having passed down through the female line of the family for several generations, it is today it is in the collection of the National Gallery, in London, which purchased it in 1977.

== Bibliography ==
- Brown, Colin. Lady M: The Life and Loves of Elizabeth Lamb, Viscountess Melbourne 1751-1818. Amberley Publishing, 2018.
- Egerton, Judy. George Stubbs, Painter. Yale University Press, 2007.
