= Peniston Lamb =

Peniston Lamb may refer to:

- Peniston Lamb, 1st Viscount Melbourne (1745–1828), British politician
- His son Peniston Lamb (1770–1805), British politician, MP for Newport 1793–96 and Hertfordshire 1802–05
