= Portrait of Lord Melbourne =

Portrait of Lord Melbourne may refer to:

- Portrait of Lord Melbourne (Lawrence), a painting by Thomas Lawrence
- Portrait of Lord Melbourne (Partridge), a painting by John Partridge
