= Leaders of the British Whig Party =

This is a list of the Leaders of the British Whig Party. It begins in 1830 as, in the words of J C Sainty, 'it would be misleading to convey the impression that there was in any precise sense a Leader of the Whig Party in the House of Lords before 1830'. Also, Cook & Stevenson, British Historical Facts 1760–1830 have no section for party leaders in either House of Parliament. The section on 'Overall Leaders' gives details of those who were either the Prime Minister or a former Prime Minister who was still in Parliament and leading the Whig Party in the House in which he sat.

== List of leaders of the Whig Party, 1830–1859 ==
Name	Portrait	Constituency/Title	Took office	Left office	Prime Minister
Earl Grey		2nd Earl Grey	22 November 1830	16 July 1834	Earl Grey 1830–34
Viscount Melbourne		2nd Viscount Melbourne	16 July 1834	23 October 1842	Viscount Melbourne 1834
Viscount Melbourne		2nd Viscount Melbourne	16 July 1834	23 October 1842	The Duke of Wellington 1834
Viscount Melbourne		2nd Viscount Melbourne	16 July 1834	23 October 1842	Sir Robert Peel 1834–35
Viscount Melbourne		2nd Viscount Melbourne	16 July 1834	23 October 1842	Viscount Melbourne 1835–41
Viscount Melbourne		2nd Viscount Melbourne	16 July 1834	23 October 1842	Sir Robert Peel 1841–46
VACANT Leader in Lords -The Marquess of Lansdowne; Leader in Commons -Lord John Russell			23 October 1842	30 June 1846	Sir Robert Peel 1841–46
Lord John Russell		City of London	30 June 1846	30 January 1855	Lord John Russell 1846–52
Lord John Russell		City of London	30 June 1846	30 January 1855	Earl of Derby 1852
Lord John Russell		City of London	30 June 1846	30 January 1855	Earl of Aberdeen 1852–55
Henry John Temple, 3rd Viscount Palmerston		Tiverton	6 February 1855	6 June 1859	Viscount Palmerston 1855–1858
Henry John Temple, 3rd Viscount Palmerston		Tiverton	6 February 1855	6 June 1859	Earl of Derby 1858–59

== Leaders of the Whig Party in the House of Commons, 1830–1859 ==
Name	Constituency	Took office	Left office
Viscount Althorp	Northamptonshire (1830–1832); South Northamptonshire (1832–1834)	March 1830	November 1834
Lord John Russell	Devonshire South (1834–1835); Stroud (1835–1841); City of London (1841–1855)	November 1834	February 1855
Henry John Temple, 3rd Viscount Palmerston	Tiverton	February 1855	June 1859

== Leaders of the Whig Party in the House of Lords, 1830–1859 ==
Name	Took office	Left office
Charles Grey, 2nd Earl Grey	November 1830	July 1834
Viscount Melbourne	July 1834	October 1842
The Marquess of Lansdowne	October 1842	February 1855
Earl Granville	February 1855	1859
