= Portrait of William Lamb =

Painting by John Hoppner

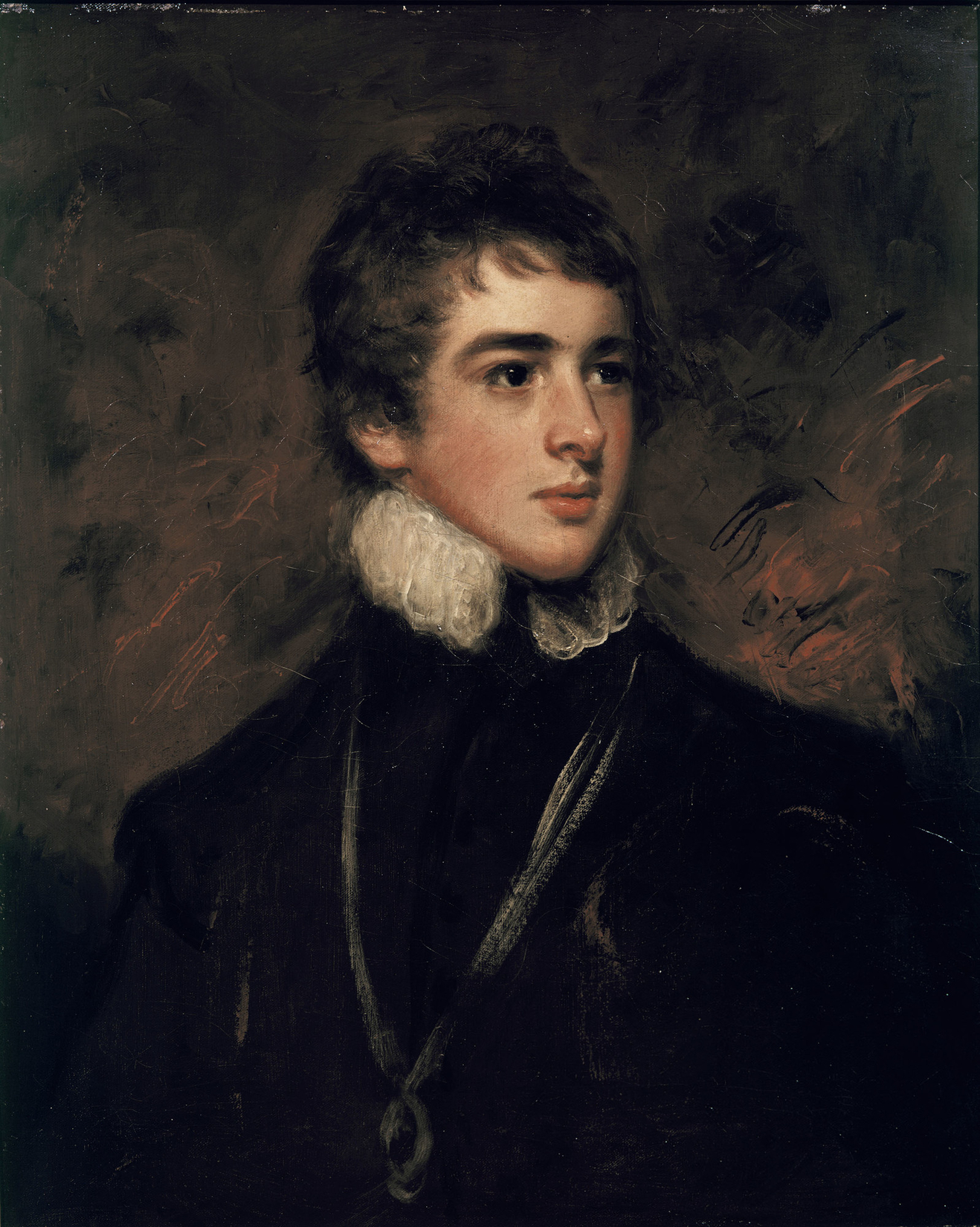
- Artist: John Hoppner
- Year: 1796
- Type: Oil on canvas, portrait
- Dimensions: 76.6 cm × 63.6 cm (30.2 in × 25.0 in)
- Location: Royal Collection

Portrait of William Lamb is an oil on canvas portrait painting by the British artist John Hoppner, from 1796. It depicts the English aristocrat and future politician William Lamb as a seventeen-year old Etonian.

== History and description ==
It was produced as part of the tradition of Eton leaving portraits, given by distinguished pupils to their tutors. Lamb's was produced by Hoppner, a fashionable portraitist of the era and rival of Thomas Lawrence, for Melbourne's tutor William Langford. He is shown in the mock Tudor dress associated with the Eton Montem festival.

The son of the Whig politician Peniston Lamb, 1st Viscount Melbourne, William would later enter politics and inherit his father's title. As Lord Melbourne went on to serve twice as Prime Minister and mentored the young Queen Victoria during the early years of her reign.

After a visit to Eton College, Victoria asked Melbourne why he was not amongst the paintings of famous leavers on display on the wall. Melbourne showed her the work which his brother had since acquired, with the intention of donating it to Eton. Victoria was so impressed by the picture which she considered "a beautiful and spirited picture though not quite finished", that she acquired it herself. During her reign it hung in the Grand Corridor of Windsor Castle and remains part of the Royal Collection.

== Bibliography ==
- Blunt, Anthony. The Pictures in the Collection of Her Majesty the Queen: The Later Italian Pictures. Phaidon, 1969.
- Ziegler, Philip. Melbourne:A Biography of William Lamb, 2nd Viscount Melbourne. Faber and Faber, 2013.

== See also ==
- Portrait of Lord Melbourne, an 1805 painting by Thomas Lawrence
