= George Lamb (politician) =

British politician and writer

The Honourable George Lamb

Member of Parliament for Westminster
- In office 1819–1820 Serving with Sir Francis Burdett
- Preceded by: Sir Samuel Romilly; Sir Francis Burdett
- Succeeded by: John Hobhouse; Sir Francis Budett
- In office 1820–1834
- Preceded by: Sir Augustus Clifford
- Succeeded by: Ebenezer Jacob

Personal details
- Born: 11 July 1784
- Died: 2 January 1834 (aged 49)

George Lamb MP (11 July 1784 – 2 January 1834) was a British politician and writer.

He was the youngest son of Elizabeth Lamb, Viscountess Melbourne and Peniston Lamb, 1st Viscount Melbourne. However, due to his mother's numerous love affairs, George's true paternity is a matter of debate. It is widely rumored that George's biological father was George IV (then the Prince of Wales), who acted as George Lamb's godfather. He was the brother of William Lamb, 2nd Viscount Melbourne, Frederick Lamb, 3rd Viscount Melbourne, and Emily Lamb, Countess Cowper.

== Life ==
He was educated at Eton College and Trinity College, Cambridge, where he graduated MA in 1805.

On 17 May 1809, he married Caroline Rosalie Adelaide St. Jules, the illegitimate daughter of William Cavendish, 5th Duke of Devonshire, by his mistress (and eventual second wife) Lady Elizabeth Foster. In 1805 his brother William had married Caroline's cousin Lady Caroline Ponsonby, whose affair with the poet Lord Byron led her to describe him as "mad, bad, and dangerous to know".

The Lambs had no children and it was speculated that the marriage was never consummated. George would neglect Caroline St. Jules by retiring to bed early to avoid sleeping with his wife. George found his wife to be a distraction from his theatre/literary career. Their marriage was almost in shambles. In 1816, Caroline St. Jules had an affair with Henry Brougham. In addition, Caroline St. Jules felt trapped in a marriage where her husband was neglectful and a drunk.

Caroline St. Jules would confess her marital problems to her mother, Lady Elizabeth Foster. Lady Elizabeth Foster could not see Caroline St. Jules’ and George Lamb's marital problems in any positive light. Lady Elizabeth Foster was disappointed in George's treatment of Caroline and believed him to be "some kind of monster."

Yet, Caroline St. Jules and George Lamb's marriage seemed to work out as time went on. Eventually, Caroline St. Jules and Henry Brougham ended their affair. Caroline reconciled with her husband, and they stayed together until George Lamb's death in 1834. Even though Caroline St. Jules outlived George Lamb by almost 28 years, she never remarried. Caroline St. Jules died in 1862.

== Career ==
George Lamb became a barrister at Lincoln's Inn, and was Member of Parliament for Westminster from March 1819 to March 1820, and for Dungarvan from 1822 until his death. He served in Earl Grey's administration as Under-Secretary of State for the Home Department from 1830 until his death.

George Lamb's comic opera Whistle for it was produced in 1807, and his adaptations of Timon of Athens in 1816. His most important work, a translation of the poems of Catullus, was published in 1821.

Parliament of the United Kingdom
Preceded by Francis Burdett; Samuel Romilly	Member of Parliament for Westminster; 1819–1820; With: Francis Burdett	Succeeded by Francis Burdett; John Cam Hobhouse
Preceded by Augustus Clifford	Member of Parliament for Dungarvan; 1820–1834	Succeeded by Ebenezer Jacob
