= Valentine Snow =

- Born: c. 1700
- Died: December 1770
- Occupations: Trumpeter, Primary trumpeter of England
- Instrument: Trumpet

Valentine Snow (c. 1700 – December 1770) was the trumpeter for George Frideric Handel.

In 1745 Snow and his wife Mary had a daughter named Sophia when he was the sergeant-trumpeter to George II. She was trained for a musical career and after she eloped she found fame as Sophia Baddeley.

Snow succeeded John Shore as the primary trumpeter of England during the mid-to-late 18th century, which automatically made him the most respected trumpeter in the country. Many of the trumpet parts in the music of Handel were written specifically for him.
