= Bedchamber crisis =

British political crisis of 1839

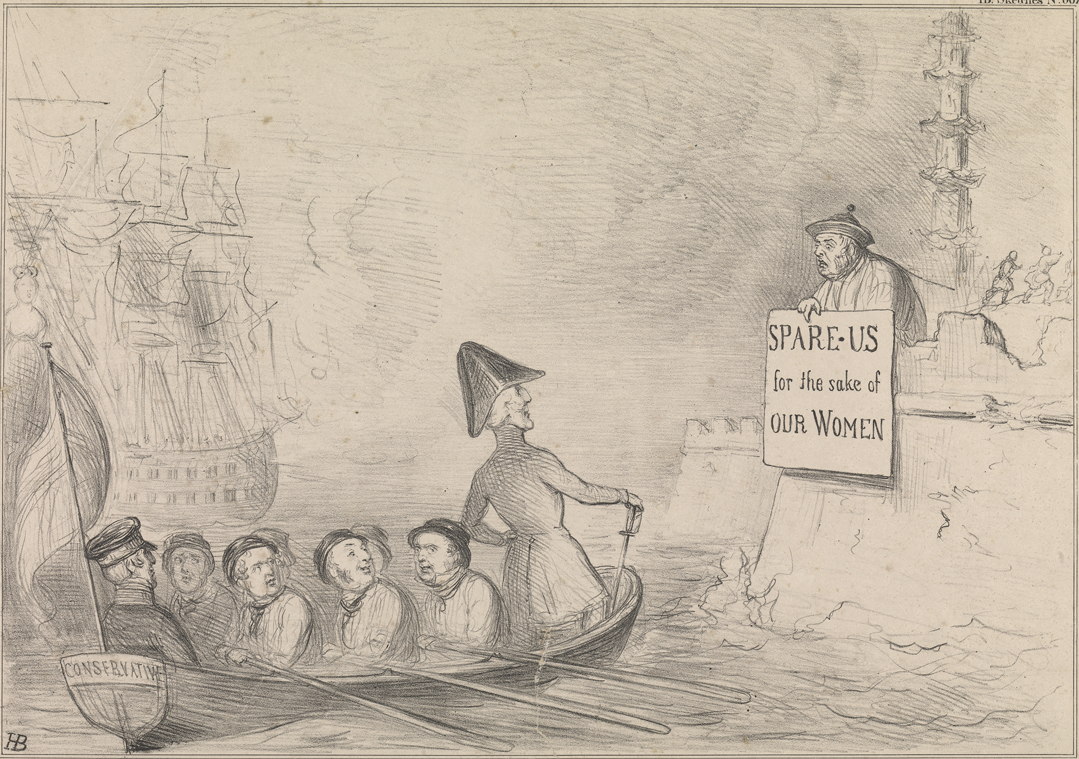
Satire of the crisis by John Doyle, 31 December 1840

The Bedchamber crisis was a constitutional crisis that occurred in the United Kingdom between 1839 and 1841. It began after the 2nd Viscount Melbourne, a leading Whig politician, declared his intention to resign as Prime Minister of the United Kingdom after a government bill passed by a very narrow margin of only five votes in the House of Commons. The crisis occurred very early in the reign of Queen Victoria and involved her first change of government. She was fond of Lord Melbourne, and resisted the requests of his rival, Robert Peel, to replace some of her ladies-in-waiting, who were primarily from Whig-aligned families, with Conservative substitutes as a condition for forming a government. Following a few false moves toward an alternative Conservative prime minister and government, Melbourne was reinstated until the 1841 election, after which Peel was appointed Prime Minister and Victoria conceded to the replacement of six of her ladies-in-waiting.

== Overview ==
After the Whig government bill passed by a narrow margin on 7 May 1839, the prime minister, William Lamb, 2nd Viscount Melbourne, declared his intention to resign. The distraught young Queen Victoria, whose political sympathies were with the Whigs, first asked the Duke of Wellington, a former Tory prime minister, to form a new government, but he politely declined. She then reluctantly invited Conservative leader Robert Peel to form a government. Peel realised that such a government would hold a minority in the House of Commons and would be structurally weak, possibly damaging his future political career.

Peel accepted the invitation on the condition that Victoria dismiss some of her ladies of the bedchamber, many of whom were wives or relatives of leading Whig politicians. She refused the request, considering her ladies as close friends, not as objects of political bargaining. Peel, therefore, refused to become prime minister and Melbourne was eventually persuaded to stay on as prime minister.

After Victoria's marriage to Prince Albert in 1840, she relied less on her ladies for companionship. In the 1841 general election Peel's Conservatives gained a majority and Victoria appointed Peel as the new prime minister, a change of government for which Melbourne had meanwhile been preparing her. Accepting "the wise advice of the democratically minded Prince Albert", Victoria replaced three of her Whig ladies with Conservatives.

== Aftermath ==
At the time of the crisis Victoria was not yet twenty years old and had been on the throne less than two years. She was dismayed at the thought of losing her first, and so far only, Prime Minister, the avuncular Melbourne, a wise and kindly father-figure to her in the first years of her reign—her own father, the Duke of Kent, had died when she was an infant. Victoria also mistakenly assumed that Peel wanted to replace all of her ladies—her closest friends and companions at court—when in fact Peel wished to replace only six of the twenty-five ladies, but failed to make his intentions clear to the Queen.

Late in life Victoria regretted her youthful intransigence, writing to her private secretary, Arthur Bigge: "I was very young then, and perhaps I should act differently if it was all to be done again."

== Fictional portrayals ==
The Bedchamber crisis appears in both Coningsby (1844) and Sybil (1845), novels written by the future prime minister Benjamin Disraeli; in the former, Disraeli describes Peel's request as 'open insurrection against the prerogatives of the English Monarchy'. The crisis is depicted in the 2009 film The Young Victoria and the 2019 television-drama series Victoria.
