= Peniston Lamb (1770–1805) =

British politician

The Honourable Peniston Lamb MP
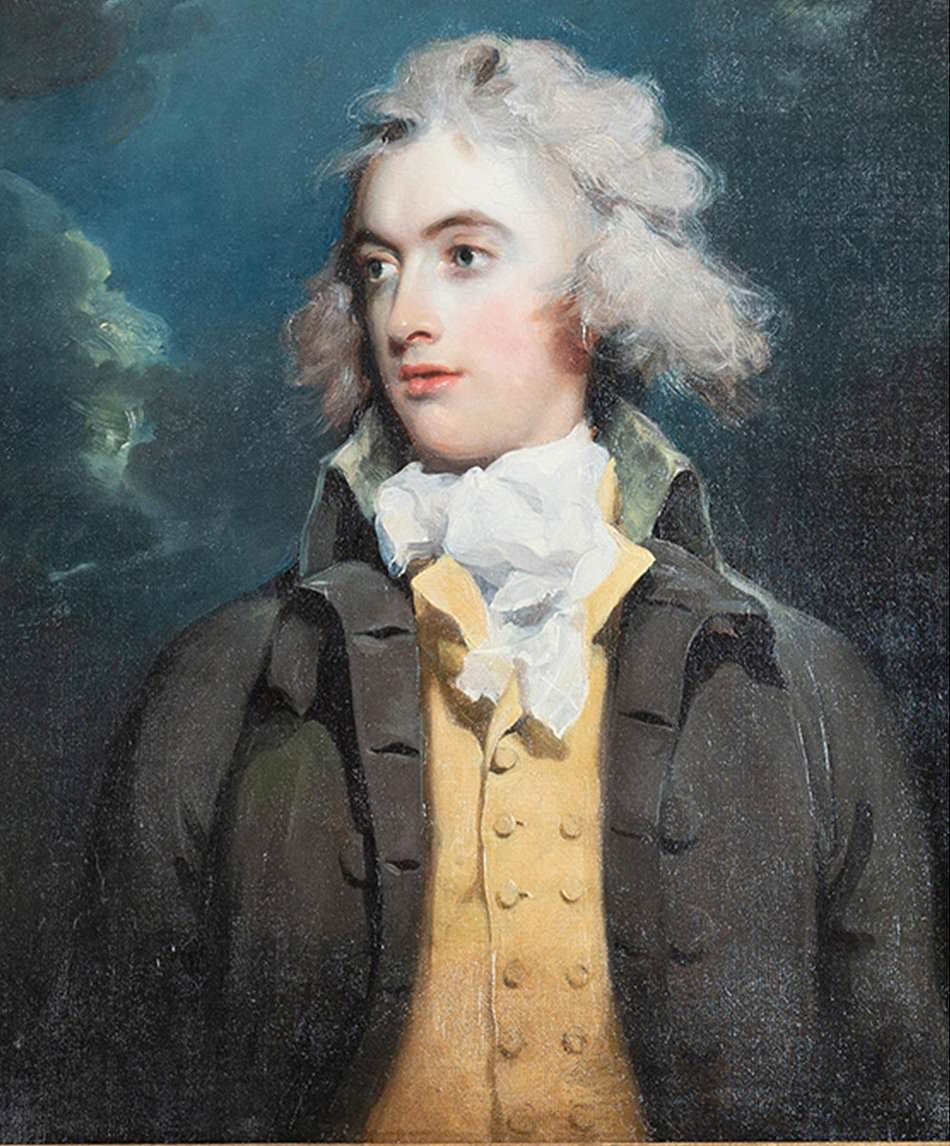
- Portrait of Lamb by Thomas Lawrence

Member of Parliament for Hertfordshire
- In office 1802–1805
- Preceded by: William Baker
- Succeeded by: William Baker

Member of Parliament for Newport
- In office 1793–1796
- Preceded by: Viscount Melbourne
- Succeeded by: Edward Rushworth

Personal details
- Born: 3 May 1770 London, Middlesex
- Died: 24 January 1804 (aged 33) Brighton, Sussex
- Party: Pittite Tory (after 1793); Alarmist Whig (c. 1793); Foxite Whig (before 1793)
- Domestic partner: Sophia Musters
- Children: 1
- Parent(s): Peniston Lamb, 1st Viscount Melbourne; Elizabeth Milbanke
- Education: Eton College
- Occupation: Politician

The Honourable Peniston Lamb (3 May 1770 – 24 January 1805) was a British politician.

== Background ==
Lamb was the eldest son of Peniston Lamb, 1st Viscount Melbourne, and Elizabeth, daughter of Sir Ralph Milbanke, 5th Baronet. Prime Minister William Lamb, 2nd Viscount Melbourne, Frederick Lamb, 3rd Viscount Melbourne and the Hon. George Lamb were his younger brothers.

== Political career ==
Lamb was elected member of parliament (MP) for Newport in 1793, and held the seat until 1796. He was elected as MP for Hertfordshire in 1802, a seat he held until his death three years later.

== Personal life ==
Peniston Lamb had an affair with Mrs Sophia Musters née Heywood (1758–1819).

Lamb died of tuberculosis in January 1805, aged 34, unmarried. He spent his last days at the Royal Pavilion in Brighton. Lamb had an illegitimate son, also Peniston, born in 1801, who was acknowledged and supported by his grandfather, the 1st Viscount, and was employed in the East India Company through the intercessions of his grandfather.

Parliament of Great Britain
Preceded by The Viscount Melbourne; The Viscount Palmerston	Member of Parliament for Newport, Isle of Wight; 1793 – 1796; With: The Viscount Palmerston	Succeeded by Edward Rushworth; Jervoise Clarke Jervoise
Parliament of the United Kingdom
Preceded by William Plumer; The Viscount Grimston	Member of Parliament for Hertfordshire; 1802–1805; With: William Plumer	Succeeded by William Plumer; William Baker
