= Viscount Melbourne =

Title in the Peerage of Ireland

Viscountcy Melbourne
- Arms of Viscounts Melbourne Blazon Arms: Sable, on a fess erminois between three cinquefoils argent, two mullets of the field. Crest: A demi-lion rampant gules holding between the paws a mullet sable. Supporters: Two lions gules collared and chained or, on each collar two mullets sable. Motto: Virtute et fide (By bravery and faith).
- Creation date: 11 January 1781; 245 years ago
- Created by: George III
- Peerage: Peerage of Ireland
- First holder: Peniston Lamb, 1st Viscount Melbourne
- Last holder: Frederick Lamb, 3rd Viscount Melbourne
- Remainder to: Heirs male of the first viscount's body lawfully begotten
- Subsidiary titles: Baron Melbourne; Baron Beauvale
- Extinction date: January 29, 1853; 173 years ago
- Former seats: Melbourne Hall; Brocket Hall
- Motto: Virtute et fide ("By virtue and faith")

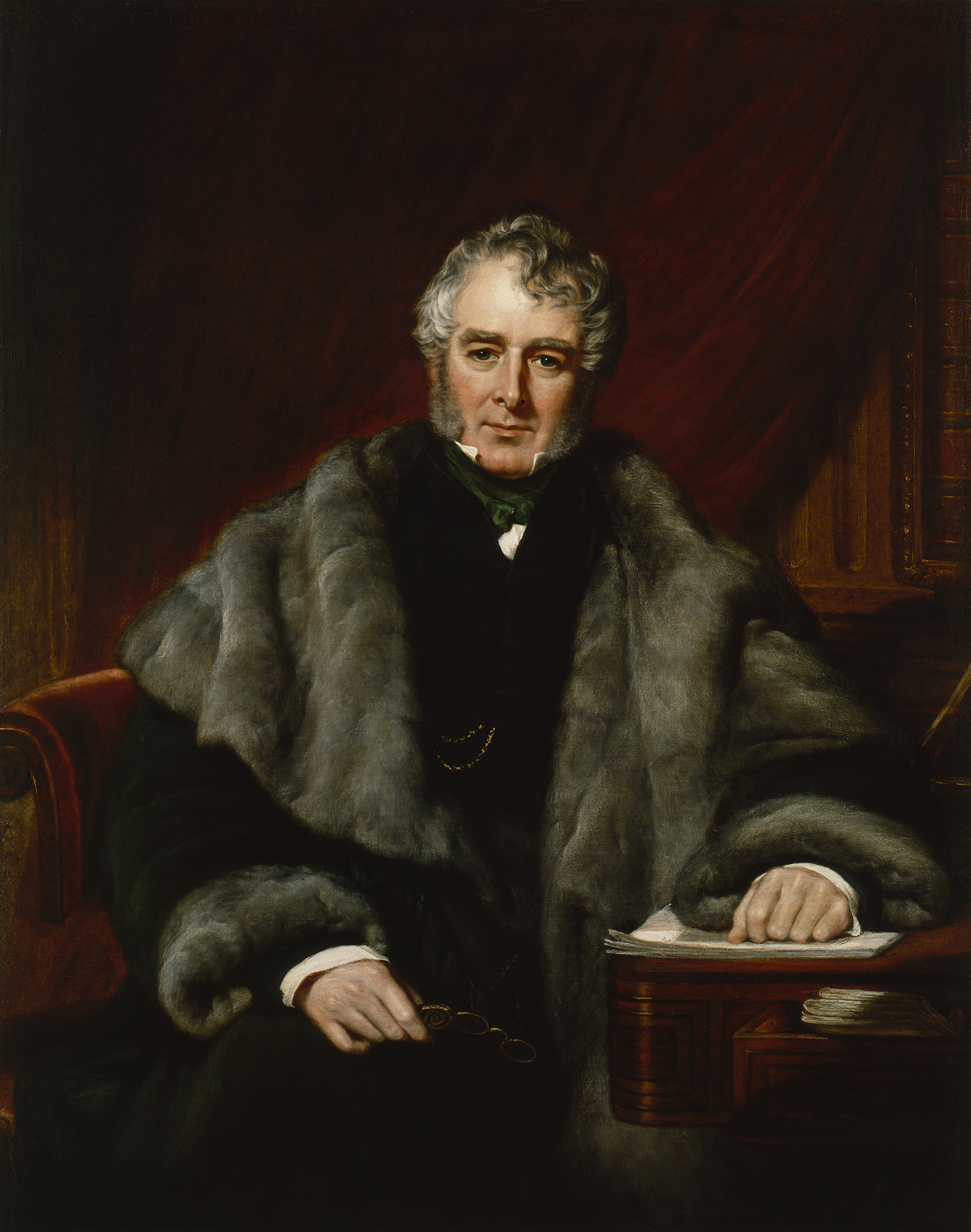
Portrait of Lord Melbourne by John Partridge, 1844.

Viscount Melbourne, of Kilmore in the County of Cavan, was a title in the Peerage of Ireland held by the Lamb family.

This family descended from Matthew Lamb, who represented Stockbridge and Peterborough in the House of Commons. In 1755 he was created a baronet, of Brocket Hall in the County of Hertford, in the Baronetage of Great Britain. He married Charlotte, daughter of Thomas Coke, through which marriage Melbourne Hall in Derbyshire came into the Lamb family.

He was succeeded by his son, Peniston, the second Baronet, who sat as Member of Parliament for Ludgershall, Malmesbury and Newport, Isle of Wight, and who, in 1770, was raised to the Peerage of Ireland as Baron Melbourne, of Kilmore in the County of Cavan. In 1781, he was created Viscount Melbourne, of Kilmore in the County of Cavan, also in the Peerage of Ireland. In 1815, he was made Baron Melbourne, of Melbourne in the County of Derby, in the Peerage of the United Kingdom.

He was succeeded by his son, William Lamb, 2nd Viscount Melbourne, who was a noted Whig politician and served as Prime Minister of the United Kingdom in 1834 and 1835–1841. He was Queen Victoria's first Prime Minister, and she greatly relied upon his wisdom and experience in her early days on the throne, to the point where Melbourne's political foes complained that he had enthralled her. Since Melbourne's mother had numerous lovers, it is very doubtful that he was in fact the first Viscount's son.

On his death, the titles passed to his younger brother, the third Viscount, who was a prominent diplomat. In 1839, nine years before he succeeded his brother, he was raised to the Peerage of the United Kingdom in his own right as Baron Beauvale, of Beauvale in the County of Nottingham. All five titles became extinct on his death in 1853.

The Honourable George Lamb, fourth and youngest son of the first Viscount, was also a politician.

== Lamb baronets, of Brocket Hall (1755) ==
- Sir Matthew Lamb, 1st Baronet (1705–1768)
- Sir Peniston Lamb, 2nd Baronet (1745–1828)

== Viscounts Melbourne (1781) ==
- Peniston Lamb, 1st Viscount Melbourne (1748–1828)
  - Hon. Peniston Lamb (1770–1805)
- William Lamb, 2nd Viscount Melbourne (1779–1848)
  - Hon. George Augustus Frederick Lamb (1807–1836)
- Frederick James Lamb, 3rd Viscount Melbourne (1782–1853)

Baronetage of Great Britain
Preceded by Knollys baronets	Lamb baronets of Brocket Hall; 17 January 1755	Succeeded by Winnington baronets
