= Sophia Baddeley =

British actress

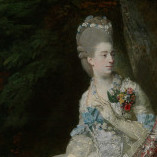
- Sophia Baddeley in a detail from a painting by Johan Zoffany
- Born: Sophia Snow; 1745; London, England
- Died: July 1786 (aged 40–41)
- Occupation: actor
- Known for: Courtesan
- Spouse: Robert Baddeley

Sophia Baddeley born Sophia Snow (1745 – July 1786) was an English actress, singer and courtesan.

== Early life, musical career ==
She was born in London, the daughter of Mary and Valentine Snow, who was the sergeant-trumpeter to George II. As a child, she was trained by her father for a future musical career.

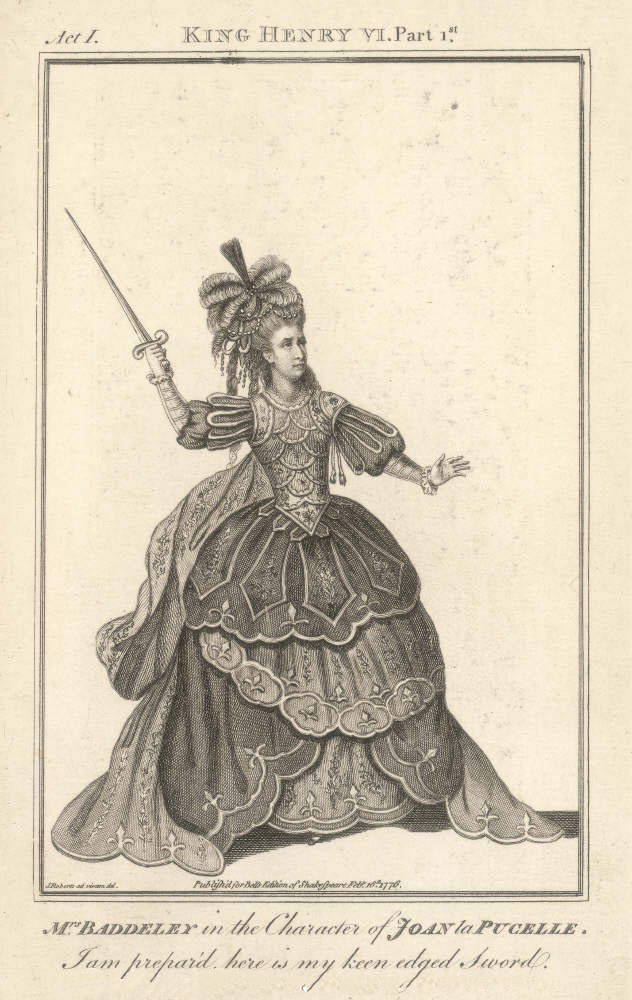
Mrs Baddeley in the role of Joan of Arc

At the age of eighteen she eloped with the actor Robert Baddeley, then on the stage at Drury Lane. She made her first appearance on 27 April 1765, as Ophelia in Hamlet. She also played Cordelia in King Lear, Imogen in Cymbeline and later Olivia in Twelfth Night. In 1769, she joined David Garrick's theatre company when he staged the Stratford Jubilee. In that year she appeared in a Royal Command Performance of The Clandestine Marriage on 12 October. She appeared as Fanny Sterling with Robert as Canton and Thomas King as Lord Ogleby. These three were painted in that role by Johan Zoffany and the painting is now owned by the Garrick Club.

Baddeley was noted as a talented singer rather than as an actress, she obtained engagements at Ranelagh and Vauxhall Gardens to public acclaim.

== Life as a courtesan ==
At the height of her success and after separating from her husband in 1770, she discovered that she could sustain herself financially by finding wealthy benefactors and establishing herself as a courtesan to them. Probably her best-known lover was Peniston Lamb, 1st Viscount Melbourne. She was famous for her beauty, and was also noted for her extravagant lifestyle. Her overspending and ultimate failure in managing her finances eventually obliged her to take refuge from her creditors in Dublin, Ireland and later Edinburgh, Scotland. Her benefactors gone, and her own health in decline, she made her last appearance on the stage in Edinburgh in 1785.

She died of consumption aged 41 in July of 1786, at her lodging at Shakespeare Square in Edinburgh at the east end of Princes Street.
