= Peniston Lamb, 1st Viscount Melbourne =

British politician

The Right Honourable The Viscount Melbourne
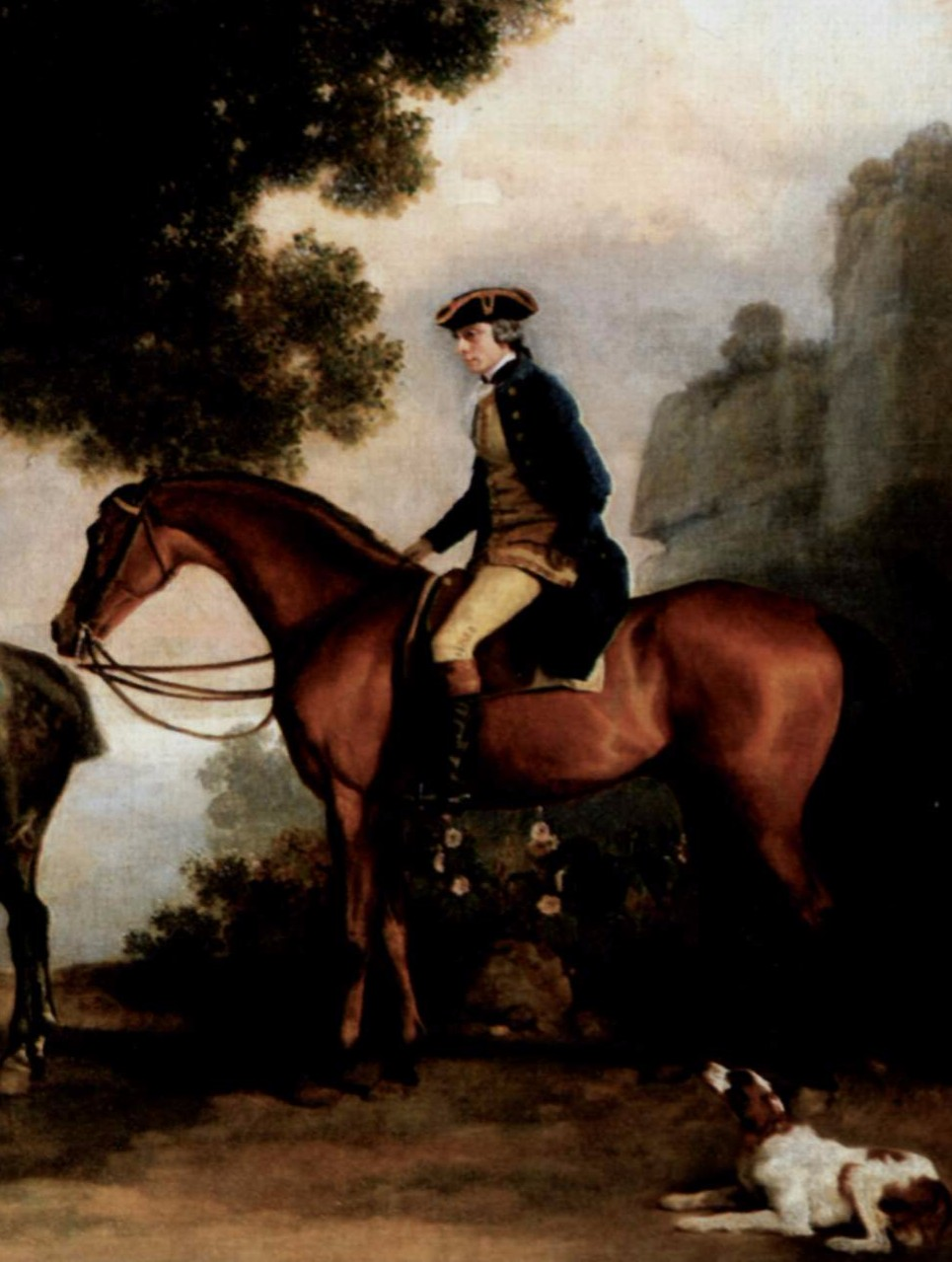
- Detail from The Milbanke and Melbourne Families by George Stubbs, 1769

Personal details
- Born: 29 January 1745
- Died: 22 July 1828 (aged 83)
- Spouse: Elizabeth Milbanke
- Children: Peniston Lamb; William Lamb, 2nd Viscount Melbourne; Frederick Lamb, 3rd Viscount Melbourne; George Lamb; Emily Lamb, Countess Cowper and Viscountess Palmerston
- Parent: Sir Matthew Lamb, 1st Baronet (father)

Peniston Lamb, 1st Viscount Melbourne (29 January 1745 – 22 July 1828), known as Sir Peniston Lamb, 2nd Baronet, from 1768 to 1770, was a British politician who sat in the House of Commons from 1768 to 1793. He was the father of Prime Minister William Lamb, 2nd Viscount Melbourne.

== Early life ==
Lamb was the son of Sir Matthew Lamb, 1st Baronet, and his wife Charlotte (née Coke). He was educated at Eton College from 1755 to 1762 and entered Lincoln's Inn in 1769. He succeeded in the baronetcy on his father's death on 6 November 1768 and inherited Melbourne Hall in Derbyshire. He married Elizabeth Milbanke (1751–1818), daughter of Sir Ralph Milbanke, 5th Baronet, on 13 April 1769. She was a young woman of great beauty, intelligence and strong character, who quickly came to dominate her husband completely, and steered them into the centre of polite society. In 1770 he began, as Melbourne House, what is now The Albany in London.

== Political career ==
At the 1768 general election Lamb was returned unopposed as Member of Parliament for Ludgershall. In 1770 he was raised to the Peerage of Ireland as Baron Melbourne, of Kilmore in the County of Cavan, but as it was an Irish peerage he was allowed to remain in the House of Commons. He was returned unopposed again as MP for Ludgershall at the elections in 1774 and 1780. In 1781 he was created Viscount Melbourne, of Kilmore in the County of Cavan, also in the Peerage of Ireland. He was appointed Gentleman of the Bedchamber to the Prince of Wales in 1783 and held the position until 1796. At the 1784 general election he stood for Malmesbury and was again returned unopposed. He switched again in 1790 and was returned unopposed at Newport, Isle of Wight. He resigned his seat in 1793 for his son Peniston.

== Later life ==
Lord Melbourne became Lord of the Bedchamber in 1812. In 1815 he was even further honoured when he was made Baron Melbourne, of Melbourne in the County of Derby, in the Peerage of the United Kingdom, which gave him an automatic seat in the House of Lords. He died on 22 July 1828, aged 83 and was succeeded in his titles by his son William.

== Family ==
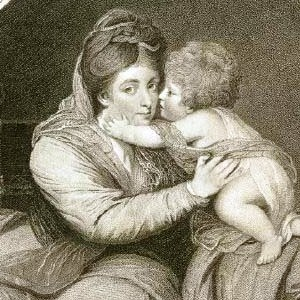
Lady Melbourne with her eldest son

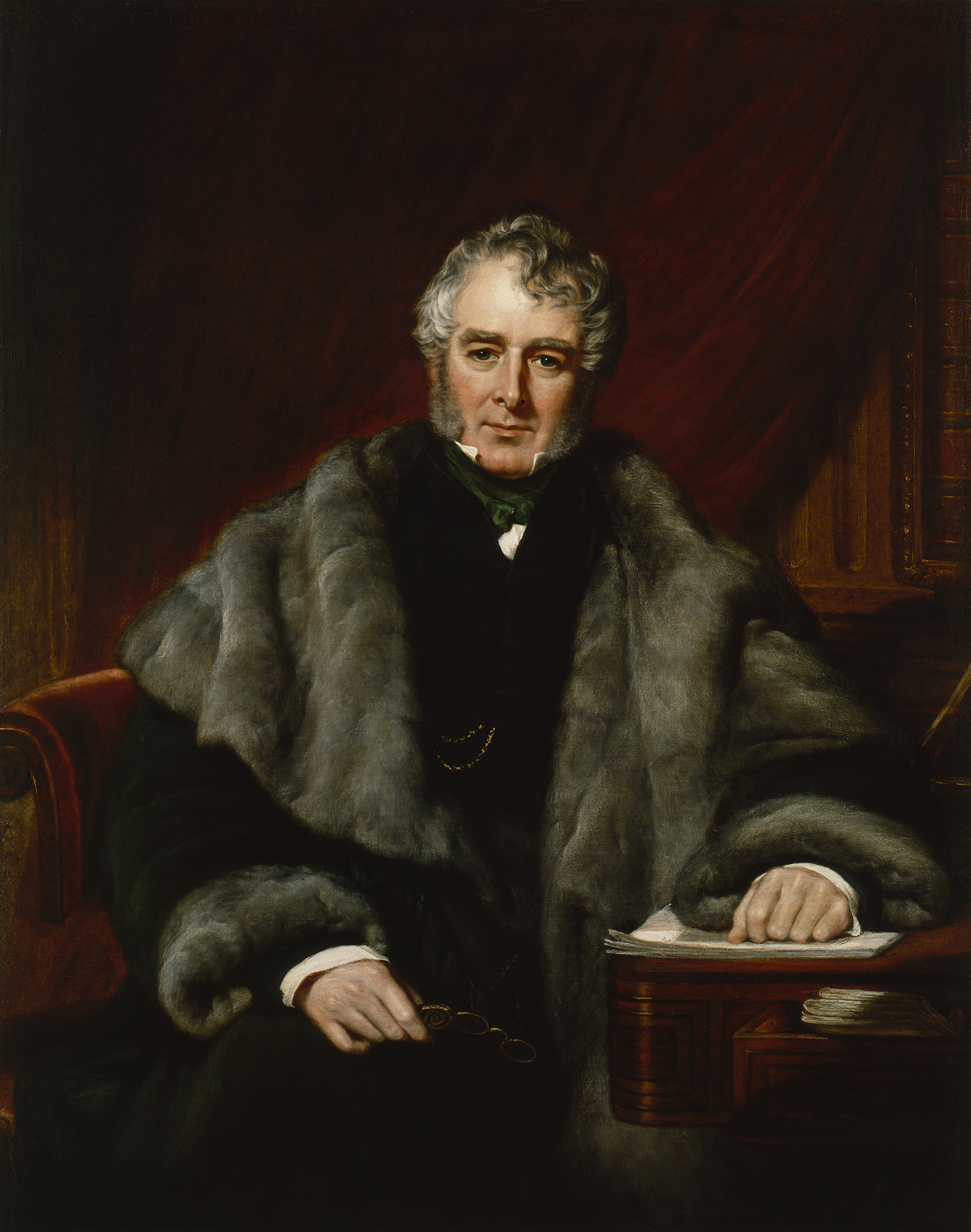
Portrait of Lord Melbourne by John Partridge.

Melbourne and his wife had seven children.

- Hon. Peniston Lamb (3 May 1770 – 24 January 1805)
- Elizabeth Lamb (25 October 1777 – 28 November 1844)
- William Lamb (15 March 1779 – 24 November 1848), 2nd Viscount Melbourne
- Frederick James Lamb (17 April 1782 – 29 January 1853), 3rd Viscount Melbourne
- Hon. George Lamb (11 July 1784 – 2 January 1834)
- Emily Lamb, Countess Cowper (1787–1869)
- Harriet Lamb (1789-1803)

Only the first-born son can be definitively attributed to Lord Melbourne due to his wife's many affairs. George is reputed to be the son of George IV, with William and Emily allegedly fathered by George Wyndham, 3rd Earl of Egremont.

Whether Melbourne was made unhappy by his wife's affairs is unclear: he was a mild, easygoing and rather stupid man who avoided trouble, and invariably deferred to his wife, who was by far the stronger and more intelligent partner in the marriage. Their one serious quarrel was caused by the death of their eldest son Pen (who was undoubtedly Melbourne's child); he angrily refused to make the same allowance to William (who was almost certainly not Melbourne's child) as he had given Pen, suggesting that he felt some degree of resentment of his wife's conduct. Lady Melbourne, on her side, tolerated his affair with the courtesan Sophia Baddeley. Nathaniel Wraxall wrote of Melbourne that he was "principally known by the distinguished place that he occupies in the annals of meretricious pleasure, the memoirs of Mrs. Bellamy or Mrs. Baddeley, the sirens and courtesans of a former age".

Melbourne's children regarded him with what has been described as "kindly contempt": his daughter Emily said that he was always going wrong and they were always having to put him right, and that although he was not a heavy drinker, he always seemed drunk.

== Arms ==
Coat of arms of Peniston Lamb, 1st Viscount Melbourne
Crest A demi-lion rampant gules holding between the paws a mullet sable. Escutcheon Sable, on a fess erminois between three cinquefoils argent, two mullets of the field. Supporters Two lions gules collared and chained or, on each collar two mullets sable. Motto Virtute et fide (By bravery and faith).

== Sources ==
- Kidd, Charles, Williamson, David (editors). Debrett's Peerage and Baronetage (1990 edition). New York: St Martin's Press, 1990,

Parliament of Great Britain
Preceded by Thomas Whately; John Paterson	Member of Parliament for Ludgershall; 1768–1784; With: Lord Garlies 1768–1774; Whitshed Keene 1774; Lord George Gordon 1774–1780; George Selwyn 1780–1784	Succeeded by George Selwyn; Nathaniel Wraxall
Preceded by Viscount Fairford; John Calvert	Member of Parliament for Malmesbury; 1784–1790; With: Viscount Maitland 1784–1790; Paul Benfield 1790	Succeeded by Paul Benfield; Benjamin Bond-Hopkins
Preceded by Edward Rushworth; George Byng	Member of Parliament for Newport (Isle of Wight); 1790–1793; With: Viscount Palmerston	Succeeded by Viscount Palmerston; Peniston Lamb
Peerage of Ireland
New creation	Viscount Melbourne; 1781–1828	Succeeded by William Lamb
New creation	Baron Melbourne; 1770–1828	Succeeded by William Lamb
Peerage of the United Kingdom
New creation	Baron Melbourne; 1815–1828	Succeeded by William Lamb
Baronetage of Great Britain
Preceded by Matthew Lamb	Baronet (of Brocket Hall); 1768–1828	Succeeded by William Lamb
