= William Lamb, 2nd Viscount Melbourne =

Prime Minister of the United Kingdom (1834; 1835–1841)

The Right Honourable The Viscount Melbourne PC PC (Ire) FRS
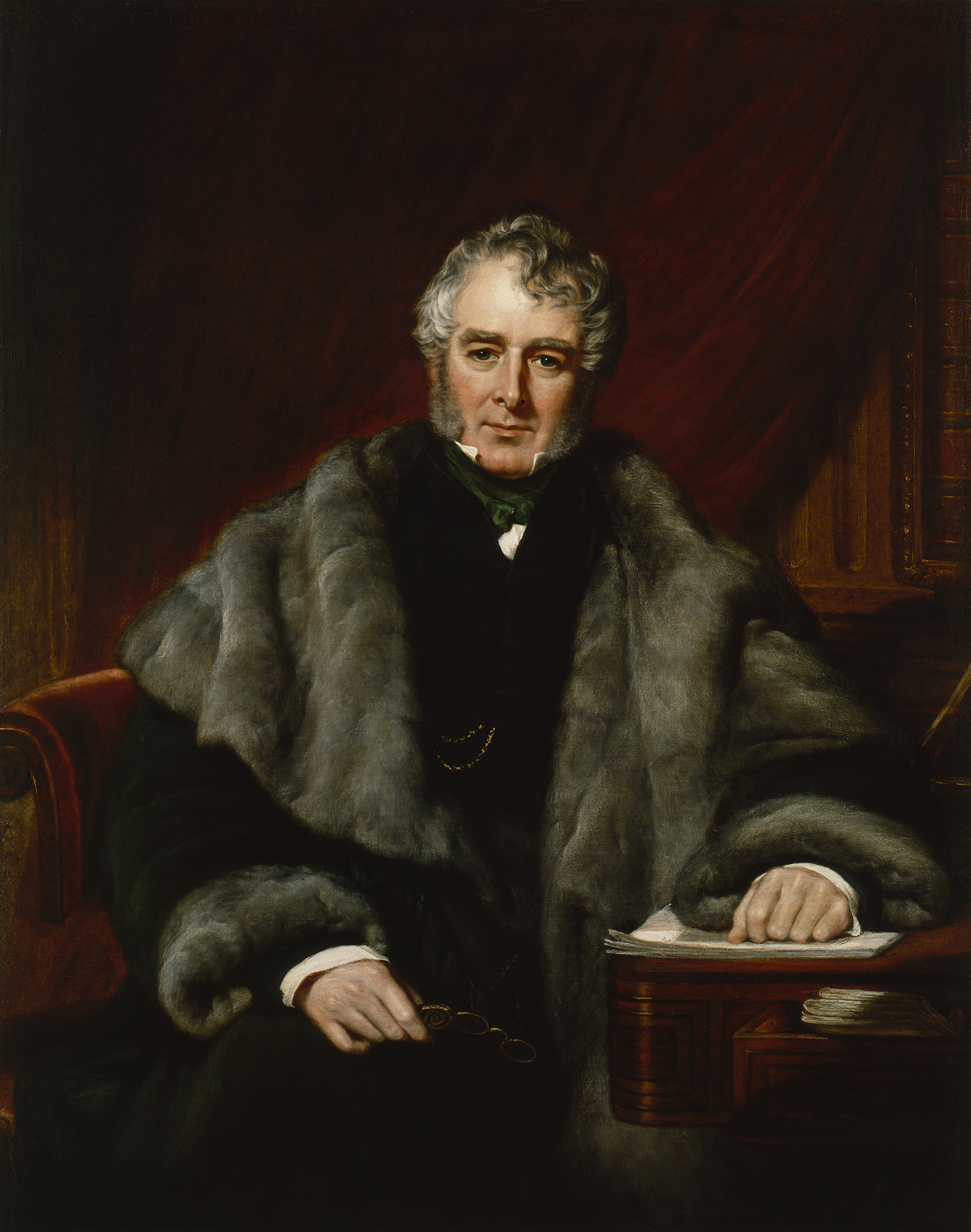
- Portrait of Lord Melbourne (1844)

Prime Minister of the United Kingdom
- In office 18 April 1835 – 30 August 1841
- Monarchs: William IV; Victoria
- Preceded by: Robert Peel
- Succeeded by: Robert Peel
- In office 16 July 1834 – 14 November 1834
- Monarch: William IV
- Preceded by: The Earl Grey
- Succeeded by: The Duke of Wellington

Leader of the Opposition
- In office 30 August 1841 – October 1842
- Preceded by: Robert Peel
- Succeeded by: Lord John Russell
- In office 14 November 1834 – 18 April 1835
- Preceded by: The Duke of Wellington
- Succeeded by: Robert Peel

Leader of the House of Lords
- In office 18 April 1835 – 30 August 1841
- Preceded by: The Duke of Wellington
- Succeeded by: The Duke of Wellington
- In office 16 July 1834 – 14 November 1834
- Preceded by: The Earl Grey
- Succeeded by: The Duke of Wellington

Home Secretary
- In office 22 November 1830 – 16 July 1834
- Prime Minister: The Earl Grey
- Preceded by: Robert Peel
- Succeeded by: The Viscount Duncannon

Chief Secretary for Ireland
- In office 29 April 1827 – 21 June 1828
- Preceded by: Henry Goulburn
- Succeeded by: Lord Francis Leveson-Gower

Personal details
- Born: William Lamb; 15 March 1779 London, England
- Died: 24 November 1848 (aged 69) Brocket Hall, Lemsford, Hertfordshire, England
- Party: Whig
- Spouse: Lady Caroline Ponsonby (m. 1805; died 1828)
- Children: 3
- Parents: Peniston Lamb, 1st Viscount Melbourne; Elizabeth Milbanke
- Education: Trinity College, Cambridge; University of Glasgow

William Lamb, 2nd Viscount Melbourne (15 March 1779 – 24 November 1848), was a British Whig statesman who twice served as Prime Minister of the United Kingdom, first in 1834 and again from 1835 to 1841. He also held senior cabinet roles including Home Secretary (1830–1834) and Chief Secretary for Ireland (1827–1828), and led the House of Lords and the Opposition during key transitions in the early Victorian era.

Melbourne's first premiership ended when he was dismissed by King William IV in November 1834—the last time a British monarch removed a sitting prime minister. He returned to office five months later and remained in power for six years, guiding Queen Victoria through her early reign and acting as a trusted advisor during her political initiation.

His tenure was marked by personal influence rather than legislative innovation. Though not associated with major reforms or foreign conflicts, Melbourne played a central role in the Bedchamber Crisis and other court-related controversies. His legacy remains closely tied to his mentorship of Victoria and the stabilisation of Whig leadership during a politically volatile period.

== Early life ==
William Lamb was born on 15 March 1779 in London, England, into an aristocratic Whig family. He was the son of Peniston Lamb and Elizabeth Lamb (née Milbanke). His paternity was questioned, being attributed to George Wyndham, 3rd Earl of Egremont, to whom it was considered he bore a considerable resemblance, and at whose residence, Petworth House in Petworth, West Sussex, he was a visitor till Egremont's death in 1837. Lamb was called to Egremont's bedside when Egremont was dying, but, nevertheless, stated that Egremont being his father was "all a lie".

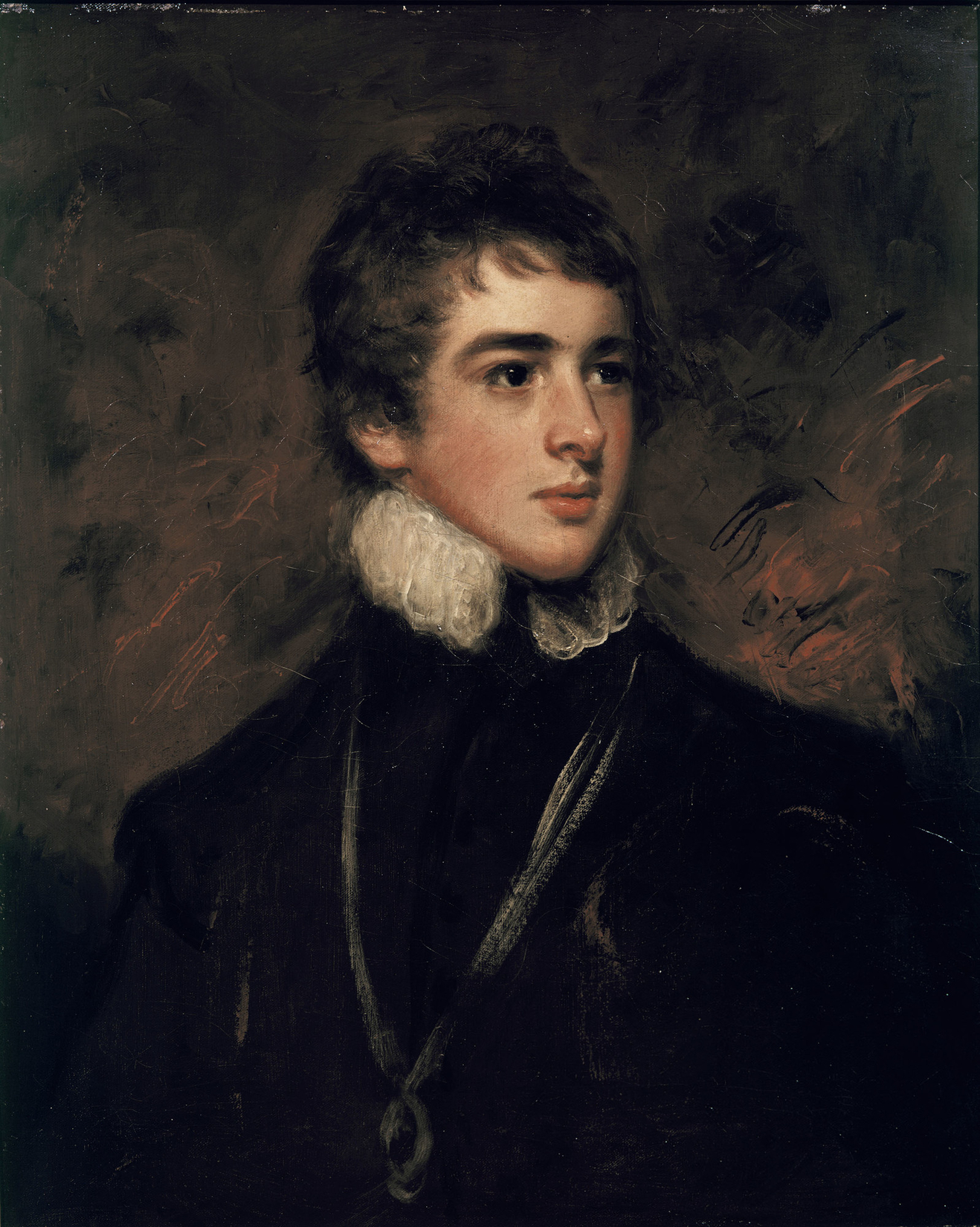
Portrait of William Lamb by John Hoppner, 1796

Lamb was educated at Eton College, then at Trinity College, Cambridge, where he was admitted in 1796 and graduated a Master of Arts in 1799, and finally at the University of Glasgow (1799–1801), where he was a resident pupil of Professor John Millar alongside his younger brother Frederick Lamb.

Admitted to Lincoln's Inn in 1797, Lamb was called to the bar in 1804. Against the background of the Napoleonic Wars, Lamb served at home as Captain (1803) and Major (1804) in the Hertfordshire Volunteer Infantry.

Lamb succeeded his elder brother Peniston as heir to his father's title in 1805 (and as captain of the Midland Troop, Hertfordshire Yeomanry, when he resigned his commission in the Volunteer Infantry) and married Lady Caroline Ponsonby, an Anglo-Irish aristocrat. After two miscarriages and a stillborn child, she gave birth to George Augustus Frederick in 1807 and was devoted to him. George was epileptic and mentally handicapped, requiring significant medical care. He died in 1836. In 1809 they had a daughter. She was born prematurely and lived only one day.

== Early political career: 1806–1830 ==
In January 1806 Lamb was elected to the British House of Commons for the Whigs as the member of parliament (MP) for Leominster. For the election in 1806 he moved to the seat of Haddington Burghs, and for the 1807 election he successfully stood for Portarlington (a seat he held until 1812).

Lamb first came to general notice for reasons he would rather have avoided: his wife had a public affair with the poet Lord Byron – she coined the famous characterisation of Byron as "mad, bad and dangerous to know". The resulting scandal was the talk of Britain in 1812.

Lady Caroline published a Gothic novel, Glenarvon, in 1816; this portrayed both the marriage and her affair with Byron in a lurid fashion, which caused William even greater embarrassment, while the spiteful caricatures of leading society figures made them several influential enemies. Eventually the two were reconciled, and, though they separated in 1825, her death in 1828 affected him considerably.

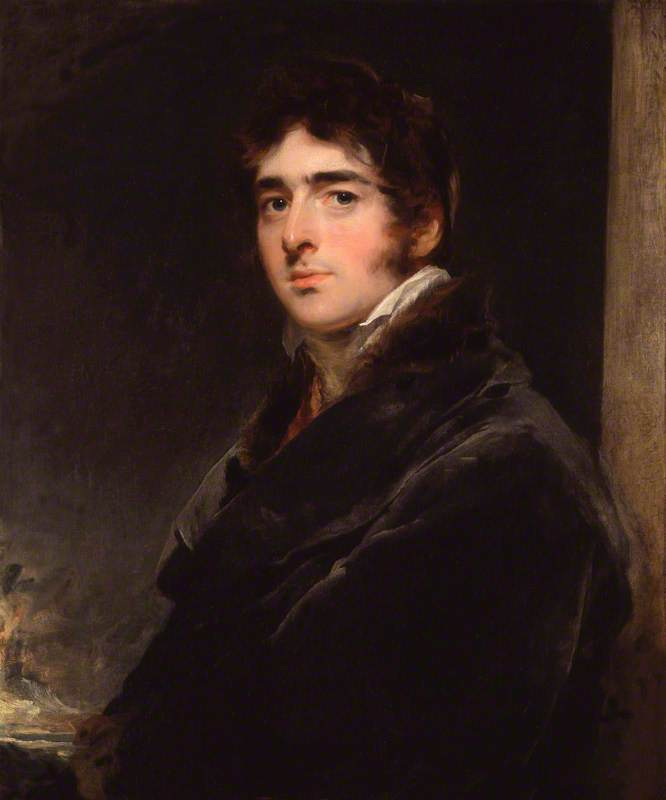
Portrait of Lord Melbourne by Thomas Lawrence, c. 1805

In 1816 Lamb was returned for Peterborough by the Whig grandee Lord Fitzwilliam. He told Lord Holland that he was committed to the Whig principles of the Glorious Revolution but not to "a heap of modern additions, interpolations, facts and fictions". He, therefore, spoke against parliamentary reform, and voted for the suspension of habeas corpus in 1817 when sedition was rife.

Lamb's hallmark was finding the middle ground. Although a Whig, he accepted the post of Chief Secretary for Ireland in the moderate Tory governments of George Canning and Lord Goderich on 29 April 1827. Upon the death of his father in 1828 and his becoming the 2nd Viscount Melbourne, of Kilmore in the County of Cavan, he moved to the House of Lords. He had spent 22 years in the Commons, largely as a backbencher, and was not politically well known.

== Home Secretary: 1830–1834 ==
Following the 1830 general election in November the Whigs came to power under Lord Grey. Melbourne was Home Secretary. During the disturbances of 1830–32 he "acted both vigorously and sensitively, and it was for this function that his reforming brethren thanked him heartily". In the aftermath of the Swing Riots of 1830–31, he countered the Tory magistrates' alarmism by refusing to resort to military force; instead, he advocated magistrates' usual powers be fully enforced, along with special constables and financial rewards for the arrest of rioters and rabble-rousers. He appointed a special commission to try approximately 1,000 of those arrested, and ensured that justice was strictly adhered to: one-third were acquitted and most of the one-fifth sentenced to death were instead transported.

There remains controversy regarding the hanging of Dic Penderyn, a protester in the Merthyr Rising who was then, and is now, widely judged to have been innocent. He appears to have been executed solely on the word of Melbourne, who sought a victim in order to "set an example". The disturbances over reform in 1831–32 were countered with the enforcement of the usual laws; again, Melbourne refused to pass emergency legislation against sedition.

Melbourne supported the 1834 prosecution and transportation of the Tolpuddle Martyrs to Australia for their attempts to protest against the cutting of agricultural wages.

== Prime Minister: 1834–1841 ==
=== Government ===
After Lord Grey resigned as prime minister in July 1834, William IV was forced to appoint another Whig to replace him, as the Tories were not strong enough to support a government. Melbourne, who was the man most likely to be both acceptable to the King and to hold the Whig Party together, hesitated after receiving from Grey a letter from the King requesting Melbourne to visit him to discuss the formation of a government. Melbourne feared he would not enjoy the extra work that accompanied the office of Premier, but he did not want to let his friends and party down. According to Charles Greville, Melbourne said to his secretary, Tom Young: "I think it's a damned bore. I am in many minds as to what to do". Young replied: "Why, damn it all, such a position was never held by any Greek or Roman: and if it only lasts three months, it will be worthwhile to have been Prime Minister of England." "By God, that's true", Melbourne said, "I'll go!"

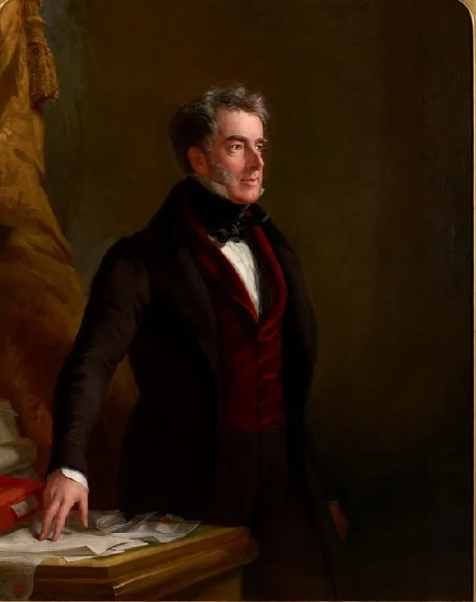
A portrait of Melbourne by George Hayter in. 1838

Compromise was the key to many of Melbourne's actions. He was personally opposed to the Reform Act 1832 proposed by the Whigs and later opposed the repeal of the Corn Laws, but he reluctantly agreed to both.

Melbourne was also a strong supporter of slavery. He called Britain's abolition of slavery in 1833 a "great folly" and said that if he had had his own way (as opposed to what many Whigs wanted), he would "have done nothing at all!" He had told his sister-in-law that "slavery was a matter of necessity", was hesitant to pressure foreign governments about slavery, and saw slavery as "no bar to the recognition of Texan independence."

He was in many similar ways uninterested in egalitarianism. Disgusted a British gentleman had been sent to prison for committing a crime, Melbourne wrote that "there ought to be a law for the rich and another for the poor" and concluded "equality is very bad."

William IV's opposition to the Whigs' reforming ways led him to dismiss Melbourne in November. He then gave the Tories under Sir Robert Peel an opportunity to form a government. Peel's failure to win a House of Commons majority in the resulting general election (January 1835) made it impossible for him to govern, and the Whigs returned to power under Melbourne that April. This was the last time a British monarch attempted to appoint a government to suit his own preferences.

=== Blackmail ===
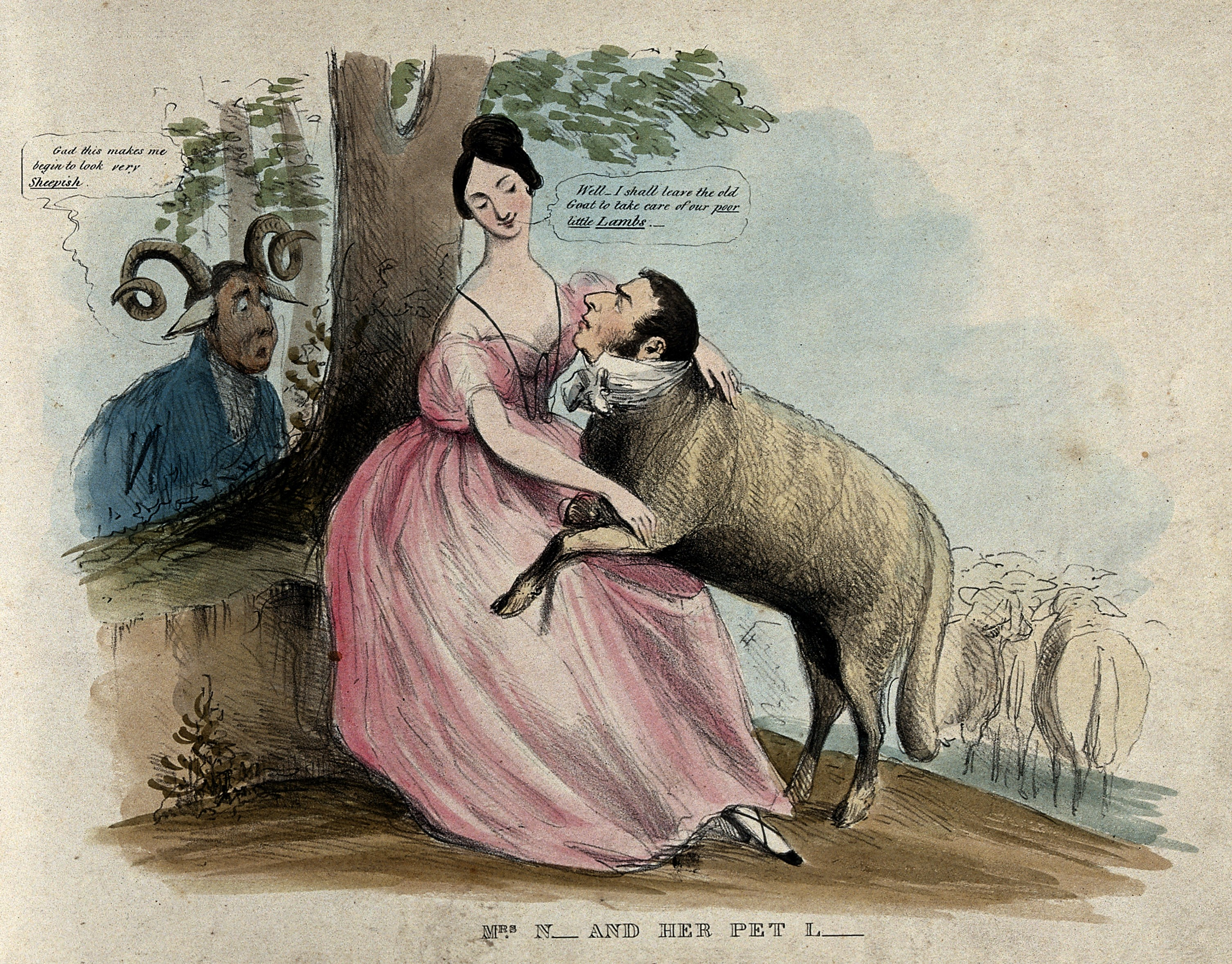
Cartoon about the affair

The next year, Melbourne was once again involved in a sex scandal. This time, he was the victim of attempted blackmail from George Chapple Norton, the husband of the society beauty and author Caroline Norton. George Norton demanded £1,400, and when he was turned down, he accused Melbourne of having an affair with his wife. At that time, such a scandal would have been enough to derail a major politician and so it is a measure of the respect that contemporaries had for his integrity that Melbourne's government did not fall. The King and the Duke of Wellington urged him to stay on as prime minister. After Norton failed in court, Melbourne was vindicated, but he stopped seeing Caroline Norton.

=== Further scandal ===
As the historian Boyd Hilton concludes, "it is irrefutable that Melbourne's personal life was problematic. Spanking sessions with aristocratic ladies were harmless, not so the whippings administered to orphan girls taken into his household as objects of charity".

=== Queen Victoria ===
Melbourne was prime minister when Queen Victoria acceded to the throne on 20 June 1837. Barely eighteen, she was only just breaking free from the domineering influence of her mother, the Duchess of Kent, and her mother's adviser, Sir John Conroy. Over the next four years, Melbourne trained her in the art of politics, and the two became friends: Victoria was quoted describing him as a father figure (her own had died when she was eight months old), and Melbourne's son had died at a young age. Melbourne was given a private apartment at Windsor Castle, and unfounded rumours circulated for a time that Victoria would marry Melbourne, 40 years her senior. Tutoring Victoria was the climax of Melbourne's career: the prime minister spent four to five hours a day visiting and writing to her, and she responded with enthusiasm.

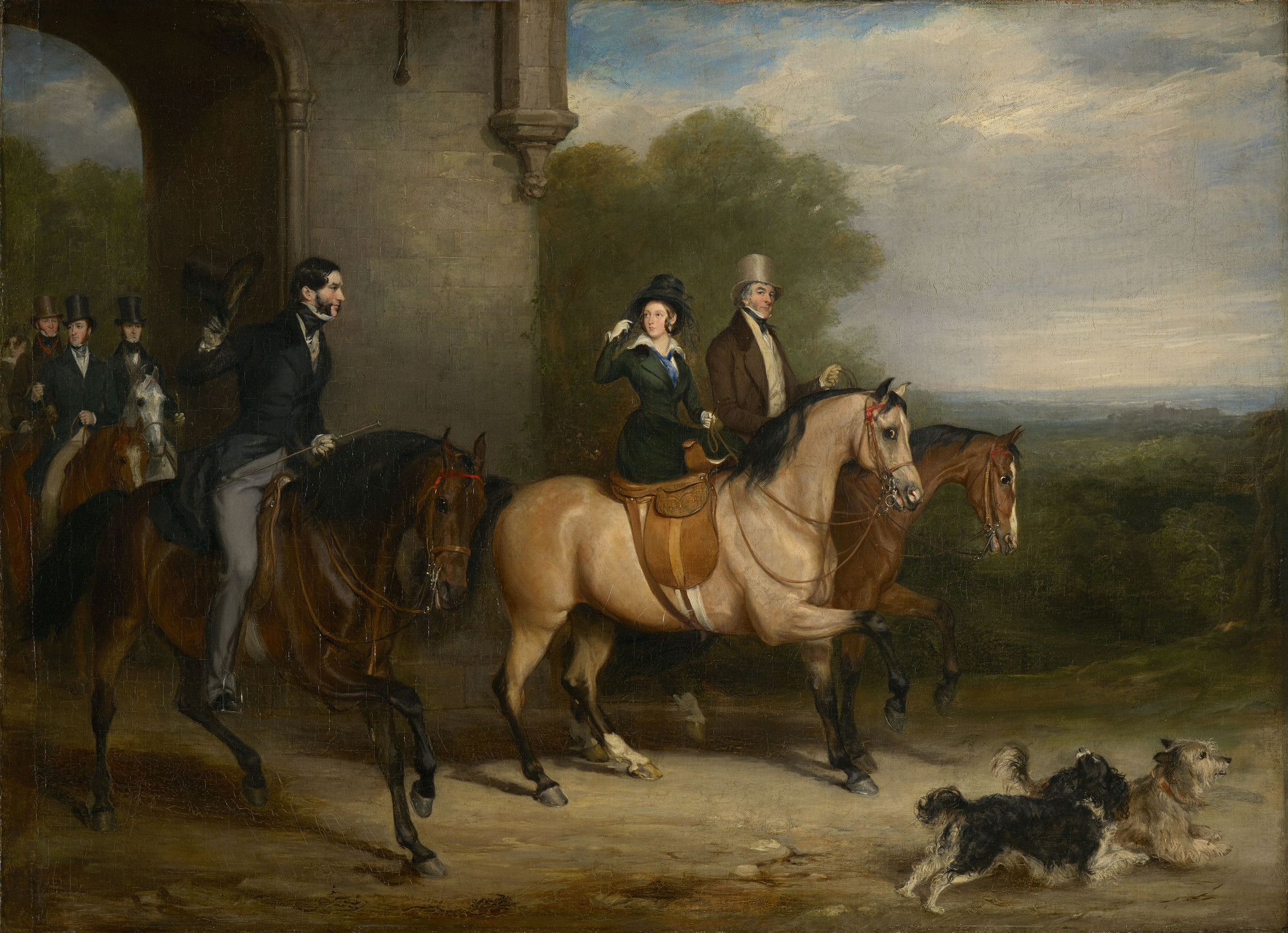
Queen Victoria Riding Out by Francis Grant, 1840

Lord Melbourne's tutoring of Victoria took place against a background of two damaging political events: first, the Lady Flora Hastings affair, followed not long after by the Bedchamber Crisis. Victoria's reputation suffered in an 1839 court intrigue when Hastings, one of her mother's ladies-in-waiting, developed an abdominal growth that was widely rumoured to be an out-of-wedlock pregnancy by Sir John Conroy. Victoria believed the rumours, as did Lord Melbourne. When Victoria told Melbourne of her suspicions, he planted the idea in her head that her mother, the Duchess of Kent, was jealous of Hastings's closeness to Conroy, which made Victoria excited and more resolute on the matter. Initially, Melbourne "suggested quiet watchfulness" over Hastings's body changes. But after the court physician, Sir James Clarke, had examined Hastings and generally concluded she wasn't pregnant, Melbourne was wholly persuaded Hastings must be pregnant from a throwaway comment that Clarke made about the appearance of virginity in spite of pregnancy. Melbourne immediately informed the queen. When Victoria observed to him that Hastings had not been seen in public for a while because "she was so sick," Melbourne "repeated, 'Sick?' with what the queen described as 'a significant laugh.'"

Although Victoria took to Lord Melbourne's advice, she occasionally found herself in opposition to his politics. When Melbourne failed to stay to vote for the Custody of Infants Act 1839, which granted women more rights of access to their own children, Victoria rebuked him. The Queen wrote that he defended his actions, stating: "I don't think you should give a woman too much right... there should not be two conflicting powers... a man ought to have the right in a family."

=== Foreign affairs ===
The Rebellions of 1837–1838 led directly to Lord Durham's Report on the Affairs of British North America and to The British North America Act, 1840 which established a new political entity, the Province of Canada.

The Whig cabinet under Melbourne decided on 1 October 1839 to send an expeditionary force to China to protect British interests in the trafficking of opium into China, against the wishes of the Chinese Daoguang Emperor. The First Opium War was fought between China and the United Kingdom from 1839 to 1842; one of the outcomes of the war was that Hong Kong would be ceded to the UK and become a British crown colony.

The First Anglo-Afghan War occurred between 1839 and 1842. At the beginning of the conflict, the East India Company troops had defeated the forces of Afghan Emir and in 1839 occupied Kabul.

The Treaty of Waitangi was signed on 6 February 1840 by representatives of the British Crown and Māori chiefs. In November 1840 a royal charter was signed by Queen Victoria, establishing New Zealand as a Crown colony.

=== Rule and resignation ===
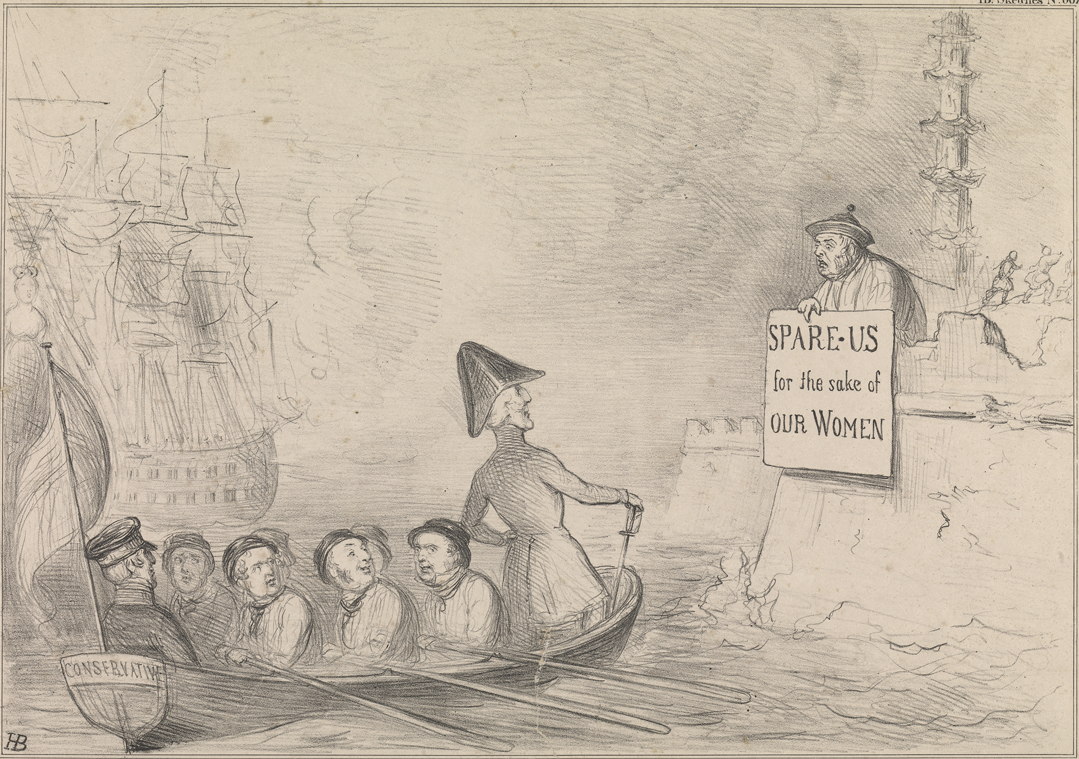
Satire of the Bedchamber crisis by John Doyle, 31 December 1840

On 7 May 1839 Melbourne intended to resign, which began a series of events that led to the Bedchamber Crisis. A prospective prime minister, Peel, requested that Victoria dismiss some of the wives and daughters of Whig MPs who made up her personal entourage, arguing that the monarch should avoid any hint of favouritism to a party out of power. The Queen refused to comply and was supported by Melbourne, although Melbourne was unaware that Peel had not requested the resignation of all of the Queen's ladies, as she had led him to believe – and hence, Peel refused to form a new government, and Melbourne was persuaded to stay on as prime minister.

Among his government's Acts were a reduction in the number of capital offences, reforms of local government, and the reform of the Poor laws. This restricted the terms on which the poor were allowed relief and established compulsory admission to workhouses for the impoverished.

After Victoria fell in love with and became engaged to Prince Albert of Saxe-Coburg and Gotha on 15 October 1839, Melbourne helped to push through approval for the marriage in Parliament, although with some stumbling blocks, including Victoria's insistence that Albert should be made king consort, to which Melbourne asked Victoria "to hear no more of it." On the eve of Victoria's wedding on 10 February 1840, Melbourne reported Victoria being "very angry" with him after she had remarked it pleased her Albert did not look at other women, only for Melbourne to respond "no, that sort of thing is apt to come later." Melbourne reported Victoria responded "I shan't soon forgive you for that", rubbing his hands and chuckling over it while telling the story to Lord Clarendon. The morning after her wedding, Victoria wrote to Melbourne of her "most gratifying and bewildering night" with Albert, and how she never thought she "could be so loved."

Melbourne, perhaps to allay any possible influence that the next (almost certainly) Tory prime minister may have on the Queen, encouraged Victoria to show her husband all of the state papers he wished to see, as Melbourne knew Albert was above party politics. Melbourne also advised Albert on the Prince's issues with Baroness Louise Lehzen, Victoria's former governess who ran the Queen's household. Suspecting Lehzen was partly to blame for Victoria withholding royal business from Albert, Melbourne spoke (so he told Victoria) "most seriously" to Lehzen, to warn the Baroness that her attempts to retain her fading influence by creating dissention between Victoria and Albert would "draw ruin upon herself." Lehzen was dismissed in 1842.

On 25 February 1841 Melbourne was admitted as a Fellow of the Royal Society.

Following a vote of no confidence, initiated by the Conservative MP John Stuart-Wortley, Melbourne's government fell, and he resigned as prime minister on 30 August 1841.

== Later life: 1841–1848 ==
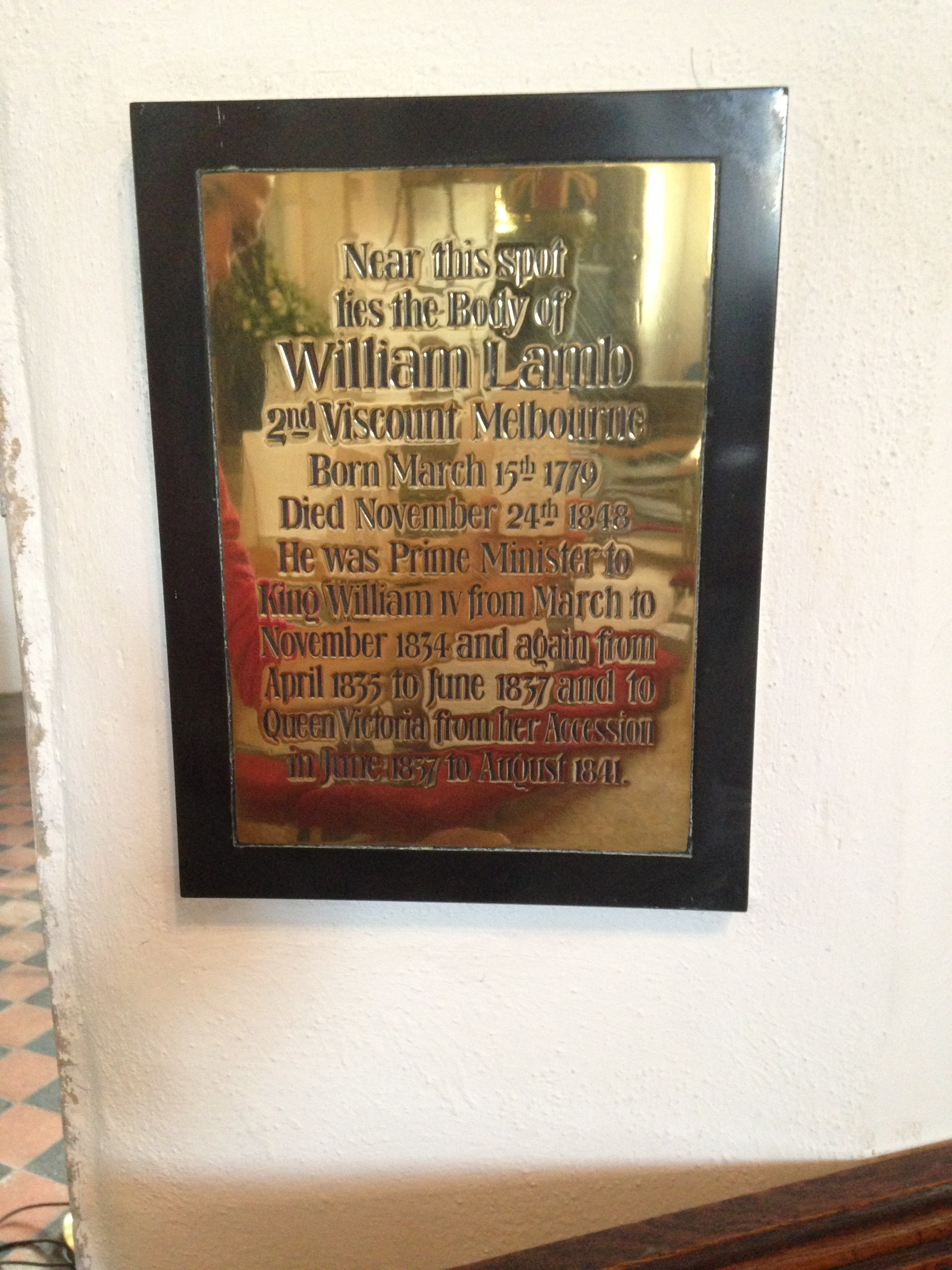
A plaque marking the burial of Melbourne at St Etheldreda's Church, Hatfield, in Hertfordshire, England

After Melbourne resigned permanently in August 1841, Victoria continued to write to him about political matters, but as it was deemed inappropriate after a time, their letters became cordial and non-political without issue. On 1 October 1842, in reflecting on a prior journal entry from 1839 in which she had described her "happiness" with Melbourne, Victoria wrote that she "looked over and corrected one of my old journals, which do not now awake very pleasant feelings. The life I led then was so artificial and superficial, and yet I thought I was happy. Thank God! I now know what real happiness means."

Victoria, having begun to venerate Melbourne's successor Sir Robert Peel, declared that the fall of Melbourne's government in 1841 "was an advantage to the country." Years later, Victoria—having since firmly embraced a constitutional monarchy above party politics—recalled the qualities she found excellent in Melbourne, but would condemn him as being "too much of a party man [who] made me a Party Queen."

=== Death ===
Though weakened, Melbourne survived a stroke on 23 October 1842, 14 months after his departure from politics. In retirement he lived at Brocket Hall, Hertfordshire. He died at home on 24 November 1848. There is a memorial to him in St Paul's Cathedral.

Upon his death his titles passed to his brother, Frederick, as his son, George Augustus Frederick (1807–1836), had predeceased him.

== Legacy ==
- Melbourne, the capital city of Victoria, Australia, was named in his honour in March 1837; he was prime minister at the time. Melbourne, Florida was named after this city.
- Mount Melbourne, a stratovolcano in Antarctica, was also named in his honour by the Royal Navy officer and explorer James Clark Ross in 1841.

== In literature ==
The British poet Letitia Elizabeth Landon's poetical illustration Lord Melbourne, to a portrait by Thomas Lawrence, was published in Fisher's Drawing Room Scrap Book in 1837. It is one of the few instances in which she allowed herself a political comment.

In the American novelist Harper Lee's 1960 novel To Kill a Mockingbird, the character Jack Finch tells a story about Lord Melbourne to the protagonist, Scout Finch.

== In popular culture ==
Melbourne has been portrayed by several actors:

- H. B. Warner in the film Victoria the Great (1937)
- Frederick Leister in the film The Prime Minister (1941)
- Karl Ludwig Diehl in the Austrian film Victoria in Dover (1954)
- Felix Aylmer in the American series Victoria Regina (1961)
- Jon Finch in the film Lady Caroline Lamb (1972)
- Joseph O'Conor in the series Edward the Seventh (1975)
- Nigel Hawthorne in the series Victoria & Albert (2001)
- Paul Bettany in the film The Young Victoria (2009)
- Rufus Sewell in the series Victoria (2016–2019)

== Arms ==
Coat of arms of William Lamb, 2nd Viscount Melbourne
Crest A demi-lion rampant gules holding between the paws a mullet sable. Escutcheon Sable, on a fess erminois between three cinquefoils argent, two mullets of the field. Supporters Two lions gules collared and chained or, on each collar two mullets sable. Motto Virtute et fide (By bravery and faith).

== Bibliography ==
- Cecil, David (1954). Melbourne. London: Constable. 1954. major biography focused on his psychology
- Cecil, David (1939). The Young Melbourne: And the Story of His Marriage with Caroline Lamb. Archived from the original on 23 October 2012 – via Questia.
- Dunkley, Henry ("VERAX") (1890). Lord Melbourne.
- Hibbert, Christopher (2000) Queen Victoria: A Personal History, London: HarperCollins, ISBN 0-00-638843-4
- Mandler, Peter (1 January 2008) [1 September 2004]. "Lamb, William, second Viscount Melbourne (1779–1848)". Oxford Dictionary of National Biography (online ed.). Oxford University Press. doi:10.1093/ref:odnb/15920. (Subscription, Wikipedia Library access or UK public library membership required.)
- Marshall, Dorothy (1975). Lord Melbourne. Weidenfeld & Nicolson. ISBN 978-0297767732.
- Mitchell, L. G. (1997). Lord Melbourne, 1779–1848. Oxford: Oxford University Press. ISBN 978-0198205920. Archived from the original on 12 June 2008 – via Questia.
- Newbould, I. D. C. (December 1976). "William IV and the Dismissal of the Whigs, 1834". Canadian Journal of History. 11 (3): 311–330. doi:10.3138/cjh.11.3.311.
- Newbould, Ian D. C. (1980). "Whiggery and the Dilemma of Reform: Liberals, Radicals, and the Melbourne Administration, 1835-9". Bulletin of the Institute of Historical Research. 53 (128): 229–241. doi:10.1111/j.1468-2281.1980.tb01745.x.
- Somerset, Anne (2024). Queen Victoria and Her Prime Ministers: Her Life, the Imperial Ideal, and the Politics and Turmoil That Shaped Her Extraordinary Reign. New York: Knopf. ISBN 978-1101875575. OCLC 1427662307.
- Weintraub, Stanley (1997). Albert : uncrowned king. London: John Murray. ISBN 0-7195-5756-9. OCLC 36727394.
- Weintraub, Stanley (1987). Victoria : biography of a queen. London: Allen & Unwin. ISBN 978-0-04-923084-2. OCLC 15016119.
- Ziegler, Philip (1987). Melbourne: A Life of William Lamb, 2nd Viscount Melbourne. London: HarperCollins. ISBN 978-0-00-217957-7.

Political offices
Preceded by Henry Goulburn	Chief Secretary for Ireland; 1827–1828	Succeeded by The Lord Francis Leveson-Gower
Preceded by Sir Robert Peel, Bt	Home Secretary; 1830–1834	Succeeded by Viscount Duncannon
Preceded by The Earl Grey	Prime Minister of the United Kingdom; 16 July 1834 – 14 November 1834	Succeeded by The Duke of Wellington (caretaker, followed by); Sir Robert Peel, Bt
Preceded by The Earl Grey	Leader of the House of Lords; 1834	Succeeded by The Duke of Wellington
Preceded by Sir Robert Peel, Bt	Prime Minister of the United Kingdom; 18 April 1835 – 30 August 1841	Succeeded by Sir Robert Peel, Bt
Preceded by The Duke of Wellington	Leader of the House of Lords; 1835–1841	Succeeded by The Duke of Wellington
Parliament of the United Kingdom
Preceded by John Lubbock; Charles Kinnaird	Member of Parliament for Leominster; 1806; With: John Lubbock	Succeeded by John Lubbock; Henry Bonham
Preceded by Henry Erskine	Member of Parliament for Haddington Burghs; 1806-1807	Succeeded by Sir George Warrender, 4th Baronet
Preceded by Sir Oswald Mosley	Member of Parliament for Portarlington; 1807–1812	Succeeded by Arthur Shakespeare
Preceded by William Elliot; George Ponsonby	Member of Parliament for Peterborough; 1816–1819; With: William Elliot 1816–1819; Sir James Scarlett 1819	Succeeded by Sir James Scarlett; Sir Robert Heron, Bt
Preceded by Thomas Brand; Sir John Saunders Sebright	Member of Parliament for Hertfordshire; 1819–1826; With: Sir John Saunders Sebright	Succeeded by Sir John Saunders Sebright; Nicolson Calvert
Preceded by George Canning; William Henry John Scott	Member of Parliament for Newport (Isle of Wight); 1827; With: William Henry John Scott	Succeeded by William Henry John Scott; Spencer Perceval
Preceded by William Russell; Charles Tennyson	Member of Parliament for Bletchingley; 1827–1828; With: Charles Tennyson	Succeeded by Charles Tennyson; William Ewart
Party political offices
Preceded by The Earl Grey	Leader of the British Whig Party; 1834–1842	Succeeded by The Marquess of Lansdowne; Lord John Russell
Preceded by The Earl Grey	Whig Leader in the House of Lords; 1834–1842	Succeeded by The Marquess of Lansdowne
Peerage of Ireland
Preceded by Peniston Lamb	Viscount Melbourne; 1828–1848	Succeeded by Frederick Lamb
Peerage of the United Kingdom
Preceded by Peniston Lamb	Baron Melbourne; 1828–1848; Member of the House of Lords (1828–1848)	Succeeded by Frederick Lamb
