= Frederick Lamb, 3rd Viscount Melbourne =

British diplomat

The Right Honourable The Viscount Melbourne GCB PC
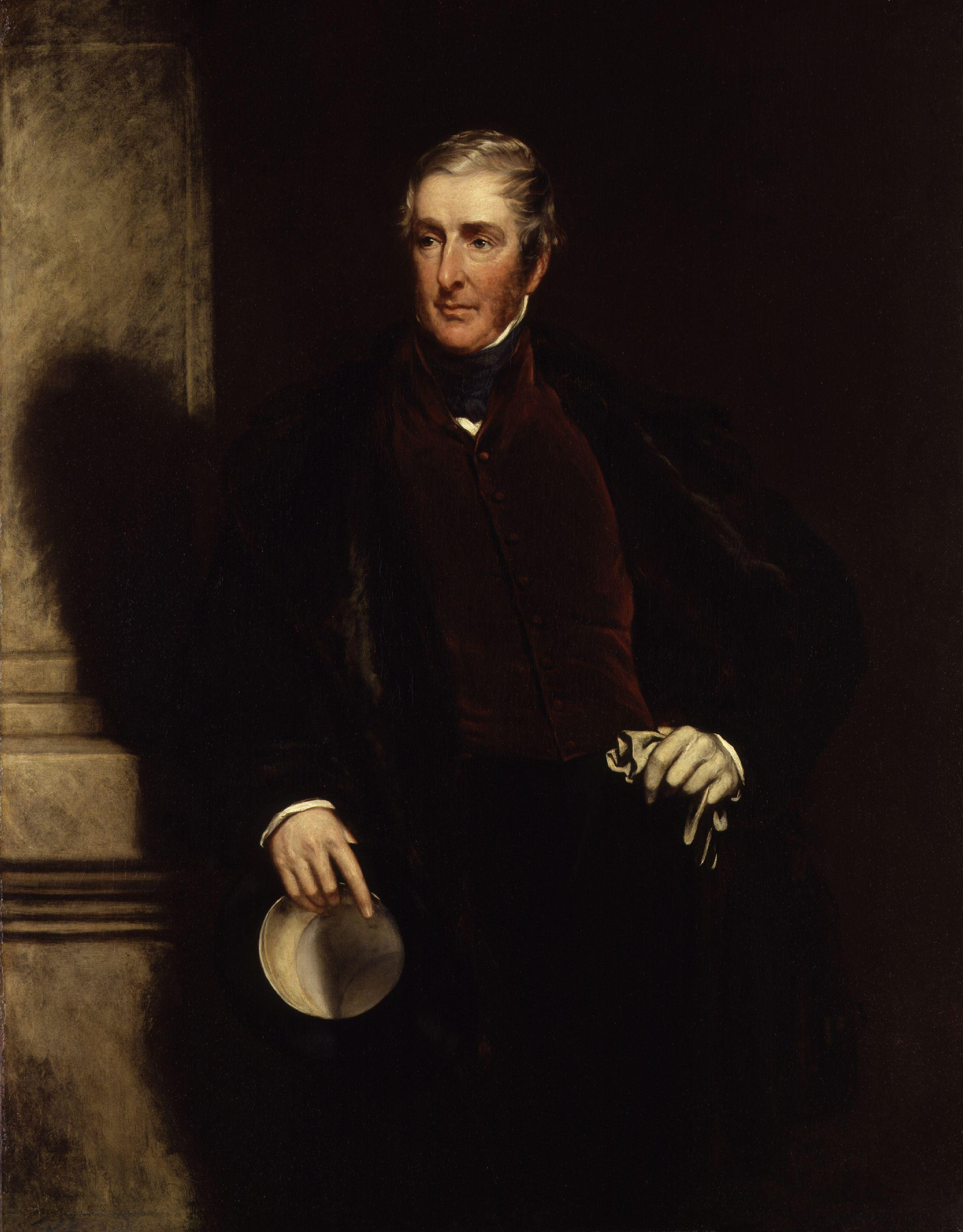
- 1846 portrait by John Partridge

British Ambassador to Austria
- In office 1831–1841
- Preceded by: Sir Henry Wellesley
- Succeeded by: Sir Robert Gordon

British Ambassador to Portugal
- In office 1827–1831
- Preceded by: Sir William à Court
- Succeeded by: Baron Howard de Walden

British Minister to Bavaria
- In office 1815–1820
- Preceded by: George Rose
- Succeeded by: Brook Taylor

Personal details
- Born: Frederick James Lamb; 17 April 1782
- Died: 29 January 1853 (aged 70)
- Spouse: Countess Alexandrina von Maltzan
- Relations: William Lamb, 2nd Viscount Melbourne (brother); Emily Lamb, Countess Cowper (sister)
- Parent(s): Peniston Lamb, 1st Viscount Melbourne; Elizabeth Milbanke
- Education: Eton College
- Alma mater: University of Glasgow; Trinity College, Cambridge

Frederick James Lamb, 3rd Viscount Melbourne, GCB, PC (17 April 1782 – 29 January 1853), known as The Lord Beauvale from 1839 to 1848, was a British diplomat.

== Early life ==
Lamb was a younger son of Peniston Lamb, 1st Viscount Melbourne, and his wife Elizabeth Milbanke, and the younger brother of Prime Minister William Lamb, 2nd Viscount Melbourne. Since his mother had numerous lovers, his real paternity is a matter of conjecture.

Lamb was educated at Eton College; the University of Glasgow (1799–1801, studying with Professor John Millar alongside his older brother William); and Trinity College, Cambridge (admitted 1801, graduated M.A. 1803).

William, Frederick and their sister Emily Lamb, Countess Cowper remained close all their lives, although Frederick and Emily disliked William's wife Lady Caroline Lamb, whom they called "the little beast".

== Career ==
He served as British Ambassador to Vienna ending in 1841. He was invested as a Knight Grand Cross of the Order of the Bath and admitted to the Privy Council in 1822. In 1839 he was raised to the peerage as Baron Beauvale, of Beauvale in the County of Nottingham. In 1848 he succeeded his elder brother as third Viscount Melbourne.

Despite a certain personal distance between them, Lord Palmerston, as Foreign Secretary placed great confidence in Lamb, wrote to him in a courteous style very different from his usual brusque manner, and left the running of the Vienna Embassy almost entirely in his hands. The coolness was due to Palmerston's decades-long affair with Lamb's sister Emily, Lady Cowper; Lamb disapproved of the affair and disapproved equally of their eventual marriage, although this proved to be very happy. Palmerston's biographer notes that the marriage coincided with the early stages of the Oriental Crisis of 1840, and that the two men, although they were then personally barely on speaking terms, co-operated in an entirely professional way to resolve it. Palmerston, in addition to his real respect for Lamb, was anxious not to quarrel with him for Emily's sake: as Charles Greville remarked: "the Chief (Palmerston) is devoted to the sister and the sister to the brother". Relations between the two men became friendlier in later years, partly because both Palmerston and Emily were fond of Frederick's wife Alexandrina.

== Personal life ==
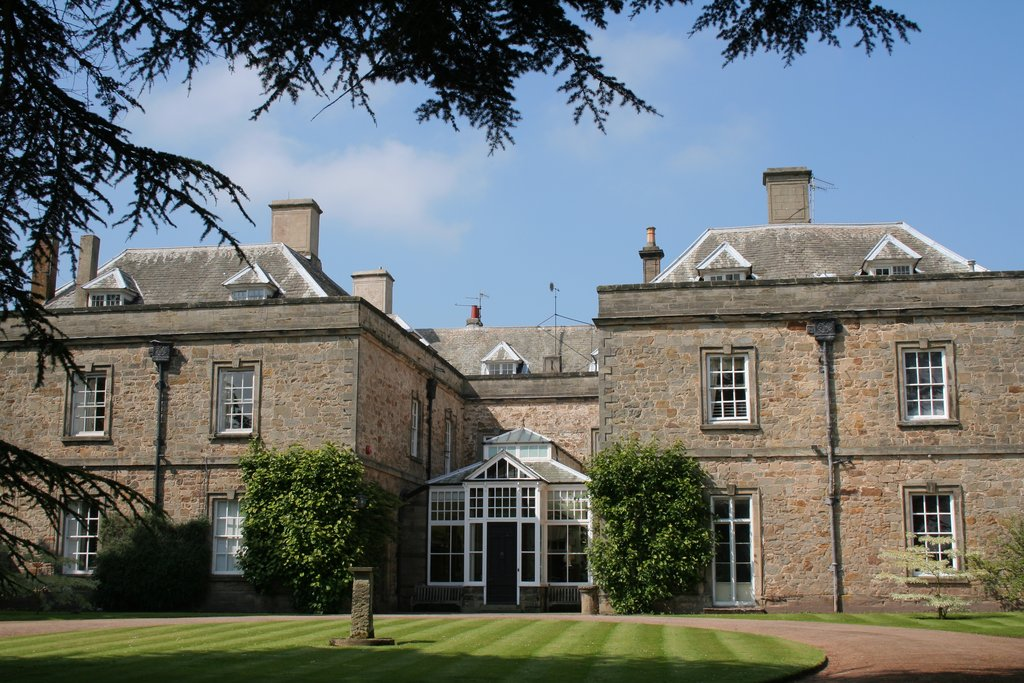
Melbourne Hall, Derbyshire

In 1841, Lord Beauvale married Alexandrina Julia Theresa Wilhelmina Sophia Gräfin von Maltzan (1818–1894), daughter of Joachim Charles Leslie Mortimer, Graf von Maltzan. It was generally considered to be a love marriage: even though Alexandrina was more than thirty years her husband's junior, he was described as being "as handsome and debonair at sixty as he had been at twenty-five."

Lord Melbourne died childless in January 1853, aged 70, and all his titles became extinct. The family seat of Melbourne Hall passed to his sister Emily. There is a memorial to him in St Paul's Cathedral.

His widow remarried in 1856 to John Weld-Forester, 2nd Baron Forester, was widowed again in 1873, and died in 1894.

== Arms ==
Coat of arms of Frederick Lamb, 3rd Viscount Melbourne
| Crest A demi-lion rampant gules holding between the paws a mullet sable. Escutcheon Sable, on a fess erminois between three cinquefoils argent, two mullets of the field. Supporters Two lions gules collared and chained or, on each collar two mullets sable. Motto Virtute et fide (By bravery and faith). Orders The Most Honourable Order of the Bath (GCB). |

Diplomatic posts
| Preceded by George Rose | British Minister to Bavaria; 1815–1820 | Succeeded by Brook Taylor |
| Preceded by Sir William à Court | British Ambassador to Portugal; 1827–1831 | Succeeded by Baron Howard de Walden |
| Preceded by Sir Henry Wellesley | British Ambassador to Austria; 1831–1841 | Succeeded by Sir Robert Gordon |
Peerage of Ireland
| Preceded by William Lamb | Viscount Melbourne; 1848–1853 | Extinct |
Peerage of the United Kingdom
| New creation | Baron Beauvale; 1839–1853 | Extinct |
| Preceded by William Lamb | Baron Melbourne; 1848–1853 | Extinct |
