= Portrait of Lord Melbourne (Lawrence) =

1805 painting by Thomas Lawrence

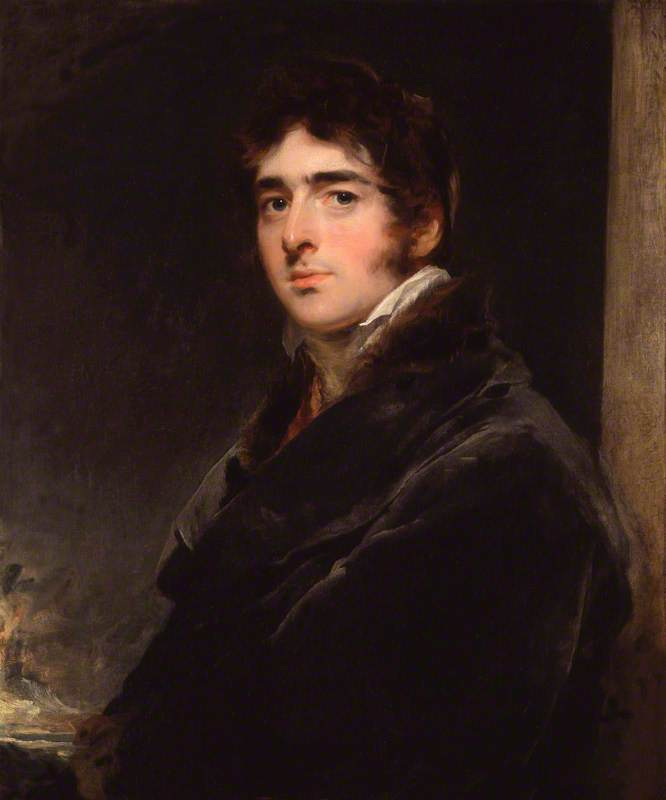
- Artist: Thomas Lawrence
- Year: 1805
- Type: Oil on canvas, portrait
- Dimensions: 75.9 cm × 63.2 cm (29.9 in × 24.9 in)
- Location: National Portrait Gallery, London

Portrait of Lord Melbourne is a portrait painting by the English artist Thomas Lawrence portraying the British Whig politician and future Prime Minister Lord Melbourne. It is also known as the Portrait of William Lamb as he had not yet inherited the title from his father when it was painted. It is today in the National Portrait Gallery in London.

A fashionable portraitist and President of the Royal Academy, Lawrence depicted a number of British Prime Ministers during his career as well as numerous foreign dignitaries. After spending much of his early life in opposition, Melbourne served twice as Prime Minister during the 1830s.

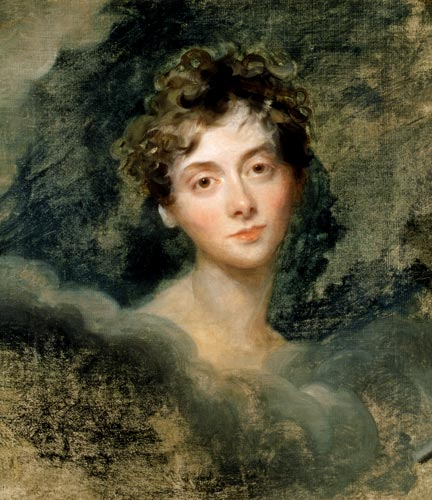
Lady Caroline Lamb, painted by Lawrence around the same time as her husband. Melbourne had a troubled relationship with his wife.

It was painted around the time of his marriage to Lady Caroline Lamb, who Lawrence also depicted. Lawrence captures an image of Melbourne as a rising young, politician in fashionable Regency style. A later portrait by John Partridge shows Melbourne as a statesman during the early years of Queen Victoria's reign.

== See also ==
- Portrait of William Lamb, a 1796 painting by John Hoppner
- Portrait of Lord Melbourne, an 1844 work by John Partridge

== Bibliography ==
- Fraser, Antonia. Lady Caroline Lamb: A Free Spirit. Simon and Schuster, 2023.
- Levey, Michael. Sir Thomas Lawrence. Yale University Press, 2005.
- Mitchell, Leslie George, Lord Melbourne, 1779-1848. Oxford University Press, 1997.
- Seldon, Anthony. The Impossible Office?: The History of the British Prime Minister. Cambridge University Press, 2024.
