= Henry John Temple, 3rd Viscount Palmerston =

Prime Minister of the United Kingdom (1855–1858, 1859–1865)

The Right Honourable The Viscount Palmerston KG GCB PC FRS
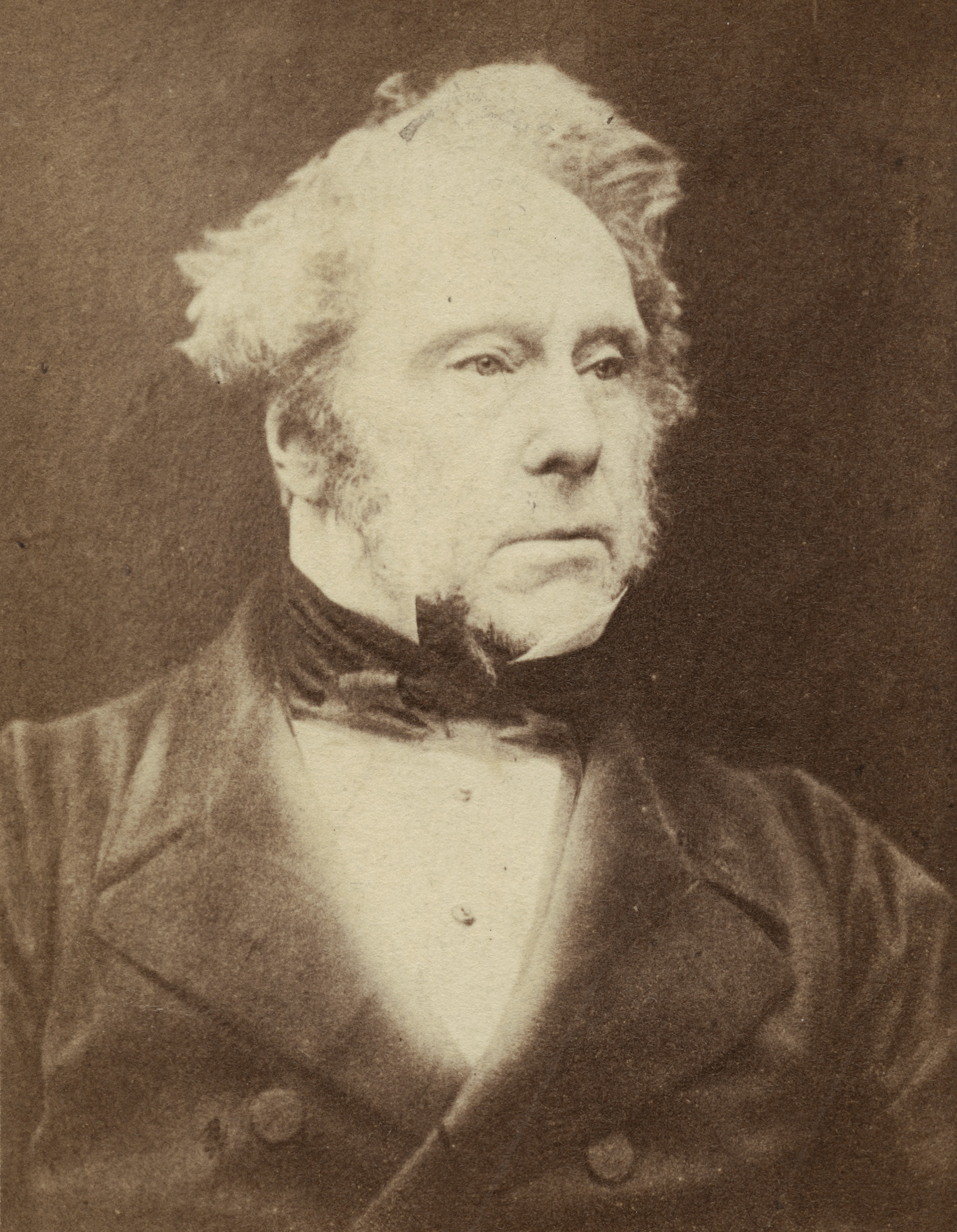
- Palmerston in 1857

Prime Minister of the United Kingdom
- In office 12 June 1859 – 18 October 1865
- Monarch: Victoria
- Preceded by: The Earl of Derby
- Succeeded by: The Earl Russell
- In office 6 February 1855 – 19 February 1858
- Monarch: Victoria
- Preceded by: The Earl of Aberdeen
- Succeeded by: The Earl of Derby
Ministerial positions
Home Secretary
In office 28 December 1852 – 6 February 1855
Prime Minister	The Earl of Aberdeen
Preceded by	Spencer Horatio Walpole
Succeeded by	Sir George Grey
Foreign Secretary
In office 6 July 1846 – 26 December 1851
Prime Minister	Lord John Russell
Preceded by	The Earl of Aberdeen
Succeeded by	The 2nd Earl Granville
In office 18 April 1835 – 2 September 1841
Prime Minister	The Viscount Melbourne
Preceded by	The Duke of Wellington
Succeeded by	The Earl of Aberdeen
In office 22 November 1830 – 15 November 1834
Prime Minister	The Earl Grey; The Viscount Melbourne
Preceded by	The Earl of Aberdeen
Succeeded by	The Duke of Wellington
Secretary at War
In office November 1809 – May 1828
Prime Minister	Spencer Perceval; The Earl of Liverpool; George Canning; The Viscount Goderich
Preceded by	The 1st Earl Granville
Succeeded by	Sir Henry Hardinge

Personal details
- Born: Henry John Temple; 20 October 1784 Westminster, Middlesex, England
- Died: 18 October 1865 (aged 80) Brocket Hall, Hertfordshire, England
- Resting place: Westminster Abbey
- Party: Tory (1806–1830); Whig (1830–1859); Liberal (1859–1865)
- Spouse: Emily Lamb (m. 1839)
- Parents: Henry Temple (father); Mary Mee (mother)
- Education: University of Edinburgh; St John's College, Cambridge
- Nickname: Pam

Military service
- Allegiance: Great Britain
- Branch/service: British Militia
- Years of service: 1803–1816
- Rank: Colonel
- Unit: South-West Hampshire Local Militia
- Battles/wars: War of the Third Coalition; Napoleonic Wars

Henry John Temple, 3rd Viscount Palmerston (20 October 1784 – 18 October 1865), known as Lord Palmerston, was an Anglo-Irish nobleman and statesman who was Prime Minister of the United Kingdom from 1855 to 1858 and from 1859 to his death in 1865. A member of the Tory, Whig and Liberal parties, Palmerston was also the first Liberal prime minister. An ideologue of free trade and a major sponsor of the Opium Wars against the Chinese Empire and the war against Egypt, he dominated British foreign policy from 1830 to 1865 when Britain stood at the height of its imperial power.

In 1802, Temple succeeded to his father's Irish peerage as the 3rd Viscount Palmerston. This Irish peerage did not entitle him to a seat in the House of Lords and Temple became a Tory MP in the House of Commons in 1807. From 1809 to 1828, he was Secretary at War, organising the finances of the army. He was Foreign Secretary in Whig cabinets from 1830–1834, 1835–1841 and 1846–1851, responding to a series of conflicts in Europe.

In 1852, Palmerston became Home Secretary in the government of the Earl of Aberdeen. As home secretary, Palmerston enacted various social reforms, although he opposed electoral reform. When Aberdeen's coalition fell in 1855 over its handling of the Crimean War, Palmerston was the only man able to sustain a majority in Parliament, and he became prime minister. He had two periods in office, 1855–1858 and 1859–1865, before his death in 1865 at the age of 80 years. Palmerston is considered to have been the "first truly popular" prime minister. He remains the most recent British prime minister to die in office.

Palmerston masterfully controlled public opinion by stimulating British nationalism. He was distrusted by Queen Victoria and most of the political leadership, but he received and sustained the favour of the press and the populace. Historians rank Palmerston as one of the greatest foreign secretaries, due to his handling of great crises, and commitments to the balance of power and British interests. His policies in relation to India, China, Italy, Belgium and Spain had extensive long-lasting beneficial consequences for Britain. However, Palmerston's leadership during the Opium Wars was questioned and denounced by other prominent statesmen. The consequences of the conquest of India have also been reconsidered with time.

== Early life: 1784–1806 ==
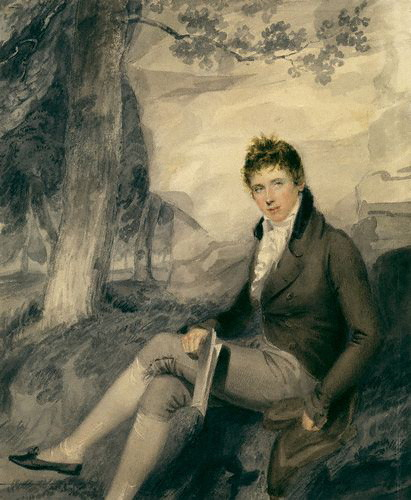
Temple (age 18) in 1802, by Thomas Heaphy

Henry John Temple was born in his family's Westminster house to the Irish branch of the Temple family on 20 October 1784. His family derived their title from the Peerage of Ireland, although he rarely visited Ireland. His father was Henry Temple, 2nd Viscount Palmerston (1739–1802), an Anglo-Irish peer, and his mother was Mary (1752–1805), a daughter of Benjamin Mee, a London merchant. From 1792 to 1794, he accompanied his family on a long Continental tour. While in Italy, Palmerston acquired an Italian tutor, who taught him to speak and write fluent Italian. The family owned a huge country estate in the north of County Sligo in the northwest of Ireland.

He was educated at Harrow School (1795–1800). Admiral Sir Augustus Clifford, 1st Bt., was a fag to Palmerston, Viscount Althorp and Viscount Duncannon and later remembered Palmerston as by far the most merciful of the three. Temple was often engaged in school fights and fellow Old Harrovians remembered Temple as someone who stood up to bullies twice his size. Henry Temple's father took him to the House of Commons in 1799, where the young Palmerston shook hands with the prime minister, William Pitt the Younger.

Temple was then at the University of Edinburgh (1800–1803), where he learnt political economy from Dugald Stewart, a friend of the Scottish philosophers Adam Ferguson and Adam Smith. Temple later described his time at Edinburgh as producing "whatever useful knowledge and habits of mind I possess". Lord Minto wrote to the young Palmerston's parents that Henry Temple was well-mannered and charming. Stewart wrote to a friend, saying of Temple: "In point of temper and conduct he is everything his friends could wish. Indeed, I cannot say that I have ever seen a more faultless character at this time of life, or one possessed of more amiable dispositions."

Henry Temple succeeded his father to the title of Viscount Palmerston on 17 April 1802, before he had turned 18. He also inherited a vast country estate in the north of County Sligo in the west of Ireland. He later built Classiebawn Castle on this estate. Palmerston went to St John's College, Cambridge (1803–1806). As a nobleman, he was entitled to take his MA without examinations, but Palmerston wished to obtain his degree through examinations. This was declined, although he was allowed to take the separate college examinations, where he obtained first-class honours.

After war was declared on France in 1803, Palmerston joined the Volunteers mustered to oppose a French invasion, being one of the three officers in the unit for St John's College. He was also appointed Lieutenant-Colonel Commandant of the Romsey Volunteers. When the Volunteers were subsumed into the Local Militia, he commanded the South-West Hampshire Local Militia from March 1809 to April 1816. Based at Romsey the regiment assembled for two weeks' training each year.

== Early political career: 1806–1809 ==
In February 1806, Palmerston was defeated in the election for the University of Cambridge constituency. In November he was elected for Horsham but was unseated in January 1807, when the Whig majority in the Commons voted for a petition to unseat him.

Due to the patronage of Lord Chichester and Lord Malmesbury, Palmerston was given the post of Junior Lord of the Admiralty in the ministry of the Duke of Portland. He stood again for the Cambridge seat in May, but lost by three votes after he advised his supporters to vote for the other Tory candidate in the two-member constituency so as to ensure a Tory was elected.

Palmerston entered Parliament as Tory MP for the pocket borough of Newport on the Isle of Wight in June 1807.

On 3 February 1808, he spoke in support of confidentiality in the working of diplomacy, and of the bombardment of Copenhagen and the capture and destruction of the Royal Danish Navy by the Royal Navy in the Battle of Copenhagen. Denmark was neutral but Napoleon had recently agreed with the Russians in the Treaty of Tilsit to build a naval alliance against Britain, including using the Danish navy for invading Britain. Pre-empting this, the British offered Denmark the choice of temporarily handing over its navy until the war's end or the destruction of their navy. The Danes refused to comply and so Copenhagen was bombarded. Palmerston justified the attack by peroration with reference to the ambitions of Napoleon to take control of the Danish fleet:

it is defensible on the ground that the enormous power of France enables her to coerce the weaker state to become an enemy of England... It is the law of self-preservation that England appeals for the justification of her proceedings. It is admitted by the honourable gentleman and his supporters, that if Denmark had evidenced any hostility towards this country, then we should have been justified in measures of retaliation... Denmark coerced into hostility stands in the same position as Denmark voluntarily hostile, when the law of self-preservation comes into play...Does anyone believe that Buonaparte will be restrained by any considerations of justice from acting towards Denmark as he has done towards other countries? ... England, according to that law of self-preservation which is a fundamental principle of the law of nations, is justified in securing, and therefore enforcing, from Denmark a neutrality which France would by compulsion have converted into an active hostility.

In a letter to a friend on 24 December 1807, he described the late Whig MP Edmund Burke as possessing "the palm of political prophecy". This would become a metaphor for his own career in divining the course of imperial foreign policy.

== Secretary at War: 1809–1828 ==
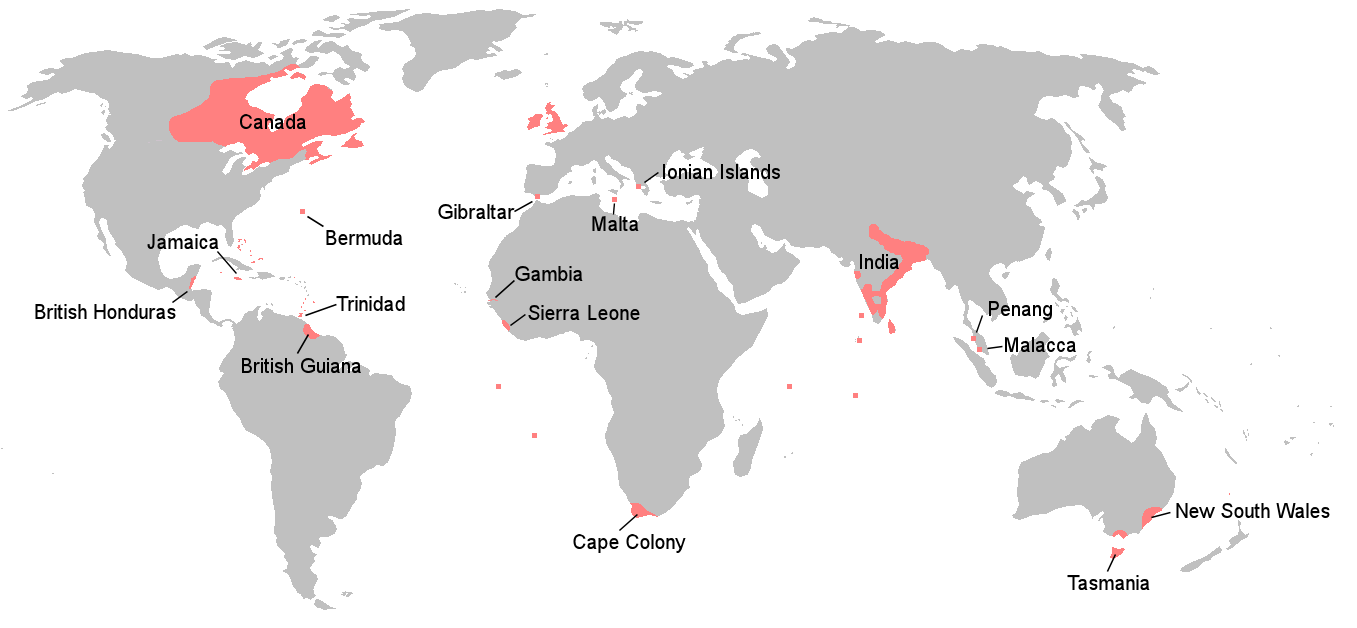
The British Empire at the end of the Napoleonic Wars in 1815

Palmerston's speech was so successful that Spencer Perceval, who formed his government in 1809, asked him to become Chancellor of the Exchequer, then a less important office than it was to become later. But Palmerston preferred the non-cabinet office of Secretary at War, charged exclusively with the financial business of the army. He served in that post for almost 20 years.

On 1 April 1818, a retired officer on half-pay, Lieutenant David Davies, who had a grievance about his application from the War Office for a pension and was also mentally ill, shot Palmerston as he walked up the stairs of the War Office. The bullet only grazed his back and the wound was slight. After learning of Davies' illness, Palmerston paid for his legal defence at the trial, and Davies was sent to Bethlem Royal Hospital.

After the suicide of Lord Castlereagh in 1822, Lord Liverpool, who was Prime Minister had to hold together the Tory Cabinet which began to split along political lines. The more liberal wing of the Tory government made some ground, with George Canning becoming Foreign Secretary and Leader of the House of Commons, William Huskisson advocating and applying the doctrines of free trade, and Catholic emancipation emerging as an open question. Although Palmerston was not in the Cabinet, he cordially supported the measures of Canning and his friends.

Upon the retirement of Lord Liverpool in April 1827, Canning was called to be prime minister. The more conservative Tories, including Sir Robert Peel, withdrew their support, and an alliance was formed between the liberal members of the late ministry and the Whigs. The post of Chancellor of the Exchequer was offered to Palmerston, who accepted it, but this appointment was frustrated by some intrigue between King George IV and John Charles Herries. Lord Palmerston remained Secretary at War, though he gained a seat in the cabinet for the first time. The Canning administration ended after only four months on the death of the Prime Minister, and was followed by the ministry of Lord Goderich, which barely survived the year.

The Canningites remained influential, and the Duke of Wellington hastened to include Palmerston, Huskisson, Charles Grant, William Lamb, and the Earl of Dudley in the government he subsequently formed. However, a dispute between Wellington and Huskisson over the issue of parliamentary representation for Manchester and Birmingham led to the resignation of Huskisson and his allies, including Palmerston. In the spring of 1828, after more than twenty years continuously in office, Palmerston found himself in opposition.

On 26 February 1828, Palmerston delivered a speech in favour of Catholic emancipation. He felt that it was unseemly to relieve the "imaginary grievances" of the Dissenters from the established church while at the same time "real afflictions pressed upon the Catholics" of Great Britain. Palmerston also supported parliamentary reform. One of his biographers has stated that: "Like many Pittites, now labelled tories, he was a good whig at heart." The Roman Catholic Relief Act 1829 finally passed Parliament in 1829 when Palmerston was in the opposition. The Great Reform Act passed Parliament in 1832.

== Opposition: 1828–1830 ==
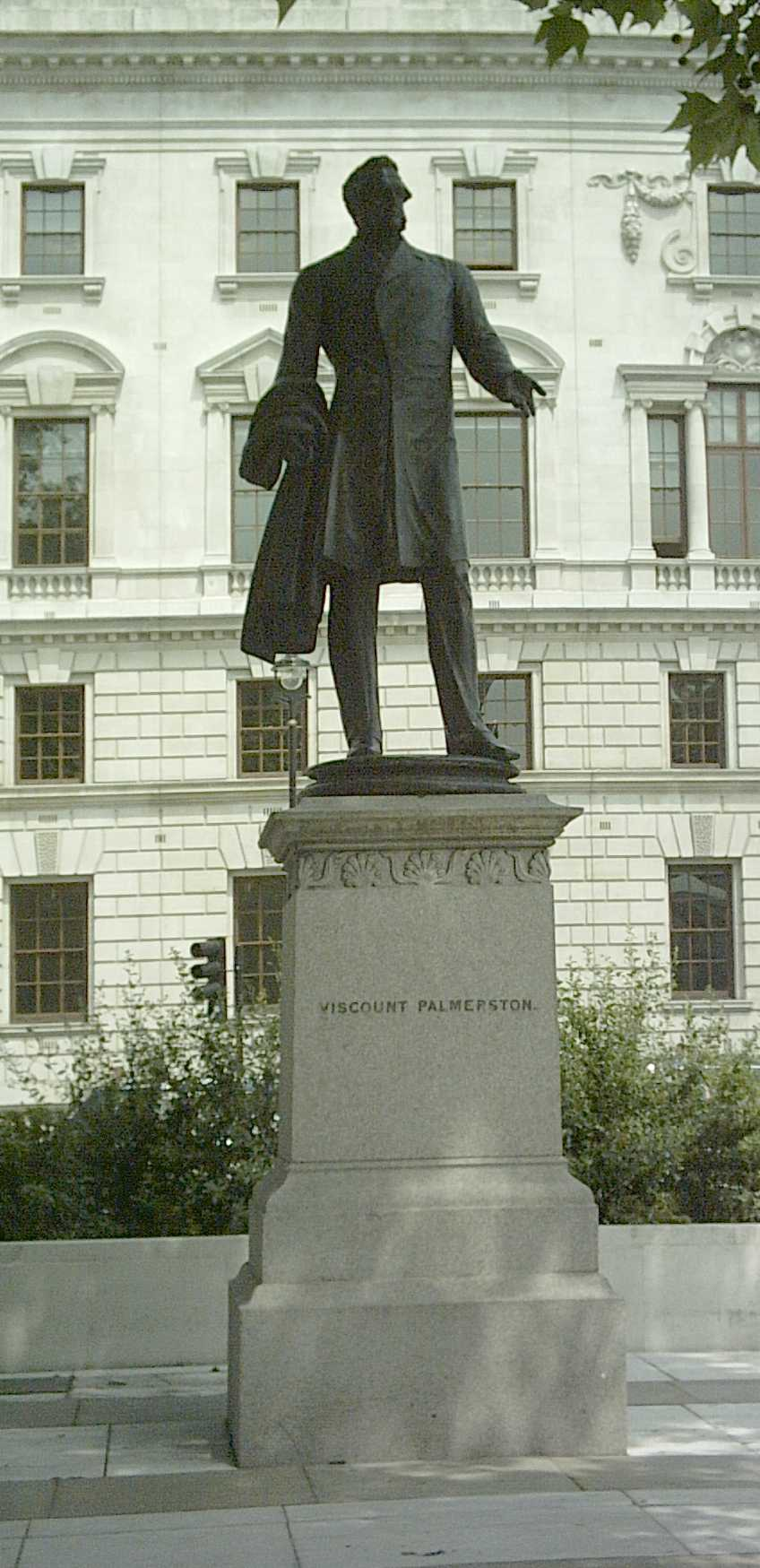
Statue of Lord Palmerston, Parliament Square, London, by Thomas Woolner

Following his move to opposition Palmerston appears to have focused closely on foreign policy. He had already urged Wellington into active interference in the Greek War of Independence, and he had made several visits to Paris, where he foresaw with great accuracy the impending overthrow of the Bourbons. On 1 June 1829 he made his first great speech on foreign affairs.

Lord Palmerston was no orator; his language was unstudied, and his delivery somewhat embarrassed; but generally he found the words to say the right thing at the right time, and to address the House of Commons in the language best adapted to the capacity and the temper of his audience.

— "Lord Palmerston", Encyclopaedia Britannica 13th Edition

in September 1830, Wellington tried to induce Palmerston to re-enter the cabinet, but he refused to do so without Lord Lansdowne and Lord Grey, two notable Whigs. This can be said to be the point in 1830, when his party allegiance changed. In November 1830 he accepted an offer from Lord Grey to join his new government as Foreign Secretary.

== Foreign Secretary: 1830–1841 ==
Palmerston entered the office of Foreign Secretary with great energy and continued to exert his influence there for twenty years; he held it from 1830 to 1834 (his apprentice years), 1835 to 1841, and 1846 to 1851. Basically, Palmerston was responsible for the whole of British foreign policy from the time of the French and Belgian Revolutions of 1830 until December 1851. His abrasive style would earn him the nickname "Lord Pumice Stone", and his manner of dealing with foreign governments who crossed him, especially in his later years, was the original "gunboat diplomacy".

=== Crises of 1830 ===
The Revolutions of 1830 gave a jolt to the settled European system that had been created in 1814–1815. The United Kingdom of the Netherlands was rent in half by the Belgian Revolution, the Kingdom of Portugal was the scene of civil war, and the Spanish were about to place an infant princess on the throne. Poland was in arms against the Russian Empire, while the northern powers (Russia, Prussia, and Austria) formed a closer alliance that seemed to threaten the peace and liberties of Europe. Polish exiles called on Britain to intervene against Russia during the November Uprising of 1830.

Palmerston's overall policy was to safeguard British interests, maintain peace, keep the balance of power, and retain the status quo in Europe. He had no grievance against Russia and while he privately sympathised with the Polish cause, in his role as foreign minister he rejected Polish demands. With serious trouble simultaneously taking place in Belgium and Italy, and lesser issues in Greece and Portugal, he sought to de-escalate European tensions rather than aggravate them, favouring a policy of universal non-interventionism. He therefore focused chiefly on achieving a peaceful settlement of the crisis in Belgium.

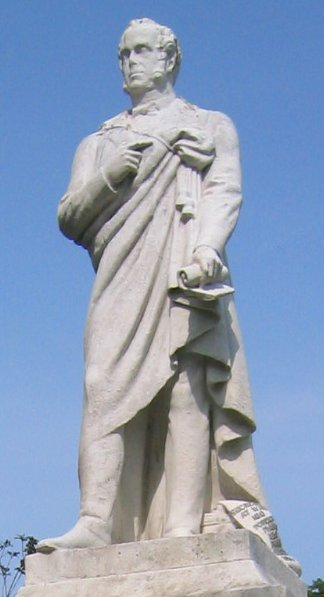
Statue of Palmerston in Southampton

=== Belgium ===
William I of the Netherlands appealed to the great powers that had placed him on the throne after the Napoleonic Wars to maintain his rights. The London Conference of 1830 was called to address this question. The British solution involved the independence of Belgium, which Palmerston believed would greatly contribute to the security of Britain, but any solution was not straightforward. On the one hand, the reactionary powers were anxious to defend William I; on the other, many Belgian revolutionaries, like Charles de Brouckère and Charles Rogier, supported the reunion of the Belgian provinces to France, whereas Britain favoured Dutch, not French influence, on an independent state.

The British policy which emerged was a close alliance with France, but one subject to the balance of power on the Continent, and in particular the preservation of Belgian independence. If the reactionary powers supported William I by force, they would encounter the resistance of France and Britain united in arms. If France sought to annex Belgium, it would forfeit the British alliance and find herself opposed by the whole of Europe. In the end the British policy prevailed. Although the continent had been close to war, peace was maintained on London's terms and Prince Leopold of Saxe-Coburg, the widower of Princess Charlotte, was placed upon the throne of Belgium. Fishman says that the London Conference was "an extraordinarily successful conference" because it "provided the institutional framework through which the leading powers of the time safeguarded the peace of Europe."

Thereafter, despite a Dutch invasion and French counter-invasion in 1831, France and Britain framed and signed a treaty settlement between Belgium and the Netherlands, inducing the three reactionary powers to accede to it as well; while in Palmerston's second period of office, as his authority grew, he was able to finally settle relations between Belgium and Holland with a treaty in 1838–9 – now asserting his (and British) independence by leaning rather more towards the Netherlands and the reactionary powers, and against the Belgium/French axis.

=== France, Spain, and Portugal, 1830s ===
In 1833 and 1834, the youthful Queens Isabella II of Spain and Maria II of Portugal were the representatives and the hope of the constitutional parties of their countries. Their positions were under some pressure from their absolutist kinsmen, Dom Miguel of Portugal and Don Carlos of Spain, who were the closest males in the lines of succession. Palmerston conceived and executed the plan of a Quadruple Alliance of the constitutional states (Britain, France, Spain & Portugal) to serve as a counterpoise to the reactionary alliance. A treaty for the pacification of the Peninsula was signed in London on 22 April 1834 and, although the struggle was somewhat prolonged in Spain, it accomplished its objective.

France had been a reluctant party to the treaty, and never executed its role in it with much zeal. Louis Philippe was accused of secretly favouring the Carlists – the supporters of Don Carlos – and he rejected direct interference in Spain. It is probable that the hesitation of the French court on this question was one of the causes of the enduring personal hostility Palmerston showed towards the French king thereafter, though that sentiment may well have arisen earlier. Although Palmerston wrote in June 1834 that Paris was "the pivot of my foreign policy", the differences between the two countries grew into a constant but sterile rivalry that brought benefit to neither.

=== Balkans and Near East: defending Turkey, 1830s ===
Palmerston was greatly interested by the Eastern question. During the Greek War of Independence he had energetically supported the Greek cause and backed the Treaty of Constantinople that gave Greece its independence. However, from 1830 the defence of the Ottoman Empire became one of the cardinal objects of his policy. He believed in the regeneration of Turkey, as he wrote to Henry Bulwer (Lord Dalling): "All that we hear about the decay of the Turkish Empire, and its being a dead body or a sapless trunk, and so forth, is pure unadulterated nonsense."

His two great aims were to prevent Russia establishing itself on the Bosporus and to prevent France doing likewise on the Nile. He regarded the maintenance of the authority of the Sublime Porte as the chief barrier against both these developments.

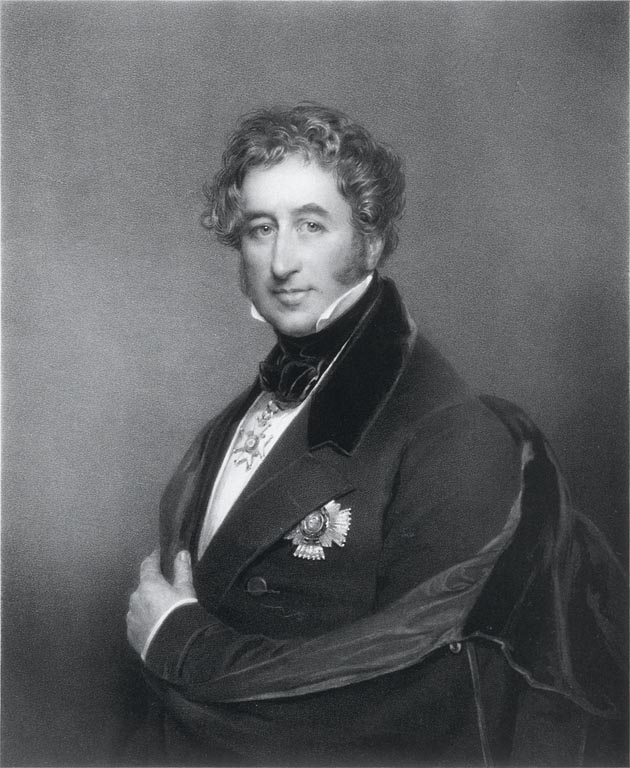
Palmerston (age 50), c. 1830s–1840s

Palmerston had long maintained a suspicious and hostile attitude towards Russia, whose autocratic government offended his liberal principles and whose ever-growing size challenged the strength of the British Empire. He was angered by the 1833 Treaty of Hünkâr İskelesi, a mutual assistance pact between Russia and the Ottomans, but was annoyed and hostile towards David Urquhart, the creator of the Vixen affair, running the Russian blockade of Circassia in the mid-1830s.

For his part, David Urquhart considered Palmerston a "mercenary of Russia" and founded the Free Press magazine in London, where he constantly promoted these views. The permanent author of this magazine was Karl Marx, who stated "from the time of Peter the Great until the Crimean War, there was a secret agreement between the London and St. Petersburg offices, and that Palmerston was a corrupt tool of the Tsar's policy."

Despite his popular reputation, he was hesitant in 1831 about aiding the Sultan Mahmud II, who was under attack from Muhammad Ali, the wali of Egypt. Later, after Russian successes in 1833 and 1835, he made proposals to afford material aid, which were overruled by the cabinet. Palmerston held that "if we can procure for it ten years of peace under the joint protection of the five Powers, and if those years are profitably employed in reorganizing the internal system of the empire, there is no reason whatever why it should not become again a respectable Power." He challenged the metaphor that an old country, such as Turkey, should be in such disrepair as would be warranted by the comparison: "Half the wrong conclusions at which mankind arrive are reached by the abuse of metaphors, and by mistaking general resemblance or imaginary similarity for real identity." However, when the power of Muhammad Ali appeared to threaten the existence of the Ottoman dynasty, particularly given the death of Sultan Mahmud II on 1 July 1839, he succeeded in bringing the great powers together. They signed a collective note on 27 July pledging to maintain the independence and integrity of the Turkish Empire in order to preserve the security and peace of Europe. However, by 1840 Muhammad Ali had occupied Syria and won the Battle of Nezib against the Turkish forces. Lord Ponsonby, the British ambassador at Constantinople, vehemently urged the British government to intervene. Privately, Palmerston explained his views on Muhammad Ali to Lord Granville thus: "Coercion of Mehemet Ali by England if war broke out might appear partial and unjust; but we are partial; and the great interests of Europe require that we should be so... No ideas therefore of fairness towards Mehemet ought to stand in the way of such great and paramount interests." Having closer ties to the wali than most, France refused to be a party to coercive measures against him despite having signed the note in the previous year.

Palmerston, irritated at France's Egyptian policy, signed the London Convention of 15 July 1840 with Austria, Russia, and Prussia – without the knowledge of the French government. This measure was taken with great hesitation, and strong opposition on the part of several members of the cabinet. Palmerston forced the measure through in part by declaring in a letter to the prime minister, Lord Melbourne, that he would resign from the ministry if his policy were not adopted. The London Convention granted Muhammad Ali hereditary rule in Egypt in return for withdrawal from Syria and Lebanon, but this was rejected by the pasha. The European powers intervened with force, and the bombardment of Beirut, the fall of Acre, and the total collapse of Muhammad Ali's power followed in rapid succession. Palmerston's policy was triumphant, and the author of it had won a reputation as one of the most powerful statesmen of the age.

In September 1838, Palmerston appointed a British consul in Jerusalem, without the conventional consultation of the Board of Trade, and gave instruction to assist with the construction of an Anglican church in the city, under the prompting influences of Lord Shaftesbury, a prominent Christian Zionist.

=== China: First Opium War ===
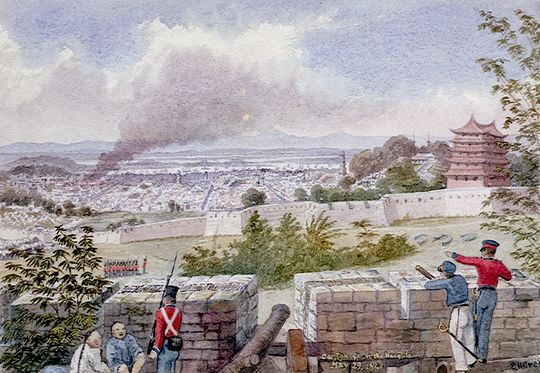
British bombardment of Canton from the surrounding heights, May 1841

China restricted outside trade under the Canton System to only one port and refused all official diplomatic relations except to tributary countries. In 1833–1835, as London ended the East India Company's monopoly on trade with China, both Tory and Whig governments sought to maintain peace and good trade relations. However Lord Napier wanted to provoke a revolution in China that would open trade. The Foreign Office, led by Palmerston, stood opposed and sought peace. The Chinese government refused to change, and interdicted the British smugglers bringing in opium from India, which was banned in China. Britain responded with military force in the First Opium War, 1839–1842, which ended in a decisive British victory. Under the Treaty of Nanjing, China paid an indemnity and opened five treaty ports to world trade. In those ports there would be extraterritorial rights for British citizens. Palmerston thus achieved his main goals of diplomatic equality and opening China to trade. However his angry critics focused on the immorality of the opium trade.

Palmerston's biographer, Jasper Ridley, outlines the government's position:

Conflict between China and Britain was inevitable. On the one side was a corrupt, decadent and caste-ridden despotism, with no desire or ability to wage war, which relied on custom much more than force for the enforcement of extreme privilege and discrimination, and which was blinded by a deep-rooted superiority complex into believing that they could assert their supremacy over Europeans without possessing military power. On the other side was the most economically advanced nation in the world, a nation of pushing, bustling traders, of self-help, free trade, and the pugnacious qualities of John Bull.

An entirely opposite British viewpoint was promoted by humanitarians and reformers such as the Chartists and religious nonconformists led by young William Ewart Gladstone. They argued that Palmerston was only interested in the huge profits it would bring Britain, and was totally oblivious to the horrible moral evils of opium which the Chinese government was valiantly trying to stamp out.

Meanwhile, he manipulated information and public opinion to enhance his control of his department, including controlling communications within the office and to other officials. He leaked secrets to the press, published selected documents, and released letters to give himself more control and more publicity, all the while stirring up British nationalism. He feuded with The Times, edited by Thomas Barnes, which did not play along with his propaganda ploys.

== Marriage ==
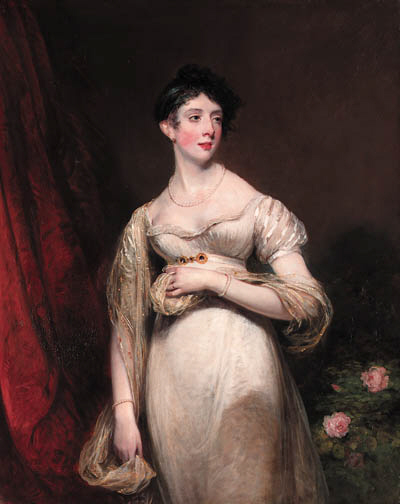
Portrait of Emily Lamb, then Countess Cowper, by William Owen, ca. 1810

In 1839, Palmerston married his paramour of many years, the noted Whig hostess Emily Lamb, widow of Peter Leopold Louis Francis Nassau Clavering-Cowper, 5th Earl Cowper (1778–1837) and sister of William Lamb, 2nd Viscount Melbourne, prime minister (1834 and 1835–1841). They had no legitimate children, although at least one of Lord Cowper's putative children, Lady Emily Cowper, was widely believed to have been fathered by Palmerston. Palmerston resided at Brocket Hall in Hertfordshire, his wife's inheritance. His London townhouse was Cambridge House on Piccadilly in Mayfair.

Emily's son-in-law, Lord Shaftesbury wrote: "His attentions to Lady Palmerston, when they both of them were well stricken in years, were those of a perpetual courtship. The sentiment was reciprocal; and I have frequently seen them go out on a morning to plant some trees, almost believing that they would live to eat the fruit, or sit together under the shade."

Young Queen Victoria found it unseemly that people in their 50s could marry, but the Cowper-Palmerston marriage according to biographer Gillian Gill:

was an inspired political alliance as well as a stab at personal happiness. Harry and Emily were supremely well-matched. As the husband of a beautiful, charming, intelligent, rich woman whose friends were the best people in society, Palmerston at last had the money, the social setting, and the personal security he needed to get to the very top of British politics. Lady Palmerston made her husband happy, as he did her, and she was a political power in her own right. In the last and most successful decades of Palmerston's life, she was his best advisor and most trusted amanuensis. Theirs was one of the great marriages of the century.

== Opposition: 1841–1846 ==
Within a few months Melbourne's administration came to an end (1841) and Palmerston remained out of office for five years. The crisis was past, but the change which took place by the substitution of François Guizot for Adolphe Thiers in France, and of Lord Aberdeen for Palmerston in Britain kept the peace. Palmerston believed that peace with France was not to be relied on, and indeed that war between the two countries was sooner or later inevitable. Aberdeen and Guizot inaugurated a different policy: by mutual confidence and friendly offices, they entirely succeeded in restoring the most cordial understanding between the two governments, and the irritation which Palmerston had inflamed gradually subsided. During the administration of Sir Robert Peel, Palmerston led a retired life, but he attacked with characteristic bitterness the Webster-Ashburton Treaty of 1842 with the United States. It resolved several Canadian boundary disputes with the United States, particularly the border between New Brunswick and the State of Maine and between Canada and the State of Minnesota from Lake Superior and the Lake of the Woods. Much as he criticised it, the treaty successfully closed the border questions with which Palmerston had long been concerned.

Palmerston's reputation as an interventionist and his unpopularity with the Queen were such that Lord John Russell's attempt in December 1845 to form a ministry failed because Lord Grey refused to join a government in which Palmerston would direct foreign affairs. A few months later, however, the Whigs came to power and returned Palmerston to the Foreign Office (July 1846). Russell replied to critics that Palmerston's policies had "a tendency to produce war" but that he had advanced British interests without a major conflict, if not entirely peaceably.

== Foreign Secretary: 1846–1851 ==
Palmerston's years as foreign secretary, 1846–1851, involved dealing with violent upheavals all over Europe; he was dubbed "the gunpowder minister" by his biographer David Brown.

=== France and Spain, 1845 ===
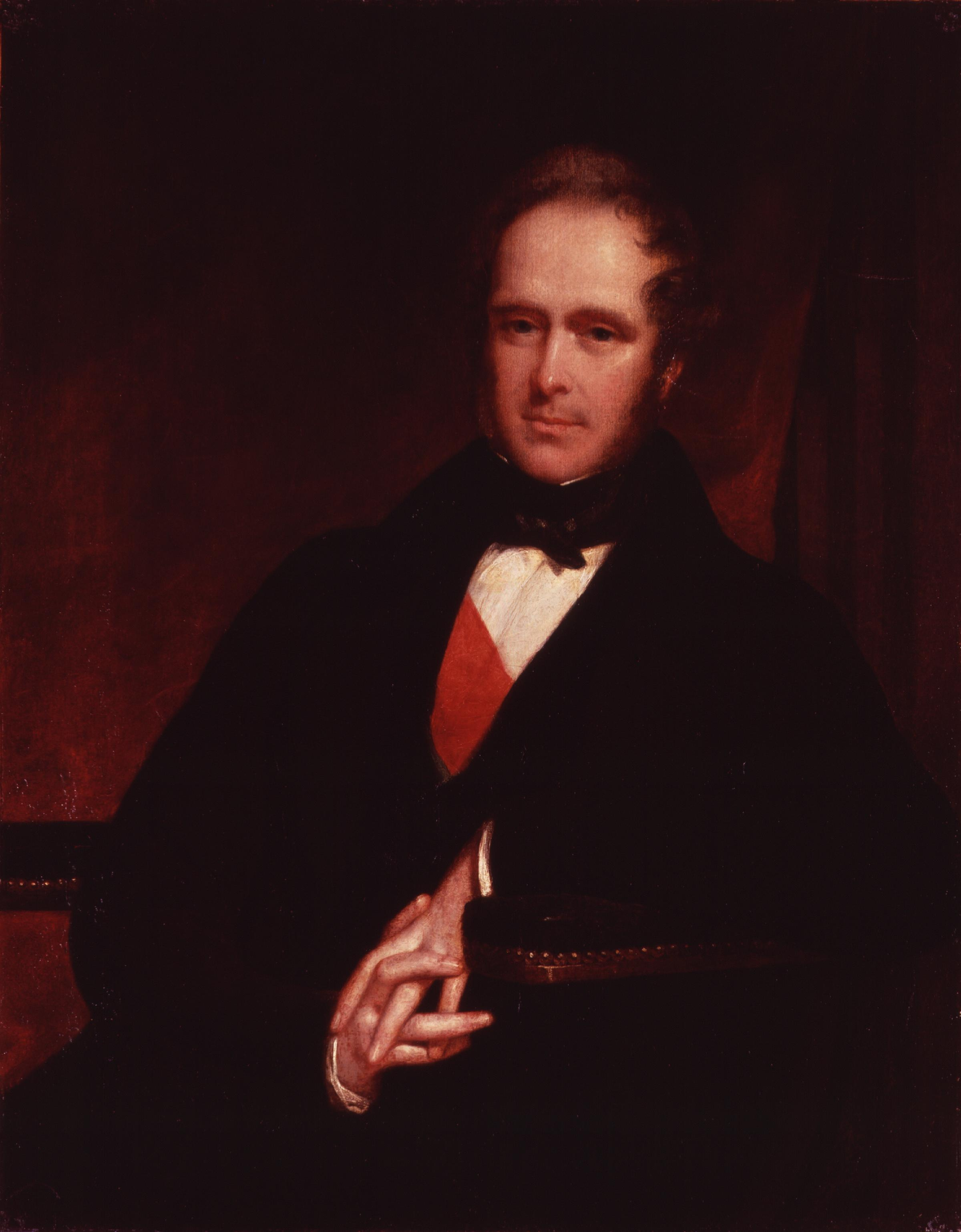
Portrait of Lord Palmerston by John Partridge, c. 1845

The French government regarded the appointment of Palmerston as a certain sign of renewed hostilities. They availed themselves of a dispatch in which he had put forward the name of a Coburg prince as a candidate for the hand of the young queen of Spain as a justification for a departure from the engagements entered into between Guizot and Lord Aberdeen. However little the conduct of the French government in this transaction of the Spanish marriages can be vindicated, it is certain that it originated in the belief that in Palmerston France had a restless and subtle enemy. The efforts of the British minister to defeat the French marriages of the Spanish princesses, by an appeal to the Treaty of Utrecht and the other powers of Europe, were wholly unsuccessful; France won the game, though with no small loss of honourable reputation.`

Historian David Brown rejects the traditional interpretation to the effect that Aberdeen had forged an entente cordiale with France in the early 1840s whereupon the belligerent Palmerston after 1846 destroyed that friendly relationship. Brown argues that as foreign secretary from 1846 to 1851 and subsequently as prime minister, Palmerston sought to maintain the balance of power in Europe, sometimes even aligning with France to do so.

=== Irish Famine ===
As an Anglo-Irish absentee landlord, Palmerston evicted 2,000 of his Irish tenants for non-payment of rent during the Great Irish Famine that ravaged Ireland in the late 1840s. He financed the emigration of starving Irish tenants across the Atlantic to North America as did Petty-Fitzmaurice (Lord Lansdowne) to equal notoriety. Palmerston asserted that "... any great improvement in the social system of Ireland must be founded upon an extensive change in the present state of agrarian occupation [through] a long continued and systematic ejectment of Small holders and of Squatting Cottiers.". According to author John Newsinger, Adam Ferrie, chairman of the Emigration Committee in Canada, regretted “that men pretending to be Christians, and especially British, could be guilty of such barbarity”.

=== Support for revolutions abroad ===
The Revolutions of 1848 spread like a conflagration throughout Europe and shook every throne on the Continent except those of Russian Empire, Ottoman Empire, Spain, and Belgium. Palmerston sympathised openly with the revolutionary party abroad. In particular, he strongly advocated national self-determination and stood firmly on the side of constitutional liberties on the Continent. Despite this, he bitterly opposed Irish independence and was deeply hostile to the Young Ireland movement.

=== Italian independence ===
No state was regarded by him with more aversion than Austria. Yet, his opposition to Austria was chiefly based upon its occupation of northeastern Italy and its Italian policy. Palmerston maintained that the existence of Austria as a great power north of the Alps was an essential element in the system of Europe. Antipathies and sympathies had a large share in the political views of Palmerston, and his sympathies had ever been passionately awakened by the cause of Italian independence. He supported the Sicilians against King Ferdinand II of the Two Sicilies, and even allowed arms to be sent them from the Royal Arsenal, Woolwich. Although he had endeavoured to restrain King Charles Albert of Sardinia from his rash attack on the superior forces of Austria, he obtained for him a reduction of the penalty of defeat. Austria, weakened by the revolution, sent an envoy to London to request the mediation of Britain, based on a large cession of Italian territory. Palmerston rejected the terms he might have obtained for Piedmont. After a couple of years this wave of revolution was replaced by a wave of reaction.

=== Hungarian independence ===
In Hungary, the 1848 war for independence from the Austrian Empire, ruled by the Habsburg dynasty, was defeated by the joint army of Austrian and Russian forces. Prince Schwarzenberg assumed the government of the empire with dictatorial power. In spite of what Palmerston termed his judicious bottle-holding, the movement he had encouraged and applauded, but to which he could give no material aid, was everywhere subdued. The British government, or at least Palmerston as its representative, was regarded with suspicion and resentment by every power in Europe, except the French republic. Even that was shortly afterwards to be alienated by Palmerston's attack on Greece. When Lajos Kossuth, the Hungarian democrat and leader of its constitutionalists, landed in England in 1851 to wide applause, Palmerston proposed to receive him at Broadlands, a design which was only prevented by a peremptory vote of the cabinet.

=== Royal and parliamentary reaction to 1848 ===
This state of things was regarded with the utmost annoyance by the British court and by most of the British ministers. On many occasions, Palmerston had taken important steps without their knowledge, which they disapproved. Over the Foreign Office he asserted and exercised an arbitrary dominion, which the feeble efforts of the Prime Minister could not control. The Queen and the Prince Consort did not conceal their indignation at the fact that they were held responsible for Palmerston's actions by the other courts of Europe.

When Benjamin Disraeli attacked Palmerston's foreign policy, the foreign minister responded to a five-hour speech by Thomas Chisholm Anstey with a five-hour speech of his own, the first of two great speeches in which he laid out a comprehensive defence of his foreign policy and of liberal interventionism more generally. Arguing for domestic political effect, Palmerston declaimed:

I hold that the real policy of England... is to be the champion of justice and right, pursuing that course with moderation and prudence, not becoming the Quixote of the world, but giving the weight of her moral sanction and support wherever she thinks that justice is, and whenever she thinks that wrong has been done.
(...)
Therefore I say that it is a narrow policy to suppose that this country or that is to be marked out as the eternal ally or the perpetual enemy of England. We have no eternal allies, and we have no perpetual enemies. Our interests are eternal and perpetual, and those interests it is our duty to follow.

Russell and the Queen both hoped that the other would take the initiative and dismiss Palmerston; the Queen was dissuaded by her husband Prince Albert, who took the limits of constitutional power very seriously, and Russell by Palmerston's prestige with the people and his competence in an otherwise remarkably inept Cabinet.

=== Don Pacifico affair ===
In 1847, the home of Don Pacifico, a Gibraltarian merchant living in Athens, Greece, was attacked by an antisemitic mob, which included the sons of a Greek government minister. The Greek police did not intervene in the attack, despite being present. Because Don Pacifico was a British subject, the British government expressed concern. In January 1850, Palmerston took advantage of Don Pacifico's claims on the Greek government, and blockaded the port of Piraeus in the Kingdom of Greece. As Greece was under the joint protection of three powers, Russia and France protested against its coercion by the British fleet.

After a memorable debate on 17 June, Palmerston's policy was condemned by a vote of the House of Lords. The House of Commons was moved by John Arthur Roebuck to reverse the rebuke, which it did on 29 June by a majority of 46, after having heard from Palmerston on 25 June. This was the most eloquent and powerful speech he ever delivered, wherein he sought to vindicate not only his claims on the Greek government for Don Pacifico, but his entire administration of foreign affairs.

It was in this speech, which lasted for five hours, that Palmerston made the well-known declaration that a British subject ought everywhere to be protected by the strong arm of the British government against injustice and wrong; comparing the reach of the British Empire to that of the Roman Empire, in which a Roman citizen could walk the earth unmolested by any foreign power. This was the famous civis romanus sum ("I am a citizen of Rome") speech. After this speech, Palmerston's popularity had never been greater.

=== Crossing the Queen and resigning, 1851 ===
Notwithstanding his parliamentary triumph in the Don Pacifico affair, many of his own colleagues and supporters criticised the spirit in which the foreign relations of the Crown were carried on. The Queen addressed a minute to the Prime Minister in which she recorded her dissatisfaction at the manner in which Palmerston evaded the obligation to submit his measures for the royal sanction as failing in sincerity to the Crown. This minute was communicated to Palmerston, who accepted its criticisms.

On 2 December 1851, Louis Napoleon – who had been elected President of France in 1848 – carried out a coup d'état by dissolving the National Assembly and arresting the leading republicans. Palmerston privately congratulated Napoleon on his triumph, noting that Britain's constitution was rooted in history but that France had had five revolutions since 1789, with the French Constitution of 1848 being a "day-before-yesterday tomfoolery which the scatterbrain heads of Marrast and Tocqueville invented for the torment and perplexity of the French nation". However, the Cabinet decided that Britain must be neutral, and so Palmerston requested his officials to be diplomatic. Palmerston's widespread support among the press, educated public opinion, and ordinary Britons caused apprehension and distrust among other politicians and angered the Court. Prince Albert complained Palmerston had sent a dispatch without showing the sovereign. Protesting innocence, Palmerston resigned. Palmerston was weakened because Parliament, where he had great support, was not in session. Palmerston continued to have wide approval among the newspapers, elite opinion, and the middle class voters. His popularity led to distrust among rivals and especially at the Royal Court. His fall demonstrates the lack of power of public opinion in a pre-democratic era. However, Palmerston kept his public support and the growing influence of public opinion steadily increased his political strength in the 1850s and 1860s.

== Home Secretary: 1852–1855 ==
After a brief period of Conservative minority government, the Earl of Aberdeen became Prime Minister (in office 19 December 1852 – 30 January 1855) in a coalition government of Whigs and Peelites (with Russell taking the role of Foreign Secretary and Leader of the House of Commons). It was regarded as impossible for them to form a government without Palmerston, so he was made Home Secretary (28 December 1852). Many people considered this a curious appointment because Palmerston's expertise was so obviously in foreign affairs. A story recounts that after a great wave of strikes swept Northern England, the Queen summoned Palmerston to discuss the situation. When she enquired after the latest news, Palmerston allegedly replied: "There is no definite news, Madam, but it seems certain that the Turks have crossed the Danube".

=== Social reform ===
Palmerston passed the Factory Act 1853, which removed loopholes in previous Factory Acts and outlawed all labour by young persons between 6pm and 6am. He attempted to pass a Bill that confirmed the rights of workers to combine, but the House of Lords rejected it. He introduced the Truck Act which stopped the practice of employers paying workmen in goods instead of money, or forcing them to purchase goods from shops owned by the employers. In August 1853, Palmerston introduced the Smoke Abatement Act in order to combat the increasing smoke from coal fires, a problem greatly aggravated by the Industrial Revolution. He also oversaw the passage of the Vaccination Act 1853 into law, which was introduced as a private member's bill, and which Palmerston persuaded the government to support. The Act made vaccination of children compulsory for the first time. Palmerston outlawed the burying of the dead in churches. The right to bury the dead in churches was held by wealthy families whose ancestors had purchased the right in the past. Palmerston opposed this practice on public-health grounds and ensured that all bodies were buried in a churchyard or public cemetery.

=== Penal reform ===
Palmerston reduced the period in which prisoners could be held in solitary confinement from eighteen months to nine months. He also ended transportation to Tasmania for prisoners by passing the Penal Servitude Act 1853, which also reduced the maximum sentences for most offences. Palmerston passed the Reformatory Schools Act 1854 which gave the Home Secretary powers to send juvenile prisoners to a reformatory school instead of to prison. He was forced to accept an amendment which ensured that the prisoner had to have spent at least three months in jail first. When in October 1854 Palmerston visited Parkhurst gaol and conversed with three boy inmates, he was impressed by their behaviour and ordered that they be sent to a reformatory school. He found the ventilation in the cells unsatisfactory and ordered improvement.

Palmerston strongly opposed Lord John Russell's plans for giving the vote to sections of the urban working-classes. When the Cabinet agreed in December 1853 to introduce a bill during the next session of Parliament in the form which Russell wanted, Palmerston resigned. However, Aberdeen told him that no definite decision on reform had been taken and persuaded Palmerston to return to the Cabinet. The electoral Reform Bill did not pass Parliament that year.

=== Crimean War ===
Palmerston's exile from his traditional realm of the Foreign Office meant he did not have full control over British policy during the events precipitating the Crimean War of 1853–1856. One of his biographers, Jasper Ridley, argues that had he been in control of foreign policy at this time, war in the Crimea would have been avoided. Palmerston argued in Cabinet, after Russian troops concentrated on the Ottoman border in February 1853, that the Royal Navy should join the French fleet in the Dardanelles as a warning to Russia. He was overruled, however.

In May 1853, the Russians threatened to invade the principalities of Wallachia and Moldavia unless the Ottoman sultan acceded to their demands. Palmerston argued for immediate decisive action - that the Royal Navy should be sent to the Dardanelles to assist the Turkish navy and that Britain should inform Russia of London's intention to go to war if the Imperial Russian Army invaded the principalities. However, Aberdeen objected to all of Palmerston's proposals. After prolonged arguments, a reluctant Aberdeen agreed to send a fleet to the Dardanelles but objected to Palmerston's other proposals. The Russian Emperor, Nicholas I, was annoyed by Britain's actions but they did not deter him. When the British fleet arrived at the Dardanelles the weather was rough, so the fleet took refuge in the outer waters of the straits (June 1853). The Russians saw this as a violation of the Straits Convention of 1841; they invaded the two principalities in July 1853. Palmerston interpreted this as the result of British weakness and thought that if the Russians had been told that if they invaded the principalities the British and French fleets would enter the Bosphorus or the Black Sea, they would have been deterred. In Cabinet, Palmerston argued for a vigorous prosecution of the war against Russia by Britain, but Aberdeen objected, as he wanted peace. British public opinion supported the Turks, and with Aberdeen becoming steadily unpopular, Lord Dudley Stuart in February 1854 noted, "Wherever I go, I have heard but one opinion on the subject, and that one opinion has been pronounced in a single word, or in a single name – Palmerston."

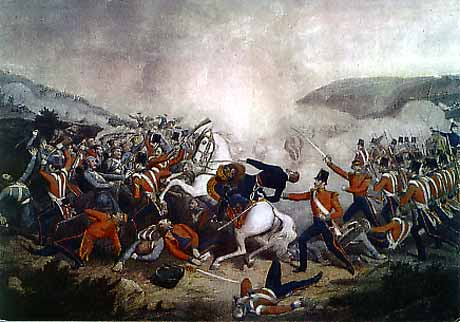
Battle of Inkerman, November 1854

On 28 March 1854, Britain and France declared war on Russia for refusing to withdraw from the principalities. The war progressed slowly, with no Anglo-French gains in the Baltic and slow coalition gains in Crimea at the long Siege of Sevastopol (1854–1855). Dissatisfaction with the conduct of the war grew amongst the public in Britain and in other countries, aggravated by reports of fiascos and failures, especially the mismanagement of the heroic Charge of the Light Brigade at the Battle of Balaclava (25 October 1854). The health and living conditions of the British soldiers became notorious and the press, with correspondents in the field, made the most of the situation. Tories demanded an accounting of all soldiers, cavalry and sailors sent to the Crimea and accurate figures as to the number of casualties. When Parliament passed a bill to investigate by a vote of 305 to 148, Aberdeen said he had lost a vote of no confidence and resigned as prime minister on 30 January 1855.

== First premiership: 1855–1858 ==
=== Appointment and cabinet ===
Queen Victoria deeply distrusted Palmerston and first asked Lord Derby to accept the premiership. Derby offered Palmerston the office of Secretary of State for War, which he accepted under the condition that Lord Clarendon remain as Foreign Secretary. Clarendon refused, and so Palmerston rejected Derby's offer; Derby subsequently gave up trying to form a government. The Queen sent for Lord Lansdowne but (aged 74) he was too old to accept: so she asked Russell; but none of his former colleagues except Palmerston wanted to serve under him. Having exhausted the possible alternatives, the Queen invited Palmerston to Buckingham Palace on 4 February 1855 to form a government.

Aged 70 years, 109 days, Palmerston became the oldest person in British political history to be appointed Prime Minister for the first time. As of 2026 no Prime Minister entering 10 Downing Street for the first time since Palmerston has surpassed his record. Clarendon continued at the foreign office. The War Department was reorganised and the position of "Secretary at War" was merged with the position of Secretary of State for the Colonies. However, when a committee of inquiry chaired by MP John Roebuck was established to examine the misdirection of the war in Crimea became evident, Palmerston was forced to "practically accept" it and this immediately led to the resignations of Lord Herbert and Gladstone. In turn their position were taken over with G. C. Lewis at the Exchequer and Sir Charles Wood as First Lord of the Admiralty.

The public welcomed Palmerston's appointment as Prime Minister, believing he would safeguard Britain's war aims and national honour. Political circles were less enthusiastic: John Bright was critical and dismissive: "Palmerston Prime Minister? What a hoax! the aged charlatan ambition." His wife noted, "I fear he is not popular, except out of doors among the people, who say he is a true Englishman." Though some doubted his abilities, he was respected among the ruling elite and admired by the middle classes. MPs initially resisted his premiership, rejecting his request to forgo the inquiry into the war's conduct. Benjamin Disraeli exaggerated Palmerston’s frailties, calling him "an imposter… an old painted pantaloon, very deaf, very blind, and with false teeth which would fall out of his mouth when speaking". In reality, while his eyesight weakened and gout troubled him, he retained remarkable stamina, often outlasting colleagues in Parliament, riding to hounds, and taking long country walks. Despite concerns, he proved resilient, defying expectations and leading with energy.

=== Ending the Crimean War ===
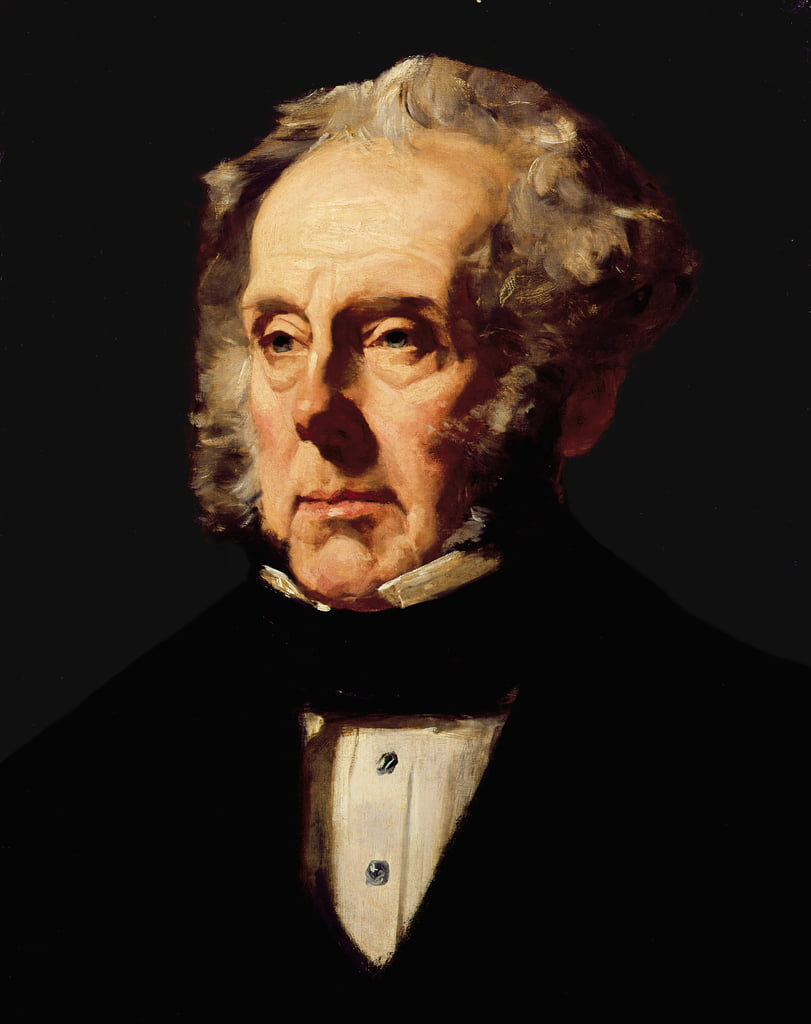
Lord Palmerston, c. 1855 by Francis Cruikshank

Palmerston took a hard line on the war; he wanted to expand the fighting, especially in the Baltic where St. Petersburg could be threatened by superior British naval power. His goal was to permanently reduce the Russian threat to Europe. If Sweden and Prussia were willing to join, Russia would stand alone. However, France, which had sent far more soldiers to the war than Britain, and had suffered far more casualties, wanted the war to end, as did Austria. In March 1855 the old Tsar died and was succeeded by his son, Alexander II, who wished to make peace. However, Palmerston found the peace terms too soft on Russia and so persuaded Napoleon III to break off the peace negotiations until Sevastopol could be captured, putting the allies in a stronger negotiating position. In September Sevastopol finally surrendered and the allies had full control of the Black Sea theatre. Russia came to terms. On 27 February 1856 an armistice was signed and after a month's negotiations an agreement was signed at the Congress of Paris. Palmerston's demand for a demilitarised Black Sea was secured, although his wish for the Crimea to be returned to the Ottomans was not. The peace treaty was signed on 30 March 1856. In April 1856 Palmerston was appointed to the Order of the Garter by Victoria.

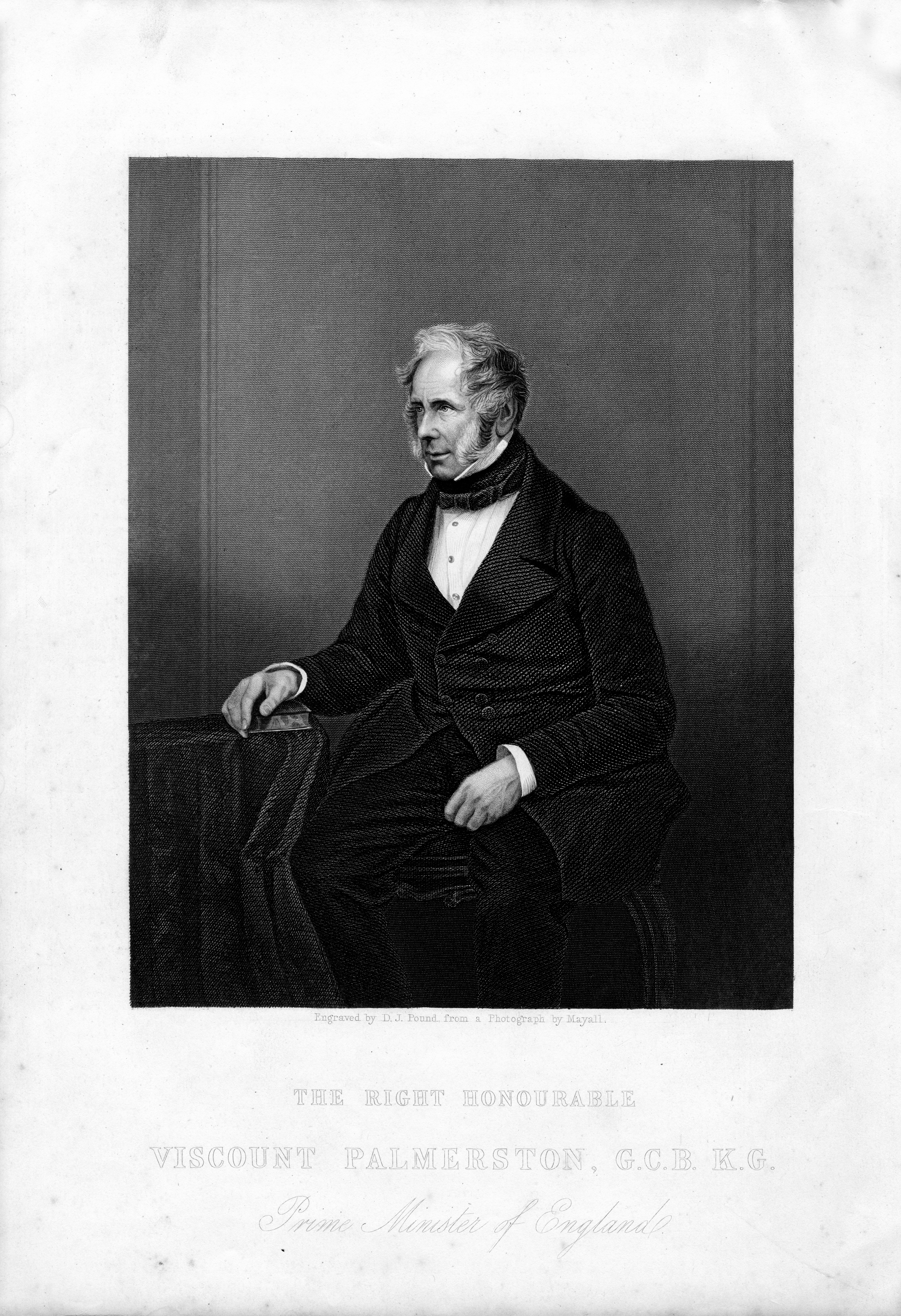
Original engraving by D. J. Pound, from a photograph by Mayall, the Right Honourable Viscount Palmerston, G.C.B. K.G., Prime Minister. From the "Supplement to the Illustrated News of the World" ca 1855–58.

=== China: Arrow controversy and the Second Opium War ===
In October 1856, the Chinese seized the pirate ship Arrow, and in the process, according to the local British official Harry Smith Parkes, insulted the British flag. When the Chinese Commissioner Ye Mingchen refused to apologise, the British shelled his compound. The commissioner retaliated with a proclamation that called on the people of Canton to "unite in exterminating these troublesome English villains" and offered a $100 bounty for the head of any Englishman. The British factories outside the city were also burned to the ground by incensed locals. Palmerston supported Parkes while in Parliament the British policy was strongly attacked on moral grounds by Richard Cobden and William Ewart Gladstone. Playing the patriotism card, Palmerston said that Cobden demonstrated "an anti-English feeling, an abnegation of all those ties which bind men to their country and to their fellow countrymen, which I should hardly have expected from the lips of any member of this House. Everything that was English was wrong, and everything that was hostile to England was right." He went on to say that if a motion of censure was carried it would signal that the House had voted to "abandon a large community of British subjects at the extreme end of the globe to a set of barbarians – a set of kidnapping, murdering, poisoning barbarians." The censure motion was carried by a majority of sixteen and the election of 1857 followed. Palmerston's stance proved popular among a large section of the workers, the growing middle classes and the country's commercial and financial interests. With the expanded franchise, his party swept on a wave of popular feeling to a majority of 83, the largest since 1835. Cobden and John Bright lost their seats.

In China, the Second Opium War (1856–1860) was another humiliating defeat for a Qing dynasty, already reeling as a result of the domestic Taiping Rebellion. In 1858, British troops led by Lord Elgin bombarded the city of Canton and the conflict was concluded at the Treaty of Tientsin. In 1860, following a reconciliation with Napoleon III and strengthening of Anglo-French relation, a joint expedition was launched into China by British and French forces under the commands of General Sir Hope Grant and Count Palikao. After a series of successful battles, Peking was captured.

=== Domestic policy ===
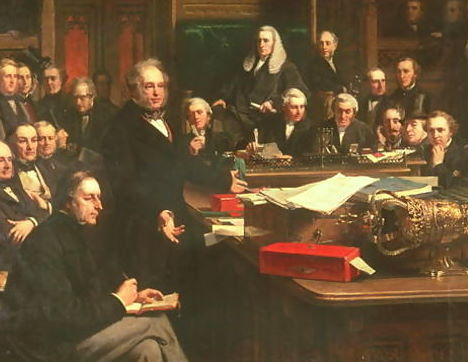
Lord Palmerston Addressing the House of Commons During the Debates on the Treaty of France in February 1860, as painted by John Phillip (1863)

After the election, Palmerston passed the Matrimonial Causes Act 1857, which for the first time made it possible for courts to grant a divorce and removed divorce from the jurisdiction of the ecclesiastical courts. The opponents in Parliament, who included Gladstone, were the first in British history to try to kill a bill by filibuster. Nonetheless, Palmerston was determined to get the bill through, which he did.

=== Indian Mutiny of 1857 ===
In June news came to Britain of the Indian Rebellion of 1857. On 19 May, mentions of the rebellion was raised by Lord Ellenborough during a debate in the House of Lords, in which he questioned whether the Secretary of State for War, Lord Panmure, on whether he "recently viewed" the news of the uprising. Panmure replied that "intelligence recently received from India had not been such as to create any apprehension in the minds of Her Majesty's Ministers for the safety of our Indian empire." Palmerston, who by now was highly popular among the British public and seen as "invincible" due to him leading the government through in times of crisis, did not take the rebellion seriously and was initially sceptical of British troops being defeated by what he considered "native rabble". He particularly opposed the Governor-General, Lord Canning's attempts to divert troops heading to China back to India.

When the severity of the situation was finally realized, Palmerston was immediate in sending troops to quell the revolt, ignoring fears it would leave the homeland more vulnerable. Palmerston approved a suggestion to set a date for a day of "National Prayer and Humiliation" following a precedent established during the Crimean War. The Queen approved of the proposal and Palmerston planned the day alongside the Archbishop of Canterbury, John Bird Sumner on 7 October.

Palmerston sent Sir Colin Campbell and reinforcements to India. Palmerston also agreed to transfer the authority of the East India Company (EIC) to the Crown. Within three months of the rebellion around 30,000 troops were deployed to India. At the urging of the Queen, Palmerston consulted with the Duke of Cambridge on further measures and sent two regiments of foot to Madras and two companies of artillery to each province.

Much of the fighting, prior to the arrival of reinforcements, were carried by the army stationed in India and within months Delhi was captured by company forces and reinforcements from the mutineers.

A bill was introduced to Parliament to alter the governance of India, which by then have been under the rule of the EIC, that would bring the control of Indian affairs under the oversight of a Board of Control under the British government. The bill was passed by a unexpectedly large majority of 145. This was enacted in the Government of India Act 1858. This ended company rule in India which was established in 1757.

=== Orsini affair and resignation ===
After the Italian republican Felice Orsini tried to assassinate the French emperor with a bomb made in Britain, the French were outraged. The French demanded that no such people be granted asylum in the country and the French ambassador was ordered to make presentations regarding the incident to Parliament. In order to preserve good relations with France, Palmerston introduced a Conspiracy to Murder bill, which made it a felony to plot in Britain to murder someone abroad. The condemnation of British conduct was sharply criticised by the French media and the use of bitter tongue by French army officers when receiving the French emperor as a delegacy, led to anger among the British public. Lord Derby exploited the resentment of the British people to propose a amendment to the bill. At first reading, the Conservatives voted for it but at second reading they voted against it. Palmerston lost by nineteen votes. Therefore, in February 1858 he was forced to resign.

== Opposition: 1858–1859 ==
The Conservatives lacked a majority, and Russell introduced a resolution in March 1859 arguing for widening the franchise, which the Conservatives opposed but which was carried. Parliament was dissolved and a general election ensued, which the Whigs won. Palmerston rejected an offer from Disraeli to become Conservative leader, but he attended the meeting of 6 June 1859 in Willis's Rooms at St James's Street, where the Liberal Party was formed. The Queen asked Lord Granville to form a government, but although Palmerston agreed to serve under him, Russell did not. Therefore, on 12 June the Queen asked Palmerston to become prime minister. Russell and Gladstone agreed to serve under him.

== Second premiership: 1859–1865 ==
Lord Palmerston's second Cabinet held power until his death in 1865. This was a lengthy duration attributable to two key elements: the consistent electoral fragility of the Tory party, and the formal merger of the Peelites, Whigs, and Radicals into the cohesive Liberal party. On the domestic front, Palmerston's firm Whig and aristocratic convictions stalled any progression toward broader political democracy, compelling more reform-minded figures, particularly Gladstone, to defer major reform legislation until after Palmerston's death. In foreign affairs, the administration was notable for backing Cavour's efforts to unify Italy and for maintaining neutrality in the American Civil War, despite his sympathy for the Confederacy. Historians usually regard Palmerston, starting in 1859, as the first Liberal prime minister.

=== Domestic policy ===
In his second premiership, Palmerston oversaw the passage of important legislation. The Offences against the Person Act 1861 codified and reformed the law, and was part of a wider process of consolidating criminal law. The Companies Act 1862 was the basis of modern company law. The Union Chargeability Act 1865 which overhauled and reformed the poor laws. Palmerston established the Newcastle Commission in 1859 which looked into the inadequacies of public education and led to increases in school funding in the Revised Code of 1862. Palmerston's policies toward Ireland was more based on practical sense rather than radical change. He was firmly opposed to a measure by Gladstone that would have created a legal fixture on land tenure. Various laws aimed at regulating and improving working conditions were also introduced.

Palmerston's second government was notable for its active and productive legislative work, which was able to absolve it of any charge of useless indolence, despite Palmerston and his cabinet not introducing far reaching innovative reform. The parliamentary budgets introduced by Gladstone were enough to demonstrate the effectiveness of the ministry and the annual Queen's Speeches at the end of each parliamentary session, showed promising modest reforms by both houses of parliament that were exceptionally useful such as prisons bills, partnership liability bills, crime chargeability bills and so on. His Lord Chancellor Lord Westbury, proved to be one of the "greatest of the modern reform Lord Chancellors" with rigorous attempts at reform the legal system, despite falling short on his ambitions with his plans for land transfers and title registration not being fully realised.

Unlike any of his reform-minded colleagues, Palmerston opposed further extending the vote, which led many even in his own cabinet to accuse him of being a "Tory in disguise". According to biographer Lloyd Charles Sanders, the fact that Palmerston held "such a body of men together until his death, with less than average number of resignations, is perhaps the greatest of his feats as a parliamentary manager." Russell's support for lowering the voting franchise and redistribution of seats proved to be less urgent compared to the Gladstone's tense opposition to increasing military expenditure. Palmerston resolved the situation by allowing Russell to introduce a reform bill, which lowered the voting franchise from £10 to £6 and redistributed 25 parliamentary seats. However, a lack of public interest and disinterest from Parliament itself led to the bill's eventual demise in committee. Following the bill's failure, Benjamin Disraeli pointed that Palmerston was "not so much in support of, as about" the reform bill and in Palmerston's reports to the Queen he made "little or no attempt to conceal his satisfaction as its approaching demise."

Scandal broke over revelations misdeeds done by Lord Westbury during his final months as lord chancellor. The controversy did not impact the government which was shown during the election of 1865 when the public returned the government with a substantial majority. Palmerston's own handling of patronage—both secular and ecclesiastical—according to Lord Shaftesbury were "compelling". His appointments of bishops for ecclesiastical positions were controversial among the High church faction and Bishop Samuel Wilberforce, who opposed Palmerston's appointments due to many of the bishops belonging to the Evangelical wing of the Church of England, known as "Shaftesbury bishops". In 1859, Palmerston's alliance with the Peelites led to his appointments becoming more inclusive which favoured candidates based on merit regardless of theological affiliation.

=== Foreign policy ===
Foreign policy continued to be his main strength; he thought that he could shape if not control all of European diplomacy, especially by using France as a vital ally and trade partner. However, historians often characterise his method as bluffing more than decisive action.

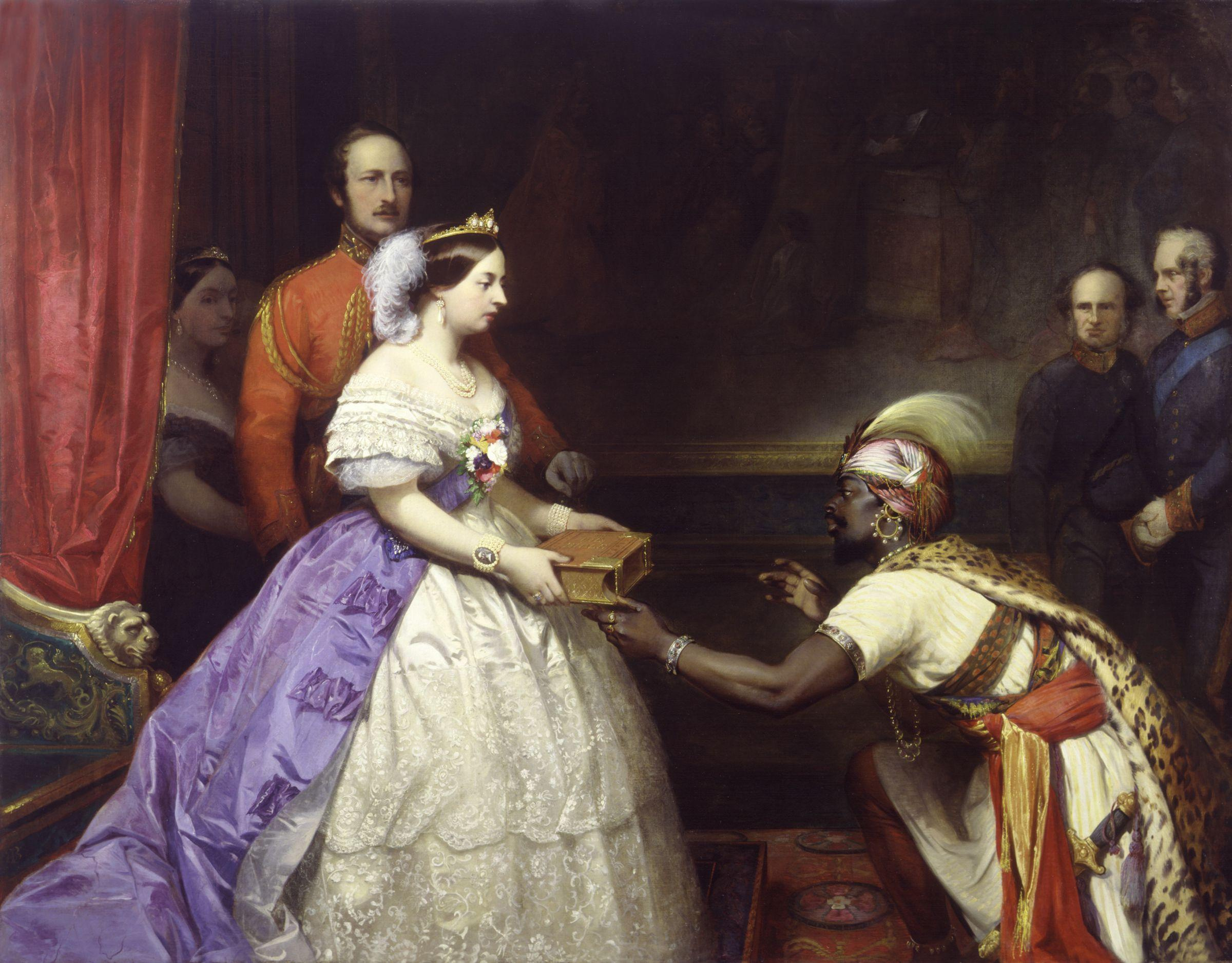
Palmerston, Lord Russell and Prince Albert looking on as Queen Victoria presents a Bible to an African ruler who is bowing down before her

Some people called Palmerston a womaniser; The Times named him Lord Cupid (on account of his youthful looks), and he was cited, at the age of 79, as co-respondent in an 1863 divorce case, although it emerged that the case was nothing more than an attempted blackmail.

=== Relationship with Gladstone ===
Although Palmerston and William Ewart Gladstone treated each other respectfully, they disagreed fundamentally over Church appointments, foreign affairs, defence and reform; Palmerston's greatest problem during his last premiership was how to handle his Chancellor of the Exchequer. The MP Sir William Henry Gregory was told by a member of the Cabinet that "at the beginning of each session and after each holiday, Mr Gladstone used to come in charged to the muzzle with all sorts of schemes of all sorts of reforms which were absolutely necessary in his opinion to be immediately undertaken. Palmerston used to look fixedly at the paper before him, saying nothing until there was a lull in Gladstone's outpouring. He then rapped the table and said cheerfully: 'Now, my Lords and gentlemen, let us go to business'." Palmerston told Lord Shaftesbury: "Gladstone will soon have it all his own way and whenever he gets my place we shall have strange doings". He told another friend that he thought Gladstone would wreck the Liberal Party and end up in a madhouse.

When in May 1864 the MP Edward Baines introduced a Reform Bill in the Commons, Palmerston ordered Gladstone to not commit himself and the government to any particular scheme. Instead Gladstone said in his speech in the Commons that he did not see why any man should not have the vote unless he was mentally incapacitated, but added that this would not come about unless the working class showed an interest in reform. Palmerston believed that this was incitement to the working class to begin agitating for reform and told Gladstone: "What every Man and Woman too have a Right to, is to be well governed and under just Laws, and they who propose a change ought to shew that the present organization does not accomplish those objects".

French intervention in Italy had created an invasion scare and Palmerston established a Royal Commission on the Defence of the United Kingdom which reported in 1860. It recommended a huge programme of fortifications to protect the Royal Navy Dockyards and ports, which Palmerston vigorously supported. Objecting to the enormous expense, Gladstone repeatedly threatened to resign as Chancellor when the proposals were accepted. Palmerston said that he had received so many resignation letters from Gladstone that he feared that they would set fire to the chimney.

=== Finances ===
The financial policy of Palmerston's government was heavily centred around the budgets of Gladstone and was marked by tensions between Palmerston and Gladstone. Palmerston, who feared an imminent French invasion, wanted substantial increases in military defences, which clashed with Gladstone's committed to reducing public spending and pursuing free trade principles. One of the major fiscal measures proposed by Gladstone was the repeal of paper duties, a proposal which encountered stiff opposition from Palmerston within the Cabinet, who was not in favour of removing such duties, and from the House of Lords, which ultimately rejected the measure. Palmerston privately viewed the rejection of the repeal as a beneficial act, stating that the Lords had "performed a good public service" by blocking the measure.

In addition to paper duties, Gladstone's budget of 1860 also introduced the first graduated income tax in Britain with renewing at varying rate (ten pence in the pound for incomes above £150 and seven pence for incomes above £100) and extended the license system to include wine-refreshment houses. The reform was in line with Gladstone's broader goal of reducing protectionist measures and promoting free trade policies. Gladstone expected increased receipts in the future from reduced duties, however, he retained full duties on sugar and tea was income tax placed at ten pence. However, the Budget was not without controversy. While Gladstone celebrated the measures within the budget as a triumph, Palmerston remained focused on national defence, which was at odds with Gladstone's fiscal austerity. The conflict between the two men was especially evident in their differing views on public expenditure. Palmerston wanted funding for ironclad warships and fortifications to protect Britain's coastal ports, such as Portsmouth and Plymouth, which he considered crucial for national security.

However, the budget was hailed as the greatest "free trade budget" since Sir Robert Peel's time. During this period, exports of home produce surged from £113 million in 1842 to £363 million in 1865 while imports grew from £65 million to £181 million. The import of essential goods like butter, bacon, and rice which were negligible at 8,355 cwts in 1842, surged to an 713,346 cwts high by 1865. Similarly, egg imports soared from under one million to nearly four million. The export of foreign and colonial produce experienced an equal increase, from £18 million in 1842 to £52 million by1865. The expansion of exports in manufactured goods also so an increase with cotton exports almost tripling, while machinery exports growing by tenfold, woollen yarn exports increasing eightfold, and items like linen, silk, hardware, leather, and iron and steel showed exponential growth, with many of these sectors seeing four to sixfold increases. Haberdashery also exports multiplied sevenfold. These advancements were bolstered by the repeal of the navigation laws, which facilitated a threefold increase in British shipping tonnage entered with cargo, from 5.4 million tons in 1842 to 17.4 million in 1865. Foreign tonnage also surged, growing from 1.9 million to 7.5 million tons during the same period. The steamship industry, a testament to technological progress, saw tonnage rise from 186,687 in 1851 to 823,533 by 1865, more than quadrupling.

Gladstone, however, increasingly found it difficult to reconcile his role as Chancellor with the pressure to fund Palmerston's defence initiatives. The growing defence budget, including proposed expenditures for the military, led to frequent clashes between the two. Gladstone felt that the increasing military costs were excessive and detrimental to the nation's finances. At one point, he even threatened to resign on multiple occasions over the issue, expressing his frustration with Palmerston's disregard for fiscal discipline. Despite these tensions, Palmerston remained steadfast in his belief that military preparedness was paramount, going so far as to tell the Queen that it would be better to lose Gladstone than to compromise Britain's defence capabilities.

=== Relationship with Lord Lyons ===
During the advent and occurrence of the American Civil War, the British Ambassador to the United States was Palmerston's close friend and ally Richard Lyons, 2nd Baron Lyons. Palmerston had first appointed Richard Lyons to the Foreign Service in 1839, and was a close friend of his father, Edmund Lyons, 1st Baron Lyons, with whom he had vehemently advocated increased aggression in the Crimean War. Palmerston and Lyons both had similar sociopolitical sympathies: both advocated monarchy and foreign interventionism. Throughout the American Civil War, Palmerston and Richard Lyons maintained an extensive confidential correspondence. Their actions were responsible for the peaceful resolution of the Trent Affair. When Lyons resigned from the position of American Ambassador, Palmerston attempted to persuade him to return, but Lyons declined the offer.

=== American Civil War ===
Palmerston's sympathies in the American Civil War (1861–65) were with the secessionist Confederate States of America. Although a professed opponent of the Atlantic slave trade and slavery, he held a lifelong hostility towards the United States, and believed a dissolution of the Union would enhance British power. Additionally, the Confederacy "would afford a valuable and extensive market for British manufactures".

Britain issued a proclamation of neutrality at the beginning of the Civil War on 13 May 1861. The Confederacy was recognised as a belligerent but it was too premature to recognise it as a sovereign state. The United States Secretary of State, William Seward, threatened to treat as hostile any country which recognised the Confederacy. Britain depended more on American corn than Confederate cotton, and a war with the U.S. would not be in Britain's economic interest. Palmerston ordered reinforcements sent to the Province of Canada because he was convinced the North would make peace with the South and then invade Canada. He was very pleased with the Confederate victory at the First Battle of Bull Run in July 1861, but 15 months later he felt:

"...the American War... has manifestly ceased to have any attainable object as far as the Northerns are concerned, except to get rid of some more thousand troublesome Irish and Germans. It must be owned, however, that the Anglo-Saxon race on both sides have shown courage and endurance highly honourable to their stock."

The Trent Affair in November 1861 produced public outrage in Britain and a diplomatic crisis. A U.S. Navy warship stopped the British steamer Trent and seized two Confederate envoys en route to Europe. Palmerston called the action "a declared and gross insult", demanded the release of the two diplomats and ordered 3,000 troops to Canada. In a letter to Queen Victoria on 5 December 1861 he said that if his demands were not met:

"Great Britain is in a better state than at any former time to inflict a severe blow upon and to read a lesson to the United States which will not soon be forgotten."

In another letter to his foreign secretary, he predicted war between Britain and the Union:

"It is difficult not to come to the conclusion that the rabid hatred of England which animates the exiled Irishmen who direct almost all the Northern newspapers, will so excite the masses as to make it impossible for Lincoln and Seward to grant our demands; and we must therefore look forward to war as the probable result."

In fact, Irishmen did not control any major newspapers in the North, and the U.S. decided to release the prisoners rather than risk war. Palmerston was convinced the presence of troops in Canada persuaded the U.S. to acquiesce.

After President Abraham Lincoln's announcement in September 1862 that he would issue an Emancipation Proclamation in ninety days, the cabinet debated intervention as a humanitarian move to stop a likely race war. At the same time however there was a cabinet crisis in France over the overthrow of the Greek king and the growing Eastern question with regard to Russia. The British Government had to determine whether the situation in North America or the containment of Russia was more urgent. The decision was to give priority to threats closer to home and to decline France's suggestion of a joint intervention in America; the threatened race war over slavery never happened. Palmerston rejected all further efforts of the Confederacy to gain British recognition.

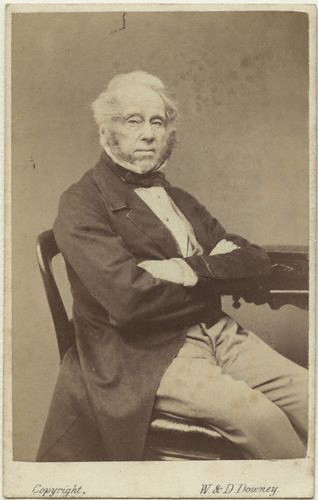
Carte de visite depicting Palmerston, 1863

The raiding ship CSS Alabama, built in the British port of Birkenhead, was another difficulty for Palmerston. On 29 July 1862, a law officer's report he had commissioned advised him to detain Alabama, as its construction was a breach of Britain's neutrality. Palmerston ordered Alabama detained on 31 July, but it had already put to sea before the order reached Birkenhead. In her subsequent cruise, Alabama captured or destroyed many Union merchant ships, as did other raiders fitted out in Britain. This was the basis of the postwar Alabama claims for damages against Britain, which Palmerston refused to pay. After his death, Gladstone acknowledged the U.S. claim and agreed to arbitration, paying out $15,500,000 in damages. However, no compensation for damages done to the U.S. by British-built blockade runners carrying arms supplies to the Confederacy was offered.

=== Denmark ===
The Prussian Prime Minister Otto von Bismarck wanted to annex the Danish Duchy of Schleswig and the neighboring German Duchy of Holstein, whose Duke was the King of Denmark, chiefly for its port of Kiel, and had an alliance with Austria for this purpose. This was part of the longstanding Schleswig–Holstein question. In a speech to the Commons on 23 July 1863, Palmerston said the British government, like those of France and Russia, wished that "the independence, the integrity, and the rights of Denmark may be maintained. We are convinced—I am convinced at least—that if any violent attempt were made to overthrow those rights and interfere with that independence, those who made the attempt would find in the result that it would not be Denmark alone with which they would have to contend". Palmerston's stance derived from the traditional belief that France was the greater threat to Britain and was much stronger than Austria and Prussia. In any case, France and Britain were at odds over Poland, and Paris refused to cooperate with London on the Danish crisis. Public opinion in Britain was strongly pro-Danish, thanks especially to the Danish princess who married the Prince of Wales. However Queen Victoria was intensely pro-German and strongly urged against threatening war. Palmerston himself favoured Denmark but he also had long been pacifistic in this matter and did not want Britain to become militarily involved.

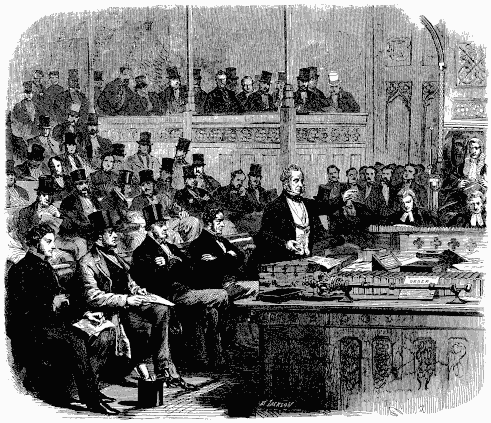
Palmerston addressing the House of Commons on the eve of the Dano-Prussian War in 1864.

For five months Bismarck did nothing. However, in November the Danish government instituted a new constitution whereby Schleswig was bound closer to Denmark. By the year's end, the Prussian and Austrian armies had occupied Holstein and were massing on the River Eider, the border with Schleswig. On 1 February 1864, the Prussian-Austrian armies invaded Schleswig, and ten days afterwards the Danish government requested British help to resist this. Russell urged Palmerston to send a fleet to Copenhagen and persuade Napoleon III that he should mobilise his French soldiers on the borders of Prussia.

Palmerston replied that the fleet could not do much to assist the Danes in Copenhagen and that nothing should be done to persuade Napoleon to cross the Rhine. Britain had a small army and it had no powerful ally to help. Bismarck remarked that the Royal Navy lacked wheels—it was powerless on land where the war would be fought. In April Austria's navy was on its way to attack Copenhagen. Palmerston told the Austrian ambassador that if his fleet entered the Baltic to attack Denmark the result would be war with Britain. The ambassador replied that the Austrian navy would not enter the Baltic and it did not do so.

Palmerston accepted Russell's suggestion that the war should be settled at a conference, but at the ensuing London Conference of 1864 in May and June the Danes refused to accept their loss of Schleswig-Holstein. The armistice ended on 26 June and Prussian-Austrian troops quickly invaded more of Denmark. On 25 June the Cabinet was against going to war to save Denmark, and Russell's suggestion to send the Royal Navy to defend Copenhagen was only carried by Palmerston's vote. Palmerston, however, said the fleet could not be sent in view of the deep division in the Cabinet.

On 27 June, Palmerston gave his statement to the Commons and said Britain would not go to war with the German powers unless the existence of Denmark as an independent power was at stake or Denmark's capital was threatened. The Conservatives replied that Palmerston had betrayed the Danes and a vote of censure in the House of Lords was carried by nine votes. In the debate in the Commons the Conservative MP General Jonathan Peel said: "It is come to this, that the words of the Prime Minister of England, uttered in the Parliament of England, are to be regarded as mere idle menaces to be laughed at and despised by foreign powers." Palmerston replied in the last night of the debate: "I say that England stands as high as she ever did and those who say she had fallen in the estimation of the world are not the men to whom the honour and dignity of England should be confided".

The vote of censure was defeated by 313 votes to 295, with Palmerston's old enemies in the pacifist camp, Cobden and Bright, voting for him. The result of the vote was announced at 2:30 in the morning, and when Palmerston heard the news he ran up the stairs to the Ladies' Gallery and embraced his wife. Disraeli wrote: "What pluck to mount those dreadful stairs at three o'clock in the morning, and eighty years of age!"

In a speech at his constituency at Tiverton in August, Palmerston told his constituents:

I am sure every Englishman who has a heart in his breast and a feeling of justice in his mind, sympathizes with those unfortunate Danes (cheers), and wishes that this country could have been able to draw the sword successfully in their defence (continued cheers); but I am satisfied that those who reflect on the season of the year when that war broke out, on the means which this country could have applied for deciding in one sense that issue, I am satisfied that those who make these reflections will think that we acted wisely in not embarking in that dispute. (Cheers.) To have sent a fleet in midwinter to the Baltic every sailor would tell you was an impossibility, but if it could have gone it would have been attended by no effectual result. Ships sailing on the sea cannot stop armies on land, and to have attempted to stop the progress of an army by sending a fleet to the Baltic would have been attempting to do that which it was not possible to accomplish. (Hear, hear.) If England could have sent an army, and although we all know how admirable that army is on the peace establishment, we must acknowledge that we have no means of sending out a force at all equal to cope with the 300,000 or 400,000 men whom the 30,000,000 or 40,000,000 of Germany could have pitted against us, and that such an attempt would only have insured a disgraceful discomfiture—not to the army, indeed, but to the Government which sent out an inferior force and expected it to cope successfully with a force so vastly superior. (Cheers.) ... we did not think that the Danish cause would be considered as sufficiently British, and as sufficiently bearing on the interests and the security and the honour of England, as to make it justifiable to ask the country to make those exertions which such a war would render necessary.

Europe's leaders were unable to settle the matter by peaceful compromise. Palmerston's biographer William Baring Pemberton argued that his "failure to understand Bismarck lies at the root of his misunderstanding of the Schleswig-Holstein question, and it derived from an old man's inability to adapt himself to a changing world". Thus Britain was militarily unable to stop Bismarck's armies and misunderstood Bismarck's ambitions. Russian historian V. N. Vinogradov writes: "In place of the former insight came bias in judgments and stubbornness in defending outdated views. Palmerston continued to consider Prussia 'an instrument in the hands of Austria', its army weak and doomed to defeat, and its public to consist of romantically minded students and dreamy professors. And Otto von Bismarck quietly annexed the two Duchies to Prussia, and at the same time the County of Lauenburg".

=== Electoral victory ===
Palmerston won another general election in July 1865, increasing his majority. The leadership of Palmerston was a great electoral asset to the Liberal Party. He then had to deal with the outbreak of Fenian violence in Ireland. Palmerston ordered the Viceroy of Ireland, Lord Wodehouse, to take measures against this, including a possible suspension of trial-by-jury and a monitoring of Americans travelling to Ireland. He believed that the Fenian agitation was caused by America. On 27 September 1865 he wrote to the Secretary for War:

The American assault on Ireland under the name of Fenianism may be now held to have failed, but the snake is only scotched and not killed. It is far from impossible that the American conspirators may try and obtain in our North American provinces compensation for their defeat in Ireland.

He advised that more armaments be sent to Canada and more troops be sent to Ireland. During these last few weeks of his life, Palmerston pondered on developments in foreign affairs. He began thinking of a new friendship with France as "a sort of preliminary defensive alliance" against the United States and looked forward to Prussia becoming more powerful as this would balance against the growing threat from Russia. In a letter to Russell he warned that Russia "will in due time become a power almost as great as the old Roman Empire ... Germany ought to be strong in order to resist Russian aggression."

At eighty, Palmerston continued leading the country, though despite being acutely aware of the changing tides that would define the coming age. Reflecting on his eventual successor, Palmerston predicted that Gladstone would soon take over, saying "Gladstone will soon have it all his own way; and whenever he gets my place, we shall have strange doings". In July, he gave his last formal speech regarding the services provided by members of private businesses. Palmerston travelled to his constituency of Tiverton, where he engaged in a "one more brush" with the Chartist butcher Mr. Rowcliffe. Concerns over a weak voice quickly disintegrated following his performance.

== Death ==
Palmerston enjoyed robust health in old age, living at Romsey in his home Broadlands. On 12 October 1865, he caught a chill. Instead of retiring immediately to bed, Palmerston spent an hour and a half dawdling. He then had a violent fever but his condition stabilised for the next few days. However, on the night of 17 October, his health worsened, and when his doctor asked him if he believed in regeneration of the world through Jesus Christ, Palmerston replied: "Oh, surely." His last words were, "That's Article 98; now go on to the next." (He was thinking about diplomatic treaties.) An apocryphal version of his last words is: "Die, my dear doctor? That is the last thing I shall do." He died at 10:45 am on Wednesday, 18 October 1865, two days before his eighty-first birthday. Although Palmerston wanted to be buried at Romsey Abbey, the Cabinet insisted that he should have a state funeral and be buried at Westminster Abbey, which he was, on 27 October 1865. He was the fifth person not of royalty to be granted a state funeral (after Robert Blake, Sir Isaac Newton, Lord Nelson, and the Duke of Wellington).

Queen Victoria wrote after his death that though she regretted his passing, she had never liked or respected him: "Strange, and solemn to think of that strong, determined man, with so much worldly ambition – gone! He had often worried and distressed us, though as Pr. Minister he had behaved very well." Florence Nightingale reacted differently upon hearing of his death: "He will be a great loss to us. Tho' he made a joke when asked to do the right thing, he always did it. No one else will be able to carry things thro' the Cabinet as he did. I shall lose a powerful protector...He was so much more in earnest than he appeared. He did not do himself justice."

Having no male heir, his Irish viscountcy became extinct upon his death, but his property was inherited by his stepson William Cowper-Temple (later created the 1st Baron Mount Temple), whose inheritance included a 10,000-acre (4,000-hectare) estate in the north of County Sligo in the west of Ireland, on which his stepfather had commissioned the building of the incomplete Classiebawn Castle.

== Legacy ==
As the exemplar of British nationalism, he was "the defining political personality of his age."

Historian Norman Gash endorses Jasper Ridley's characterisation of Palmerston:

Fundamentally he was a professional politician, shrewd, cynical, resilient; tough and sometimes unscrupulous; quick to seize opportunities; always ready either to abandon an impossible cause or bide his time for a more favourable opportunity. He liked power, he needed his salary, he enjoyed office, he worked hard. In later life he took an increasing pleasure in the game of politics, and ultimately became an adroit and successful prime minister.... in the end he became one of the great Victorian public personalities, a legend in his own lifetime, the personification of an England that was already passing away.

Historian Algernon Cecil summed up his greatness:

Palmerston placed his trust... in the Press which he was at pains to manipulate; in Parliament, which he learnt better than any man then living to manage; and the Country, whose temper he knew how to catch and the weight of his name and resources he brought to bear upon every negotiation with a patriotic effrontry that has never been excelled.

Palmerston has traditionally been viewed as "a Conservative at home and a Liberal abroad". He believed that the British constitution as secured by the Glorious Revolution of 1688 was the best which human hands had made, with a constitutional monarchy subject to the laws of the land but retaining some political power. He supported the rule of law and opposed further democratisation after the Reform Act 1832. He wished to see this liberal system of a mixed constitution in-between the two extremes of absolute monarchy and republican democracy replace the absolute monarchies on the Continent. More recently some historians have seen his domestic policies as prime minister as not merely liberal but genuinely progressive by the standards of his era.

It is in foreign affairs that Palmerston is chiefly remembered. Palmerston's principal aim in foreign policy was to advance British national interests. Palmerston is famous for his patriotism. Lord John Russell said that "his heart always beat for the honour of England". Palmerston believed it was in Britain's interests that liberal governments be established on the Continent. He also practised brinkmanship and bluff in that he was prepared to threaten war to achieve Britain's interests.

When in 1886 Lord Rosebery became foreign secretary in the Third Gladstone ministry, John Bright, a longstanding radical critic of Palmerston, asked Rosebery if he had read about Palmerston's policies as foreign secretary. Rosebery replied that he had. "Then", said Bright, "you know what to avoid. Do the exact opposite of what he did. His administration at the Foreign Office was one long crime."

In contrast the Marquess of Lorne, a son-in-law of Queen Victoria, said of Palmerston in 1866: "He loved his country and his country loved him. He lived for her honour, and she will cherish his memory."

In 1889, Gladstone recounted a story of when "a Frenchman, thinking to be highly complimentary, said to Palmerston: 'If I were not a Frenchman, I should wish to be an Englishman'; to which Pam coolly replied: 'If I were not an Englishman, I should wish to be an Englishman.'" When Winston Churchill campaigned for rearmament in the 1930s, he was compared to Palmerston in warning the nation to look to its defences. The policy of appeasement led General Jan Smuts to write in 1936 that "we are afraid of our shadows. I sometimes long for a ruffian like Palmerston or any man who would be more than a string of platitudes and apologies."

He was an avowed abolitionist whose attempts to abolish the slave trade was one of the most consistent elements of his foreign policy. His opposition to the slave trade created tensions with South American countries and the United States over his insistence that the Royal Navy had the right to search the vessels of any country if they suspected the vessels were being used in the Atlantic slave trade.

Historian A. J. P. Taylor has summarised his career by emphasising the paradoxes:

For twenty years junior minister in a Tory government, he became the most successful of Whig Foreign Secretaries; though always a Conservative, he ended his life by presiding over the transition from Whiggism to Liberalism. He was the exponent of British strength, yet was driven from office for truckling to a foreign despot; he preached the Balance of Power, yet helped to inaugurate the policy of isolation and of British withdrawal from Europe. Irresponsible and flippant, he became the first hero of the serious middle-class electorate. He reached high office solely through an irregular family connection; he retained it through skilful use of the press—the only Prime Minister to become an accomplished leader-writer.

Palmerston is also remembered for his light-hearted approach to government. He is once said to have claimed of a particularly intractable problem relating to Schleswig-Holstein, that only three people had ever understood the problem: one was Prince Albert, who was dead; the second was a German professor, who had gone insane; and the third was himself, who had forgotten it.

The Life of Lord Palmerston up to 1847 was written by Henry Bulwer, 1st Baron Dalling and Bulwer, volumes I and II (1870), volume III edited and partly written by Evelyn Ashley (1874), after the author's death. Ashley completed the biography in two more volumes (1876). The whole work was reissued in a revised and slightly abridged form by Ashley in 2 volumes in 1879, with the title The Life and Correspondence of Henry John Temple, Viscount Palmerston; the letters are judiciously curtailed, but unfortunately without indicating where the excisions occur; the appendices of the original work are omitted, but much fresh matter is added, and this edition is undoubtedly the standard biography.

The popular Victorian novelist Anthony Trollope published a biography of Palmerston, one of his political heroes, in 1882.

=== Places named after Palmerston ===
- Palmerston Lodge, Fairburn, North Yorkshire, hunting lodge built by Lord Palmerston in Fairburn, Yorkshire.

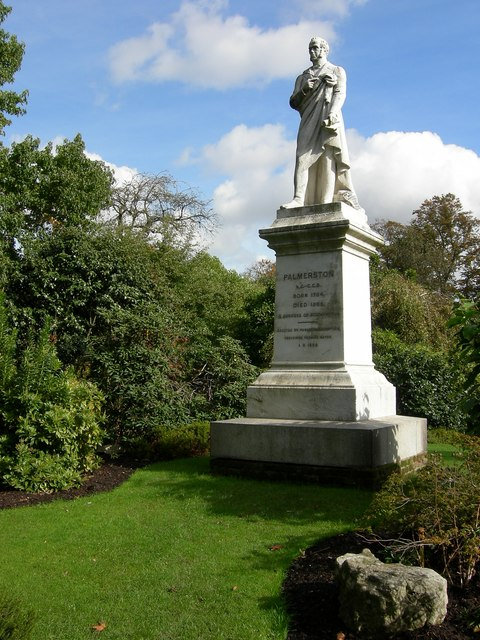
Palmerston's Memorial in Southampton

- The Town of Palmerston located in Southwestern Ontario, Canada was founded and named after Palmerston in 1875. Palmerston is now part of the amalgamated town of Minto.
- The former township of Palmerston in Frontenac County in Eastern Ontario, now part of the amalgamated township of North Frontenac
- In New Zealand, the town of Palmerston, in Otago in the South Island, and the city of Palmerston North, in Manawatu in the North Island.
- The Australian city of Darwin was previously named Palmerston in honour of the Viscount. A satellite city called Palmerston was established adjacent to Darwin in 1971.
- Palmerston Atoll is the most northerly of the Southern Group of the Cook Islands in the South Pacific Ocean. Amongst the 15 or so islands of the atoll, Palmerston Island is the only one which is inhabited.
- In the Rathmines area of Dublin 6 in the southern suburbs, villas are named after Palmerston, as well as Temple Road and Palmerston Road. Both are quasi-translated variously as Bóthar an Stiguaire, Bóthar P(h)almerston, Bóthar Baile an Phámar and Bóthar an Teampaill.
- Palmerston Forts
- Several places in Portsmouth are named after Palmerston – notably Southsea's main shopping precinct, Palmerston Road.
- Palmerston Road in East Sheen, London, SW14.
- Palmerston Place in the West End, Edinburgh, EH12.
- Palmerston Road in Walthamstow, London & The Lord Palmerston Pub at the junction of Palmerston Road and Forest Road.
- Lord Palmerston pub and Palmerston Road in Carshalton and Palmerston Grove in Merton Park, London
- The Lord Palmerston public house in Dartmouth Park, London, NW5 is named after Palmerston.
- Palmerston Park and the Palmerston Hotel in Tiverton, Devon, Palmerston's constituency, are named after him.
- Palmerston Road in Bournemouth
- Palmerston Park, Southampton was named after him, as was nearby Palmerston Road. A seven-foot high marble statue of Palmerston was erected in the park and unveiled on 2 June 1869. Temple street in Sligo is also called after him
- Palmerston Street in Derby.
- Palmerston Street in Bedford.
- Palmerston Road and Palmerston Park in east Belfast.
- Palmerston Boulevard and Palmerston Avenue in Toronto are named for him.
- Palmerston Street in Romsey, Hampshire; there is also a statue of him in the market place.
- Cape Palmerston south of San Josef Bay on Vancouver Island

== Cultural references ==
- The Cantos - In Canto LII, Ezra Pound references "Lord Palmerston / draining swamps in Sligo / Fought smoke nuisance in London. Dredged harbour in Sligo."
- Flashman in the Great Game – Early in this historical novel, Palmerston sends Flashman on a mission to India. It happens that the Indian rebellion of 1857 is about to break out.
- Five Weeks in a Balloon (1962) - In this movie, Herbert Marshall plays an unnamed Prime Minister in 1862. The character's old age and opposition to slavery are consistent with Palmerston.
- 1862 – Palmerston is featured in the alternate history novel by Robert Conroy, depicting an American Civil War in which Great Britain allies itself with the Confederacy after the Trent Affair at the direction of Palmerston.
- Stars and Stripes trilogy – Palmerston is featured in the alternate history novel by Harry Harrison, depicting an American Civil War in which Great Britain invades both the United States and the Confederacy after the Trent Affair.
- Flying Colours – in this novel by CS Forester, Horatio Hornblower meets a young Palmerston on returning to England.
- Wagons West! - Palmerston is portrayed early in the book series in opposition to American settlement of Oregon Country.
- The Simpsons - in "Homer at the Bat", Barney Gumble argues with Wade Boggs that Palmerston was the greatest prime minister, with Boggs arguing for Pitt the Elder, before the disagreement escalates into a brawl.
- Palmerston, the resident Chief Mouser of the Foreign & Commonwealth Office since 13 April 2016, was named after Palmerston.
- Laurence Fox portrays Palmerston in series 3 of Victoria (2019); the series dramatises his turbulent period as foreign secretary.

== Palmerston's First Cabinet, February 1855 – February 1858 ==
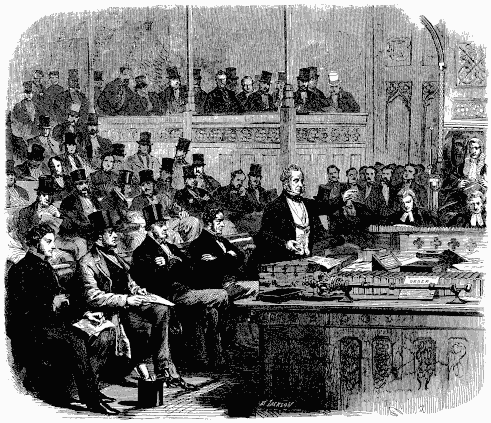
Palmerston addressing the House of Commons

- Lord Palmerston – First Lord of the Treasury and Leader of the House of Commons
- Robert Rolfe, 1st Baron Cranworth – Lord Chancellor
- Granville Leveson-Gower, 2nd Earl Granville – Lord President of the Council and Leader of the House of Lords
- George Douglas Campbell, 8th Duke of Argyll – Lord Privy Seal
- Sir George Grey, 2nd Baronet – Secretary of State for the Home Department
- George Villiers, 4th Earl of Clarendon – Secretary of State for Foreign Affairs
- Sidney Herbert – Secretary of State for the Colonies
- Lord Panmure – Secretary of State for War
- Sir James Graham, 2nd Baronet – First Lord of the Admiralty
- William Ewart Gladstone – Chancellor of the Exchequer
- Sir Charles Wood – President of the Board of Control
- Edward Stanley, 2nd Baron Stanley of Alderley – President of the Board of Trade
- Dudley Ryder, 2nd Earl of Harrowby – Chancellor of the Duchy of Lancaster
- Sir William Molesworth, 8th Baronet – First Commissioner of Works
- Charles Canning, 1st Earl Canning – Postmaster-General
- Henry Petty-FitzMaurice, 3rd Marquess of Lansdowne – Minister without Portfolio

=== Changes ===
- Later in February 1855 – Sir George Cornewall Lewis succeeds Gladstone as Chancellor of the Exchequer. Lord John Russell succeeds Herbert as Colonial Secretary. Sir Charles Wood succeeds Sir James Graham as First Lord of the Admiralty. R.V. Smith succeeds Wood as President of the Board of Control
- July 1855 – Sir William Molesworth succeeds Russell as Colonial Secretary. Molesworth's successor as First Commissioner of Works is not in the Cabinet.
- November 1855 – Henry Labouchere succeeds Molesworth as Colonial Secretary
- December 1855 – The Duke of Argyll succeeds Lord Canning as Postmaster-General. Lord Harrowby succeeds Argyll as Lord Privy Seal. Harrowby's successor as Chancellor of the Duchy of Lancaster is not in the Cabinet
- 1857 – Matthew Talbot Baines, the Chancellor of the Duchy of Lancaster, enters the Cabinet.
- February 1858 – Ulick de Burgh, 1st Marquess of Clanricarde succeeds Harrowby as Lord Privy Seal.

== Palmerston's Second Cabinet, June 1859 – October 1865 ==
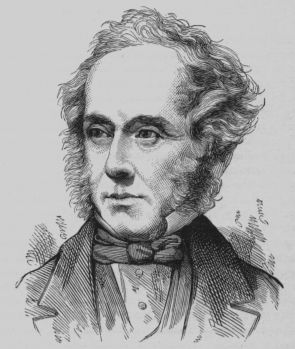
Henry Temple, 3rd Viscount Palmerston

- Lord Palmerston – First Lord of the Treasury and Leader of the House of Commons
- John Campbell, 1st Baron Campbell of St Andrews – Lord Chancellor
- Granville George Leveson-Gower, 2nd Earl Granville – Lord President of the Council and Leader of the House of Lords
- The George Douglas Campbell, 8th Duke of Argyll – Lord Privy Seal
- Sir George Cornewall Lewis – Secretary of State for the Home Department
- Lord John Russell – Secretary of State for Foreign Affairs
- Henry Pelham-Clinton, 5th Duke of Newcastle – Secretary of State for the Colonies
- Sidney Herbert – Secretary of State for War
- Sir Charles Wood – Secretary of State for India
- Edward Adolphus Seymour, 12th Duke of Somerset – First Lord of the Admiralty
- William Ewart Gladstone – Chancellor of the Exchequer
- Edward Cardwell – Chief Secretary for Ireland
- Thomas Milner Gibson – President of the Board of Trade and of the Poor Law Board
- Sir George Grey, 2nd Baronet – Chancellor of the Duchy of Lancaster
- James Bruce, 8th Earl of Elgin – Postmaster-General

=== Changes ===
- July 1859 – Charles Pelham Villiers succeeds Milner-Gibson as President of the Poor Law Board (Milner-Gibson remains at the Board of Trade)
- May 1860 – Edward Stanley, 2nd Baron Stanley of Alderley succeeds Lord Elgin as Postmaster-General
- June 1861 – Richard Bethell, 1st Baron Westbury succeeds Lord Campbell as Lord Chancellor
- July 1861 – Sir George Cornewall Lewis succeeds Herbert as Secretary for War. Sir George Grey succeeds Lewis as Home Secretary. Edward Cardwell succeeds Grey as Chancellor of the Duchy of Lancaster. Cardwell's successor as Chief Secretary for Ireland is not in the Cabinet.
- April 1863 – Lord de Grey becomes Secretary for War following Sir George Lewis's death.
- April 1864 – Edward Cardwell succeeds the Duke of Newcastle as Colonial Secretary. George Villiers, 4th Earl of Clarendon succeeds Cardwell as Chancellor of the Duchy of Lancaster.
- July 1865 – Robert Rolfe, 1st Baron Cranworth succeeds Lord Westbury as Lord Chancellor

== Arms ==
Coat of arms of Henry John Temple, 3rd Viscount Palmerston
Crest A talbot sejant Sable plain collared Or. Escutcheon Quarterly 1st & 4th Or an eagle displayed Sable (Leofric, Saxon Earl of Mercia), 2nd & 3rd Argent two bars Sable each charged with three martlets Or (Temple). Supporters Dexter a lion reguardant poean sinister a horse reguardant Argent mane tail and hoofs Or. Motto Flecti Non Frangi (To Be Bent Not Broken) Orders The Most Noble Order of the Garter (KG)

== See also ==
- History of the foreign relations of the United Kingdom
  - Foreign policy of William Ewart Gladstone
- International relations (1814–1919)
- Timeline of British diplomatic history

== Bibliography ==
=== Biographies and scholarly studies ===
- John Douglas Sutherland Campbell, Duke of Argyll (1892). Viscount Palmerston. New York: HarperCollins.
- Bell, H.C.F. Lord Palmerston (2 vol 1936) vol 1 online; also vol 2 online
- Bell, Herbert C. "Palmerston and Parliamentary Representation." Journal of Modern History 4.2 (1932): 186–213. JSTOR 1871668
- Bailey, Frank E. "The Economics of British Foreign Policy, 1825-50." Journal of Modern History 12.4 (1940): 449–484. online
- Bourne, Kenneth (1970). The foreign policy of Victorian England, 1830–1902. Clarendon Press. ISBN 978-0-19-873007-1.
- Bourne, Kenneth (1961). "The Clayton-Bulwer Treaty and the Decline of British Opposition to the Territorial Expansion of the United States, 1857–60". Journal of Modern History. 33 (3): 287–291. doi:10.1086/238848. JSTOR 1876138. S2CID 154863763.
- Brown, David. "Lord Palmerston" Historian (Winter 2002) 76:33–35; historiography
- Brown, David (2010). Palmerston. Yale UP. ISBN 978-0-300-11898-8. JSTOR j.ctt5vks3x., A major scholarly biography; 570 pages.
- Brown, David. Palmerston and the politics of foreign policy, 1846-55 (2002) online PhD dissertation
- Brown, David. "Palmerston and Anglo–French Relations, 1846–1865." Diplomacy and Statecraft 17.4 (2006): 675–692.
- Brown, David (2001). "Compelling but not Controlling?: Palmerston and the Press, 1846–1855". History. 86#201 (281): 41–61. doi:10.1111/1468-229X.00176.
- Brown, David (2001). "The Power of Public Opinion: Palmerston and the Crisis of December 1851". Parliamentary History. 20 (3): 333–358. doi:10.1111/j.1750-0206.2001.tb00381.x.
- Brown, David and Miles Taylor, eds. Palmerston Studies I and II (Southampton: Harrley Institute, 2007); pp. 203, 207; essays by scholars
- Cecil, Algernon. British Foreign Secretaries 1807-1916 (1927) pp. 131–226. online
- Chamberlain, Muriel Evelyn. British Foreign Policy in the Age of Palmerston (Longman, 1980).
- Chambers, James. Palmerston. 'The People's Darling' (John Murray, 2004). ISBN 978-0-7195-5452-0
- Eichhorn, Niels. "The Intervention Crisis of 1862: A British Diplomatic Dilemma?." American Nineteenth Century History 15.3 (2014): 287-310.
- Fenton, Laurence (2010). "Origins of Animosity: Lord Palmerston and The Times, 1830–41". Media History. 16#4: 365–378. doi:10.1080/13688804.2010.507473. S2CID 153007113.
- Fenton, Laurence (2013). Palmerston and The Times: Foreign Policy, the Press and Public Opinion in Mid-Victorian Britain. IB Tauris. description
  - Fenton, L. "Palmerston and The Times - a study of foreign policy, the press and public opinion, 1846-51" (PhD Dissertation, University College Cork (Ireland); ProQuest Dissertations & Theses, 2003. U187638), Available online.
- Friedman, Isaiah. "Lord Palmerston and the protection of Jews in Palestine 1839-1851." Jewish Social Studies (1968): 23–41. JSTOR 4466386
- Fuller, Howard J. (2014). Technology and the Mid-Victorian Royal Navy Ironclad: Royal Navy Crisis in the Age of Palmerston. Routledge. Excerpt
- Golicz, Roman. "Napoleon III, Lord Palmerston and the Entente Cordiale." History Today 50.12 (2000): 10–17.
- Guedalla, Philip (1927). Palmerston, 1784-1865. New York, London, G. P. Putnam's sons.
- Henderson, Gavin B. "The Foreign Policy of Lord Palmerston" History 22#88 (1938), pp. 335–344, JSTOR 24401363
- Hicks, Geoffrey (2007). Peace, War and party politics: the Conservatives and Europe, 1846–59. Manchester University Press.
- Hickson, G. F. "Palmerston and the Clayton-Bulwer Treaty". Cambridge Historical Journal 3#3 (1931), pp. 295–303. JSTOR 3020744
- Hoppen, K. Theodore (1998). The Mid-Victorian Generation, 1846–1886., wide-ranging scholarly survey
- Judd, Denis. Palmerston (Bloomsbury, 2015).
- Kha, Henry; Swain, Warren (20 October 2016). "The Enactment of the Matrimonial Causes Act 1857: The Campbell Commission and the Parliamentary Debates". The Journal of Legal History. 37 (3): 303–330.
- Kingston, Klari. "Gunboat Liberalism? Palmerston, Europe and 1848" History Today 47#2 (1997) 37–43.
- Krein, David Frederick. " Genesis of isolation: Palmerston, Russell and the Formation of British Foreign Policy, 1861–1864." (PhD dissertation, University of Iowa; ProQuest Dissertations & Theses, 1974. 7501215), Available online at academic libraries; 2 vol. 600pp.
- Leonard, Dick Nineteenth Century British Premieres: Pitt to Roseberry (2008) pp. 245–65.
- Macknight, Thomas. Thirty Years of Foreign Policy, a History of the Secretaryships of the Earl of Aberdeen and Viscount Palmerston (1855), Online free
- Martin, Kingsley (1963). The Triumph of Lord Palmerston: a study of public opinion in England before the Crimean War. Online
- Morse, Hosea Ballou. International Relations of the Chinese Empire: The Period of Conflict: 1834-1860. (1910) online
- Paul, Herbert. History of Modern England, 1904-6 (5 vols) vol 2 online 1855–1865
- Prest, John M. Lord John Russell (U of South Carolina Press, 1972) online
- Ridley, Jasper (1971). Lord Palmerston. New York: E. P. Dutton & Company Inc. ISBN 0525148736.
- Ritchie, James Ewing (1866–1867). The life and times of Viscount Palmerston : embracing the diplomatic and domestic history of the British Empire during the last half century. Vol. 2nd. London: London Printing and Publishing.
- Roberts, David. "Lord Palmerston at the home office." Historian 21.1 (1958): 63-81. JSTOR 24437747
- Rodkey, Frederick Stanley. "Lord Palmerston and the rejuvenation of Turkey, 1830-41." Journal of Modern History 1.4 (1929): 570-593. online
  - Rodkey, Frederick Stanley. "Lord Palmerston and the Rejuvenation of Turkey, 1830-41: Part II, 1839-41." Journal of Modern History 2.2 (1930): 193-225. JSTOR 1872311
- Sanders, Lloyd Charles (1888). Life of Viscount Palmerston. J. B. Lippincott & Co.
- Seton-Watson, R. W. Britain in Europe, 1789–1914: A survey of foreign policy (1937) pp. 241–300, 400–63. online
- Southgate, Donald (1966). 'The Most English Minister': the Policies and Politics of Palmerston. London: Macmillan. online
- Steele, E.D. Palmerston and Liberalism, 1855–1865 (1991) online
- Steele, David (May 2009) [2004]. "Temple, Henry John, third Viscount Palmerston (1784–1865)". Oxford Dictionary of National Biography. Vol. 1 (online ed.). Oxford: Oxford University Press. doi:10.1093/ref:odnb/27112. (Subscription, Wikipedia Library access or UK public library membership required.)
- Steele, David. "Three British Prime Ministers and the Survival of the Ottoman Empire, 1855–1902." Middle Eastern Studies 50.1 (2014): 43-60. Covers Palmerston, Gladstone, and Salisbury.
- Taylor, A. J. P. "Lord Palmerston" History Today (July 1951) 1#7 pp. 35–41 online
- Taylor, Antony. "Palmerston and Radicalism, 1847-1865." Journal of British Studies 33.2 (1994): 157-179. JSTOR 175909
- Temperley, Harold, and Gavin B. Henderson. "Disraeli and Palmerston in 1857, or, the Dangers of Explanations in Parliament." Cambridge Historical Journal 7.2 (1942): 115-126. JSTOR 3020795
- Vereté, Mayir. "Palmerston and the Levant Crisis, 1832." Journal of Modern History 24.2 (1952): 143-151. JSTOR 1872562
- Vyčichlo, Jiří. Palmerston and Metternich’s Austria, 1830‒1841: Clash of Ideas in the Balance of Power (Walter de Gruyter, 2025).
- Walpole, Spencer. The History of Twenty-Five Years: Volume 1 1858 to 1865 (1904) online
- Weber, Frank G. "Palmerston and Prussian Liberalism, 1848." Journal of Modern History 35.2 (1963): 125-136. JSTOR 1899235
- Webster, Charles. The Foreign Policy of Palmerston. 1830-1841 (2v. 1951) a major study; vol q11 online; also see vol 2 online
- Weigall, David. Britain and the World, 1815–1986: A Dictionary of International relations (1989)
- Ward, A.W. and G. P. Gooch, eds. The Cambridge History of British Foreign Policy, 1783–1919 (3 vol, 1921–23), Volume II: 1815–66
- Williams, Chris, ed. A Companion to 19th-Century Britain (2006). Chapters 1 to 4, pp. 15–92;
- Wolffe, John (2005). "Lord Palmerston and religion: a reappraisal". English Historical Review. 120 (488): 907–936. doi:10.1093/ehr/cei240.

=== Primary sources ===
- Bourne, Kenneth (1979). The Letters of the Third Viscount Palmerston to Laurence and Elizabeth Sulivan. 1804–1863. London: The Royal Historical Society.. online
- Bourne, Kenneth, ed/ Foreign Policy of Victorian England, 1830-1902 (1970) Long introduction, +147 primary source documents, many by Palmerston. online
- Francis, George Henry (1852). Opinions and Policy of The Right Honourable Viscount Palmerston, G.C.B., M.P., &c. as Minister, Diplomatist, and Statesman, During More Than Forty Years of Public Life. London: Colburn and Co.
- Guedalla, Philip, ed. Gladstone and Palmerston, being the Correspondence of Lord Palmerston with Mr. Gladstone 1851–1865 (Victor Gollancz, 1928), online
- Lord, Sudley ed. The Lieven Palmerston Correspondence 1828-1856 (1943) online
- Partridge, Michael ed. Lives of Victorian Political Figures Part 1: Volume I Lord Palmerston Pickering & Chatto. 2006) volume 1 reprints 19 original pamphlets on Palmerston.
- Temperley, Harold and L.M. Penson, eds. Foundations of British Foreign Policy: From Pitt (1792) to Salisbury (1902) (1938), primary sources pp. 88–304 online

=== Other sources ===
Political offices
Preceded by Granville Leveson-Gower, 1st Earl Granville	Secretary at War; 1809–1828	Succeeded by Sir Henry Hardinge
Preceded by George Hamilton-Gordon, 4th Earl of Aberdeen	Foreign Secretary; 1830–1834	Succeeded by Arthur Wellesley, 1st Duke of Wellington
Preceded by Arthur Wellesley, 1st Duke of Wellington	Foreign Secretary; 1835–1841	Succeeded by George Hamilton-Gordon, 4th Earl of Aberdeen
Preceded by George Hamilton-Gordon, 4th Earl of Aberdeen	Foreign Secretary; 1846–1851	Succeeded by Granville George Leveson-Gower, 2nd Earl Granville
Preceded by Spencer Horatio Walpole	Home Secretary; 1852–1855	Succeeded by Sir George Grey
Preceded by George Hamilton-Gordon, 4th Earl of Aberdeen	Prime Minister of the United Kingdom; 6 February 1855 – 19 February 1858	Succeeded by Edward Smith-Stanley, 14th Earl of Derby
Preceded by Lord John Russell	Leader of the House of Commons; 1855–1858	Succeeded by Benjamin Disraeli
Preceded by Edward Smith-Stanley, 14th Earl of Derby	Prime Minister of the United Kingdom; 12 June 1859 – 18 October 1865	Succeeded by John Russell, 1st Earl Russell
Preceded by Benjamin Disraeli	Leader of the House of Commons; 1859–1865	Succeeded by William Ewart Gladstone
Parliament of the United Kingdom
Preceded by Isaac Corry; John Doyle	Member of Parliament for Newport, Isle of Wight; 1807–1811; With: Sir Arthur Wellesley 1807–1809; Sir Leonard Worsley-Holmes 1809–1811	Succeeded by Sir Leonard Worsley-Holmes; Cecil Bisshopp
Preceded by Earl of Euston; Sir Vicary Gibbs	Member of Parliament for Cambridge University; 1811–1831; With: Sir Vicary Gibbs 1811–1812; John Henry Smyth 1812–1822; William John Bankes 1822–1826; Sir John Copley 1826–1827; Sir Nicholas Conyngham Tindal 1827–1829; William Cavendish 1829–1831	Succeeded by Henry Goulburn; William Yates Peel
Preceded by Charles Tennyson; John Ponsonby	Member of Parliament for Bletchingley; 1831–1832; Served alongside: Thomas Hyde Villiers	Constituency abolished
New constituency	Member of Parliament for Hampshire South; 1832–1835; Served alongside: Sir George Staunton	Succeeded by John Willis Fleming; Henry Combe Compton
Preceded by John Heathcoat; James Kennedy	Member of Parliament for Tiverton; 1835–1865; With: John Heathcoat 1835–1859; George Denman 1859–1865	Succeeded by Sir John Walrond; George Denman
Party political offices
Preceded by Lord John Russell	Leaders of the British Whig Party; 1855–1859	Party merged with Peelites, Radicals and Independent Irish Party to form British Liberal party
Preceded by Lord John Russell	Whig Leader in the Commons; 1855–1859	Party merged with Peelites, Radicals and Independent Irish Party to form British Liberal party
New political party	Leader of the British Liberal Party; 1859–1865	Succeeded by John Russell, 1st Earl Russell
New political party	Liberal Leader in the Commons; 1859–1865	Succeeded by William Ewart Gladstone
Academic offices
Preceded by James Bruce, 8th Earl of Elgin	Rector of the University of Glasgow; 1862–1865	Succeeded by John Inglis, Lord Glencorse
Honorary titles
Preceded by James Andrew Broun-Ramsay, 1st Marquess of Dalhousie	Lord Warden of the Cinque Ports; 1861–1865	Succeeded by Granville George Leveson-Gower, 2nd Earl Granville
Preceded by Henry Petty-Fitzmaurice, 3rd Marquess of Lansdowne	Senior Privy Counsellor; 1863–1865	Succeeded by Robert Jocelyn, 3rd Earl of Roden
Peerage of Ireland
Preceded by Henry Temple, 2nd Viscount Palmerston	Viscount Palmerston; 1802–1865	Extinct
