= Lloyd Charles Sanders =

English author

- Born: 1857
- Died: 27 December 1927 (aged 69–70)
- Occupations: Writer, biographer
- Father: Reverend Lloyd Sanders

Lloyd Charles Sanders (1857 – 27 December 1927) was an English writer and biographer, known for a special knowledge of the 18th and 19th centuries, who wrote a number of volumes as well as contributing a number of entries to the Dictionary of National Biography.

== Biography ==
Sanders was born as the eldest son of the Reverend Lloyd Sanders, rector of Whimple, Devon, Sanders was educated as an exhibitioner of Christ Church, Oxford, taking a second class in moderations and a first in modern history, and the Standhope historical essay prize in 1880.

Sanders was a member of the Athenaeum Club in London.

== Bibliography ==
- Celebrities of the century: being a dictionary of men and women of the nineteenth century (edited; 1888)
- Life of Viscount Palmerston (1888) - on Lord Palmerston
- Life of Richard Brinsley Sheridan (1890) - on Richard Brinsley Sheridan
- Lord Melbourne's Papers (edited; 1890) - the papers of William Lamb, 2nd Viscount Melbourne
- History of England During the Reign of Victoria, 1837-1901 (with Sir Sidney Low; 1908)
- The Holland House Circle (1908) - on the Whig social set of Holland House
- Old Kew, Chiswick, and Kensington (1910)
- Patron and Place-Hunter, a Study of George Bubb Dodington, Lord Melcombe (1919) - on George Dodington, 1st Baron Melcombe
