= Scottish representatives to the first Parliament of Great Britain =

The Scottish representatives to the first Parliament of Great Britain, serving from 1 May 1707 to 26 May 1708, were not elected like their colleagues from England and Wales, but rather hand-picked.

The forty five men sent to London in 1707, to the House of Commons of the 1st Parliament of Great Britain, were co-opted from the Commissioners of the newly adjourned Parliament of Scotland (see List of constituencies in the Parliament of Scotland at the time of the Union).

== Legal background to the composition of the 1st Parliament ==
Under the Treaty of Union of the Two Kingdoms of England and Scotland it was provided:

"III. THAT the United Kingdom of Great Britain be Represented by one and the same Parliament to be stiled the Parliament of Great Britain.

...

XXII. THAT ... A Writ do issue ... Directed to the Privy Council of Scotland, Commanding them to Cause ... forty five Members to be elected to sit in the House of Commons of the Parliament of Great Britain ... in such manner as by a subsequent Act of the present session of the Parliament of Scotland shall be settled ... And that ... the members of the House of Commons of the said Parliament of England and the forty five Members for Scotland ... shall be ... the first Parliament of Great Britain ..."

The Parliament of Scotland duly passed an Act settling the manner of electing the sixteen peers and forty five commoners to represent Scotland in the initial Parliament of Great Britain. A special provision for the 1st Parliament of Great Britain was "that the Sixteen Peers and Forty five Commissioners for Shires and Burghs shall be chosen by the Peers, Barrons and Burghs respectively in this present session of Parliament and out of the members thereof in the same manner that Committees of Parliament are usually now chosen shall be the members of the respective Houses of the said first Parliament of Great Britain for and on the part of Scotland ..."

The Kingdom of Great Britain came into existence on 1 May 1707.

== Dates of the Parliament ==
Election: The members of the last House of Commons of England had been elected between 7 May 1705 and 6 June 1705. The last general election in pre-Union Scotland was in 1703.

First meeting and maximum legal term: Parliament first met on 23 October 1707. The Parliament was due to expire, if not sooner dissolved, at the end of the term of three years from the first meeting of the last Parliament of England, which would have been on 14 June 1708.

Dissolution: The 1st Parliament of Great Britain was dissolved on 3 April 1708.

== Selection of members from Scotland ==
Scotland was entitled to 45 members in the new House of Commons. The Scottish legislation prescribed the constituencies from which the members of the Commons from Scotland were in future to be elected. These constituencies were first used in the election of 1708 to the 2nd Parliament.

Of the 45 members returned to the Parliament of Great Britain, 30 were Shire Commissioners and 15 were Burgh Commissioners.

== Members of Parliament returned for Scotland (1707–1708) ==
Name	Birth	Death	Former constituency	Party
Alexander Abercromby	1678	1729	Banffshire	Court
The Hon. Sir David Dalrymple, 1st Bt	c. 1665	1721	Culross	Court
The Hon. William Dalrymple	1678	1744	Ayrshire	Court
Sir William Kerr, 3rd Bt		1716	Roxburghshire	Squadrone
The Hon. Sir Kenneth Mackenzie, 3rd Bt	c. 1658	1728	Cromartyshire	Court
Hugh Rose	1663	1732	Nairnshire	Court
James Scott	1671	1732	Montrose	Court
The Hon. Alexander Maitland		1721	Inverbervie	Court
William Seton of Pitmedden, 2nd Bt	1673	1744	Aberdeenshire	Court (Squadrone?)
Sir George Allardice of Allardice	1672	1709	Kintore	Court
Sir Alexander Douglas		1718	Orkney and Shetland	Court
Patrick Moncreiff	c. 1674	1709	Kinghorn	Court
Sir James Smollett	c. 1648	1731	Dumbarton	Court
George Baillie	1664	1738	Lanarkshire	Squadrone
Archibald Douglas	c. 1667	1741	Roxburghshire	Court
The Hon. Francis Montgomerie		by 1729	Ayrshire	Court
The Hon. John Stewart	after 1670	1748	Wigtownshire	Court
Sir William Bennet, 2nd Bt		1729	Roxburghshire	Court
Mungo Graham	1670	1754	Perthshire	Squadrone
Sir Hugh Montgomerie, 6th Bt	c. 1663	1735	Glasgow	Court (Anti-Union)
Sir John Swinton	before 1662	1723	Berwickshire	Court
John Bruce		1711	Kinross-shire	Squadrone
Alexander Grant	after 1673	1719	Inverness-shire	Court
William Morison	1663	1739	Peeblesshire	Court
Sir Thomas Burnett, 3rd Bt	after 1656	1714	Kincardineshire	Court
Sir John Haldane, 11th Laird of Gleneagles	1660	1721	Perthshire	Squadrone
John Murray	c. 1667	1714	Selkirkshire	Court
Daniel Campbell	c. 1672	1753	Inveraray	Court
Sir Peter Halkett, 1st Bt	c. 1660	1746	Dunfermline	Squadrone
William Nisbet	c. 1666	1724	Haddingtonshire	Squadrone
Sir James Campbell, 5th Bt	c. 1679	1756	Argyllshire	Court
James Halyburton		by 1755	Forfarshire	Squadrone
The Hon. Patrick Ogilvy	1665	1737	Cullen	Court
James Campbell	c. 1666	1752	Argyllshire	Court
The Hon. Sir Andrew Hume (Lord Kimmerghame)	1676	1730	Kirkcudbright	Squadrone
Sir Robert Pollock, 1st Bt	c. 1665	1735	Renfrewshire	Court
The Hon. John Campbell	c. 1660	1729	Argyllshire	Court
Sir John Johnstone, 1st Bt		1711	Dumfriesshire	Court
John Pringle	c. 1674	1754	Selkirkshire	Court
John Clerk	1676	1755	Whithorn	Court
Sir Patrick Johnston		1736	Edinburgh	Court
Sir David Ramsay, 4th Bt	after 1673	1710	Kincardineshire	Independent (Anti-Union)
John Cockburn	c. 1679	1758	Haddingtonshire	Squadrone
Sir John Erskine, 3rd Bt	1672	1739	Burntisland	Squadrone
John Erskine	1660	1733	Stirling	Court

== See also ==
- Lists of MPs for constituencies in Scotland
