= List of multi-member constituencies in the United Kingdom and predecessor Parliaments =

This article contains a List of multi-member constituencies in the United Kingdom and predecessor Parliaments. It is sub-divided into England, Wales, Scotland and Ireland (including Northern Ireland from 1922).

This list excludes periods when a constituency only returned one member. The from date is the year from which the multi-member constituency is known to have been regularly represented. The until date is the year when the constituency was either disenfranchised or ceased to have more than one member. It covers the Parliament of England, the Protectorate Parliament, the Parliament of Scotland, the Parliament of Ireland, the Parliament of Great Britain and the Parliament of the United Kingdom.

In some cases there were earlier periods of enfranchisement in the Parliament of England but those before the sixteenth century are excluded from this list. In the English and Welsh sub-lists the 'Prot' column only covers the first two Protectorate Parliaments (1654–1658). The English and Welsh seats in the third Protectorate Parliament (1659) used the same seats as the '<1826' column. The 'Prot' column includes all three Protectorate Parliaments for the Scottish and Irish sub-lists.

At present only the number of seats by constituency for the last Parliament of Scotland before the Union have been identified. The multi-member constituencies in that Parliament may well be much older.

== Multi-member constituencies in England ==
Article names are followed by (UK Parliament constituency). The constituencies which existed before 1832 were all part of the Parliament of England (from the date indicated until 1707), the Parliament of Great Britain (1707–1800) and the Parliament of the United Kingdom (from 1801).

Due to the lack of survival of records, it is not certain when in the thirteenth century most of the counties and the older boroughs were enfranchised. All the historic counties, except Cheshire and Durham, are deemed to have been enfranchised in 1290 for the purposes of this list. The oldest parliamentary boroughs are deemed to have been enfranchised in 1295, when a contemporary official list is available. However, as the 1295 list does not include London it may not be complete.

Many counties and boroughs may have been represented at Simon de Montfort's Parliament of 1265 or other early Parliaments for which no exact records are available. The earliest known Parliament to which knights of the shire (representing counties) were summoned was in 1258 and the earliest known attendance of burgesses (representing boroughs) was at the 1265 meeting, but it is not known which counties and boroughs were involved.

=== A ===
Constituency	From	Until	Prot	<1832	1832	1868	1885	1918	Historic County
Aldborough	1558	1832	-	2	-	-	-	-	Yorkshire
Aldeburgh	1571	1832	-	2	-	-	-	-	Suffolk
Amersham	1625	1832	-	2	-	-	-	-	Buckinghamshire
Andover	1586	1868	-	2	2	-	-	-	Hampshire
Appleby	1295	1832	-	2	-	-	-	-	Westmorland
Arundel	1295	1832	-	2	-	-	-	-	Sussex
Ashburton	1640	1832	-	2	-	-	-	-	Devon
Aylesbury	1553	1885	-	2	2	2	-	-	Buckinghamshire

=== B ===
Constituency	From	Until	Prot	<1832	1832	1868	1885	1918	Historic County
Barnstaple	1295	1885	-	2	2	2	-	-	Devon
Bath	1295	1918	-	2	2	2	2	-	Somerset
Bedford	1295	1885	-	2	2	2	-	-	Bedfordshire
Bedfordshire	1290	1885	5	2	2	2	-	-	Bedfordshire
Bere Alston	1584	1832	-	2	-	-	-	-	Devon
Berkshire	1290	1885	5	2	3	3	-	-	Berkshire
Berwick-upon-Tweed	1512	1885	-	2	2	2	-	-	Northumberland
Beverley	1558	1868	-	2	2	2	-	-	Yorkshire
Birmingham	1832	1885	-	-	2	3	-	-	Warwickshire
Bishop's Castle	1584	1832	-	2	-	-	-	-	Shropshire
Blackburn	1832	1950	-	-	2	2	2	2	Lancashire
Bletchingley	1295	1832	-	2	-	-	-	-	Surrey
Bodmin	1295	1868	-	2	2	-	-	-	Cornwall
Bolton	1832	1950	-	-	2	2	2	2	Lancashire
Boroughbridge	1553	1832	-	2	-	-	-	-	Yorkshire
Bossiney	1547	1832	-	2	-	-	-	-	Cornwall
Boston	1547	1885	-	2	2	2	-	-	Lincolnshire
Brackley	1547	1832	-	2	-	-	-	-	Northamptonshire
Bradford	1832	1885	-	-	2	2	-	-	Yorkshire
Bramber	1467	1832	-	2	-	-	-	-	Sussex
Bridgnorth	1295	1868	-	2	2	-	-	-	Shropshire
Bridgwater	1295	1870	-	2	2	2	-	-	Somerset
Bridport	1295	1868	-	2	2	-	-	-	Dorset
Brighton	1832	1950	-	-	2	2	2	2	Sussex
Bristol	1295	1885	2	2	2	2	-	-	Gloucestershire and Somerset
Buckingham	1542	1868	-	2	2	-	-	-	Buckinghamshire
Buckinghamshire	1290	1885	5	2	3	3	-	-	Buckinghamshire
Bury St Edmunds	1621	1885	2	2	2	2	-	-	Suffolk

=== C ===
Constituency	From	Until	Prot	<1832	1832	1868	1885	1918	Historic County
Callington	1584	1832	-	2	-	-	-	-	Cornwall
Calne	1295	1832	-	2	-	-	-	-	Wiltshire
Cambridge	1295	1885	-	2	2	2	-	-	Cambridgeshire
Cambridgeshire	1290	1885	4	2	3	3	-	-	Cambridgeshire
Cambridge University	1603	1950	-	2	2	2	2	2	Cambridgeshire
Camelford	1547	1832	-	2	-	-	-	-	Cornwall
Canterbury	1295	1885	2	2	2	2	-	-	Kent
Carlisle	1295	1885	-	2	2	2	-	-	Cumberland
Castle Rising	1558	1832	-	2	-	-	-	-	Norfolk
Chelsea	1868	1885	-	-	-	2	-	-	Middlesex
Cheshire	1545	1832	4	2	-	-	-	-	Cheshire
East Cheshire	1868	1885	-	-	-	2	-	-	Cheshire
Mid Cheshire	1868	1885	-	-	-	2	-	-	Cheshire
North Cheshire	1832	1868	-	-	2	-	-	-	Cheshire
South Cheshire	1832	1868	-	-	2	-	-	-	Cheshire
West Cheshire	1868	1885	-	-	-	2	-	-	Cheshire
City of Chester	1545	1885	-	2	2	2	-	-	Cheshire
Chichester	1295	1868	-	2	2	-	-	-	Sussex
Chippenham	1295	1868	-	2	2	-	-	-	Wiltshire
Christchurch	1561	1832	-	2	-	-	-	-	Hampshire
Cirencester	1571	1868	-	2	2	-	-	-	Gloucestershire
Clitheroe	1559	1832	-	2	-	-	-	-	Lancashire
Cockermouth	1640	1868	-	2	2	-	-	-	Cumberland
Colchester	1295	1885	2	2	2	2	-	-	Essex
Combined English Universities	1918	1950	-	-	-	-	-	2	Various counties
Corfe Castle	1572	1832	-	2	-	-	-	-	Dorset
Cornwall	1290	1832	8	2	-	-	-	-	Cornwall
East Cornwall	1832	1885	-	-	2	2	-	-	Cornwall
West Cornwall	1832	1885	-	-	2	2	-	-	Cornwall
Coventry	1298	1885	2	2	2	2	-	-	Warwickshire
Cricklade	1295	1885	-	2	2	2	-	-	Wiltshire
Cumberland	1290	1832	2	2	-	-	-	-	Cumberland
East Cumberland	1832	1885	-	-	2	2	-	-	Cumberland
West Cumberland	1832	1885	-	-	2	2	-	-	Cumberland

=== D ===
Constituency	From	Until	Prot	<1832	1832	1868	1885	1918	Historic County
Dartmouth	1351	1832	-	2	-	-	-	-	Devon
Derby	1295	1950	-	2	2	2	2	2	Derbyshire
Derbyshire	1290	1832	4	2	-	-	-	-	Derbyshire
East Derbyshire	1868	1885	-	-	-	2	-	-	Derbyshire
North Derbyshire	1832	1885	-	-	2	2	-	-	Derbyshire
South Derbyshire	1832	1885	-	-	2	2	-	-	Derbyshire
West Derbyshire	1868	1885	-	-	-	2	-	-	Derbyshire
Devizes	1331	1868	-	2	2	-	-	-	Wiltshire
Devon	1290	1832	11	2	-	-	-	-	Devon
East Devon	1868	1885	-	-	-	2	-	-	Devon
North Devon	1832	1885	-	-	2	2	-	-	Devon
South Devon	1832	1885	-	-	2	2	-	-	Devon
Devonport	1832	1918	-	-	2	2	2	-	Devon
Dorchester	1295	1868	-	2	2	-	-	-	Dorset
Dorset	1290	1885	6	2	3	3	-	-	Dorset
Dover	1369	1885	-	2	2	2	-	-	Kent
Downton	1467	1832	-	2	-	-	-	-	Wiltshire
Dunwich	1298	1832	-	2	-	-	-	-	Suffolk
City of Durham	1678	1885	-	2	2	2	-	-	Durham
County Durham	1675 ^{a}	1832	2	2	-	-	-	-	Durham
North Durham	1832	1885	-	-	2	2	-	-	Durham
South Durham	1832	1885	-	-	2	2	-	-	Durham

=== E ===
Constituency	From	Until	Prot	<1832	1832	1868	1885	1918	Historic County
East Grinstead	1307	1832	-	2	-	-	-	-	Sussex
East Looe	1571	1832	-	2	-	-	-	-	Cornwall
East Retford	1571	1885	-	2	2	2	-	-	Nottinghamshire
Isle of Ely	1654	1658	2	-	-	-	-	-	Cambridgeshire
East Essex	1868	1885	-	-	-	2	-	-	Essex
Essex	1290	1832	13	2	-	-	-	-	Essex
North Essex	1832	1868	-	-	2	-	-	-	Essex
South Essex	1832	1885	-	-	2	2	-	-	Essex
West Essex	1868	1885	-	-	-	2	-	-	Essex
Evesham	1604	1868	-	2	2	-	-	-	Worcestershire
Exeter	1295	1885	2	2	2	2	-	-	Devon
Eye	1571	1832	-	2	-	-	-	-	Suffolk

=== F ===
Constituency	From	Until	Prot	<1832	1832	1868	1885	1918	Historic County
Finsbury	1832	1885	-	-	2	2	-	-	Middlesex
Fowey	1571	1832	-	2	-	-	-	-	Cornwall

=== G ===
Constituency	From	Until	Prot	<1832	1832	1868	1885	1918	Historic County
Gatton	1450	1832	-	2	-	-	-	-	Surrey
Gloucester	1295	1885	2	2	2	2	-	-	Gloucestershire
East Gloucestershire	1832	1885	-	-	2	2	-	-	Gloucestershire
Gloucestershire	1290	1832	5	2	-	-	-	-	Gloucestershire
West Gloucestershire	1832	1885	-	-	2	2	-	-	Gloucestershire
Grampound	1547	1821	-	2	-	-	-	-	Cornwall
Grantham	1468	1885	-	2	2	2	-	-	Lincolnshire
Great Bedwyn	1295	1832	-	2	-	-	-	-	Wiltshire
Great Grimsby	1295	1832	-	2	-	-	-	-	Lincolnshire
Great Marlow	1625	1868	-	2	2	-	-	-	Buckinghamshire
Great Yarmouth	1298	1868	2	2	2	-	-	-	Mostly Norfolk but part in Suffolk
Greenwich	1832	1885	-	-	2	2	-	-	Kent
Guildford	1295	1868	-	-	2	-	-	-	Surrey

=== H ===
Constituency	From	Until	Prot	<1832	1832	1868	1885	1918	Historic County
Hackney	1868	1885	-	-	-	2	-	-	Middlesex
Halifax	1832	1918	-	-	2	2	2	-	Yorkshire
Hampshire	1290	1832	8	2	-	-	-	-	Hampshire
North Hampshire	1832	1885	-	-	2	2	-	-	Hampshire
South Hampshire	1832	1885	-	-	2	2	-	-	Hampshire
Harwich	1604	1868	-	2	2	-	-	-	Essex
Haslemere	1584	1832	-	2	-	-	-	-	Surrey
Hastings	1366	1885	-	2	2	2	-	-	Sussex
Hedon	1547	1832	-	2	-	-	-	-	Yorkshire
Helston	1298	1832	-	2	-	-	-	-	Cornwall
Hereford	1295	1885	-	2	2	2	-	-	Herefordshire
Herefordshire	1290	1885	4	2	3	3	-	-	Herefordshire
Hertford	1624	1868	-	2	2	-	-	-	Hertfordshire
Hertfordshire	1290	1885	5	2	3	3	-	-	Hertfordshire
Heytesbury	1449	1832	-	2	-	-	-	-	Wiltshire
Hindon	1449	1832	-	2	-	-	-	-	Wiltshire
Honiton	1640	1868	-	2	2	-	-	-	Devon
Horsham	1295	1832	-	2	-	-	-	-	Sussex
Huntingdon	1295	1868	-	2	2	-	-	-	Huntingdonshire
Huntingdonshire	1290	1885	3	2	2	2	-	-	Huntingdonshire
Hythe	1366	1832	-	2	-	-	-	-	Kent

=== I ===
Constituency	From	Until	Prot	<1832	1832	1868	1885	1918	Historic County
Ilchester	1621	1832	-	2	-	-	-	-	Somerset
Ipswich	1298	1918	2	2	2	2	2	-	Suffolk

=== K ===
Constituency	From	Until	Prot	<1832	1832	1868	1885	1918	Historic County
East Kent	1832	1885	-	-	2	2	-	-	Kent
Kent	1290	1832	11	2	-	-	-	-	Kent
Mid Kent	1868	1885	-	-	-	2	-	-	Kent
West Kent	1832	1885	-	-	2	2	-	-	Kent
King's Lynn	1298	1885	2	2	2	2	-	-	Norfolk
Kingston upon Hull	1334	1885	-	2	2	2	-	-	Yorkshire
Knaresborough	1553	1868	-	2	2	-	-	-	Yorkshire

=== L ===
Constituency	From	Until	Prot	<1832	1832	1868	1885	1918	Historic County
Lambeth	1832	1885	-	-	2	2	-	-	Surrey
Lancashire	1290	1832	4	2	-	-	-	-	Lancashire
North Lancashire	1832	1885	-	-	2	2	-	-	Lancashire
North East Lancashire	1868	1885	-	-	-	2	-	-	Lancashire
South Lancashire	1832	1868	-	-	2+ ^{c}	-	-	-	Lancashire
South East Lancashire	1868	1885	-	-	-	2	-	-	Lancashire
South West Lancashire	1868	1885	-	-	-	2	-	-	Lancashire
Lancaster	1523	1868	-	2	2	-	-	-	Lancashire
Launceston	1295	1832	-	2	-	-	-	-	Cornwall
Leeds	1832	1885	-	-	2	3	-	-	Yorkshire
Leicester	1295	1918	2	2	2	2	2	-	Leicestershire
Leicestershire	1290	1832	4	2	-	-	-	-	Leicestershire
North Leicestershire	1832	1885	-	-	2	2	-	-	Leicestershire
South Leicestershire	1832	1885	-	-	2	2	-	-	Leicestershire
Leominster	1295	1868	-	2	2	-	-	-	Herefordshire
Lewes	1295	1868	-	2	2	-	-	-	Sussex
Lichfield	1547	1868	-	2	2	-	-	-	Staffordshire
Lincoln	1295	1885	2	2	2	2	-	-	Lincolnshire
Lincolnshire	1290	1832	10	2	-	-	-	-	Lincolnshire
Mid Lincolnshire	1868	1885	-	-	-	2	-	-	Lincolnshire
North Lincolnshire	1832	1885	-	-	2	2	-	-	Lincolnshire
South Lincolnshire	1832	1885	-	-	2	2	-	-	Lincolnshire
Liskeard	1295	1832	-	2	-	-	-	-	Cornwall
Liverpool	1545	1885	-	2	2	3	-	-	Lancashire
City of London	1298	1950	6	4	4	4	2	2	Middlesex
Lostwithiel	1305	1832	-	2	-	-	-	-	Cornwall
Ludlow	1472	1868	-	2	2	-	-	-	Shropshire
Ludgershall	1295	1832	-	2	-	-	-	-	Wiltshire
Lyme Regis	1295	1832	-	2	-	-	-	-	Dorset
Lymington	1584	1868	-	2	2	-	-	-	Hampshire

=== M ===
Constituency	From	Until	Prot	<1832	1832	1868	1885	1918	Historic County
Macclesfield	1832	1885	-	-	2	2	-	-	Cheshire
Maidstone	1563	1885	-	2	2	2	-	-	Kent
Maldon	1332	1868	-	2	2	-	-	-	Essex
Malmesbury	1295	1832	-	2	-	-	-	-	Wiltshire
Malton	1641	1868	-	2	2	-	-	-	Yorkshire
Manchester	1832	1885	-	-	2	3	-	-	Lancashire
Marlborough	1295	1868	-	2	2	-	-	-	Wiltshire
Marylebone	1832	1885	-	-	2	2	-	-	Middlesex
Middlesex	1290	1885	4	2	2	2	-	-	Middlesex
Midhurst	1311	1832	-	2	-	-	-	-	Sussex
Milborne Port	1628	1832	-	2	-	-	-	-	Somerset
Minehead	1563	1832	-	2	-	-	-	-	Somerset
Mitchell	1547	1832	-	2	-	-	-	-	Cornwall
Morpeth	1553	1832	-	2	-	-	-	-	Northumberland

=== N ===
Constituency	From	Until	Prot	<1832	1832	1868	1885	1918	Historic County
Newark	1673	1885	-	2	2	2	-	-	Nottinghamshire
Newcastle-under-Lyme	1354	1885	-	2	2	2	-	-	Staffordshire
Newcastle-upon-Tyne	1295	1918	-	2	2	2	2	-	Northumberland
Newport (Cornwall)	1529	1832	-	2	-	-	-	-	Cornwall
Newport (Isle of Wight)	1584	1868	-	2	2	-	-	-	Hampshire (Isle of Wight)
New Romney	1371	1832	-	2	-	-	-	-	Kent
New Shoreham	1295	1885	-	2	2	2	-	-	Sussex
Newton (Lancashire)	1559	1832	-	2	-	-	-	-	Lancashire
Newtown (Isle of Wight)	1584	1832	-	2	-	-	-	-	Hampshire (Isle of Wight)
New Woodstock	1571	1832	-	2	-	-	-	-	Oxfordshire
East Norfolk	1832	1868	-	-	2	-	-	-	Norfolk
Norfolk	1290	1832	10	2	-	-	-	-	Norfolk
North Norfolk	1868	1885	-	-	-	2	-	-	Norfolk
South Norfolk	1868	1885	-	-	-	2	-	-	Norfolk
West Norfolk	1832	1885	-	-	2	2	-	-	Norfolk
Northallerton	1640	1832	-	2	-	-	-	-	Yorkshire
Northampton	1295	1918	-	2	2	2	2	-	Northamptonshire
Northamptonshire	1290	1832	6	2	-	-	-	-	Northamptonshire
North Northamptonshire	1832	1885	-	-	2	2	-	-	Northamptonshire
South Northamptonshire	1832	1885	-	-	2	2	-	-	Northamptonshire
North Northumberland	1832	1885	-	-	2	2	-	-	Northumberland
Northumberland	1290	1832	3	2	-	-	-	-	Northumberland
South Northumberland	1832	1885	-	-	2	2	-	-	Northumberland
Norwich	1298	1950	2	2	2	2	2	2	Norfolk
Nottingham	1295	1885	2	2	2	2	-	-	Nottinghamshire
North Nottinghamshire	1832	1885	-	-	2	2	-	-	Nottinghamshire
Nottinghamshire	1290	1832	4	2	-	-	-	-	Nottinghamshire
South Nottinghamshire	1832	1885	-	-	2	2	-	-	Nottinghamshire

=== O ===
Constituency	From	Until	Prot	<1832	1832	1868	1885	1918	Historic County
Okehampton	1640	1832	-	2	-	-	-	-	Devon
Oldham	1832	1950	-	-	2	2	2	2	Lancashire
Old Sarum	1360	1832	-	2	-	-	-	-	Wiltshire
Orford	1512	1832	-	2	-	-	-	-	Suffolk
Oxford	1295	1885	-	2	2	2	-	-	Oxfordshire
Oxfordshire	1290	1885	5	2	3	3	-	-	Oxfordshire
Oxford University	1603	1950	-	2	2	2	2	2	Oxfordshire

=== P ===
Constituency	From	Until	Prot	<1832	1832	1868	1885	1918	Historic County
Penryn	1553	1832	-	2	-	-	-	-	Cornwall
Penryn and Falmouth	1832	1885	-	-	2	2	-	-	Cornwall
Peterborough	1547	1885	-	2	2	2	-	-	Northamptonshire
Petersfield	1547	1832	-	2	-	-	-	-	Hampshire
Plymouth	1442	1918	2	2	2	2	2	-	Devon
Plympton Erle	1295	1832	-	2	-	-	-	-	Devon
Pontefract	1621	1885	-	2	2	2	-	-	Yorkshire
Poole	1455	1868	-	2	2	-	-	-	Dorset
Portsmouth	1295	1918	-	2	2	2	2	-	Hampshire
Preston	1529	1950	-	2	2	2	2	2	Lancashire

=== Q ===
Constituency	From	Until	Prot	<1832	1832	1868	1885	1918	Historic County
Queenborough	1571	1832	-	2	-	-	-	-	Kent

=== R ===
Constituency	From	Until	Prot	<1832	1832	1868	1885	1918	Historic County
Reading	1295	1885	-	2	2	2	-	-	Berkshire
Reigate	1295	1832	-	2	-	-	-	-	Surrey
Richmond (Yorks)	1585	1868	-	2	2	-	-	-	Yorkshire
Ripon	1553	1868	-	2	2	-	-	-	Yorkshire
Rochester	1295	1885	-	2	2	2	-	-	Kent
Rutland	1290	1885	2	2	2	2	-	-	Rutland
Rye	1366	1832	-	2	-	-	-	-	Sussex

=== S ===
Constituency	From	Until	Prot	<1832	1832	1868	1885	1918	Historic County
St Albans	1553	1852	-	2	2	-	-	-	Hertfordshire
St Germans	1563	1832	-	2	-	-	-	-	Cornwall
St Ives	1558	1832	-	2	-	-	-	-	Cornwall
St Mawes	1563	1832	-	2	-	-	-	-	Cornwall
Salford	1868	1885	-	-	-	2	-	-	Lancashire
Salisbury	1295	1885	2	2	2	2	-	-	Wiltshire
Saltash	1547	1832	-	2	-	-	-	-	Cornwall
Sandwich	1366	1885	-	2	2	2	-	-	Kent
Scarborough	1295	1885	-	2	2	2	-	-	Yorkshire
Seaford	1641	1832	-	2	-	-	-	-	Sussex
Shaftesbury	1295	1832	-	2	-	-	-	-	Dorset
Sheffield	1832	1885	-	-	2	2	-	-	Yorkshire
Shrewsbury	1295	1885	2	2	2	2	-	-	Shropshire
North Shropshire	1832	1885	-	-	2	2	-	-	Shropshire
Shropshire	1290	1832	4	2	-	-	-	-	Shropshire
South Shropshire	1832	1885	-	-	2	2	-	-	Shropshire
East Somerset	1832	1885	-	-	2	2	-	-	Somerset
Mid Somerset	1868	1885	-	-	-	2	-	-	Somerset
Somerset	1290	1832	11	2	-	-	-	-	Somerset
West Somerset	1832	1885	-	-	2	2	-	-	Somerset
Southampton	1295	1950	-	2	2	2	2	2	Hampshire
Southwark	1295	1885	2	2	2	2	-	-	Surrey
Stafford	1295	1885	-	2	2	2	-	-	Staffordshire
East Staffordshire	1868	1885	-	-	-	2	-	-	Staffordshire
North Staffordshire	1832	1885	-	-	2	2	-	-	Staffordshire
South Staffordshire	1832	1868	-	-	2	-	-	-	Staffordshire
Staffordshire	1290	1832	3	2	-	-	-	-	Staffordshire
West Staffordshire	1868	1885	-	-	-	2	-	-	Staffordshire
Stamford	1467	1868	-	2	2	-	-	-	Lincolnshire
Steyning	1467	1832	-	2	-	-	-	-	Sussex
Stockbridge	1563	1832	-	2	-	-	-	-	Hampshire
Stockport	1832	1950	-	-	2	2	2	2	Cheshire
Stoke-upon-Trent	1832	1885	-	-	2	2	-	-	Staffordshire
Stroud	1832	1885	-	-	2	2	-	-	Gloucestershire
Sudbury	1559	1844	-	2	2	-	-	-	Suffolk
East Suffolk	1832	1885	-	-	2	2	-	-	Suffolk
Suffolk	1290	1832	10	2	-	-	-	-	Suffolk
Western Division of Suffolk	1832	1885	-	-	2	2	-	-	Suffolk
Sunderland	1832	1950	-	-	2	2	2	2	Durham
East Surrey	1832	1885	-	-	2	2	-	-	Surrey
Mid Surrey	1868	1885	-	-	-	2	-	-	Surrey
Surrey	1290	1832	6	2	2	-	-	-	Surrey
West Surrey	1832	1885	-	-	2	2	-	-	Surrey
East Sussex	1832	1885	-	-	2	2	-	-	Sussex
Sussex	1290	1832	9	2	-	-	-	-	Sussex
West Sussex	1832	1885	-	-	2	2	-	-	Sussex

=== T ===
Constituency	From	Until	Prot	<1832	1832	1868	1885	1918	Historic County
Tamworth	1563	1885	-	2	2	2	-	-	Staffordshire
Taunton	1295	1885	2	2	2	2	-	-	Somerset
Tavistock	1330	1868	-	2	2	-	-	-	Devon
Tewkesbury	1610	1868	-	2	2	-	-	-	Gloucestershire
Thetford	1529	1868	-	2	2	-	-	-	Norfolk
Thirsk	1553	1832	-	2	-	-	-	-	Yorkshire
Tiverton	1615	1885	-	2	2	2	-	-	Devon
Totnes	1295	1868	-	2	2	-	-	-	Devon
Tower Hamlets	1832	1885	-	-	2	2	-	-	Middlesex
Tregony	1559	1832	-	2	-	-	-	-	Cornwall
Truro	1295	1885	-	2	2	2	-	-	Cornwall

=== W ===
Constituency	From	Until	Prot	<1832	1832	1868	1885	1918	Historic County
Wallingford	1295	1832	-	2	-	-	-	-	Berkshire
Wareham	1302	1832	-	2	-	-	-	-	Dorset
Warwick	1295	1885	-	2	2	2	-	-	Warwickshire
North Warwickshire	1832	1885	-	-	2	2	-	-	Warwickshire
South Warwickshire	1832	1885	-	-	2	2	-	-	Warwickshire
Warwickshire	1290	1832	4	2	-	-	-	-	Warwickshire
Wells	1295	1868	-	2	2	-	-	-	Somerset
Wendover	1625	1832	-	2	-	-	-	-	Buckinghamshire
Wenlock	1295	1885	-	2	2	2	-	-	Shropshire
Weobley	1628	1832	-	2	-	-	-	-	Herefordshire
Westbury	1449	1832	-	2	-	-	-	-	Wiltshire
West Looe	1547	1832	-	2	-	-	-	-	Cornwall
Westminster	1545	1885	2	2	2	2	-	-	Middlesex
Westmorland	1290	1885	2	2	2	2	-	-	Westmorland
Weymouth and Melcombe Regis	1572	1885	-	4	2	2	-	-	Dorset
Whitchurch	1584	1832	-	2	-	-	-	-	Hampshire
Wigan	1545	1885	-	2	2	2	-	-	Lancashire
Isle of Wight	1654	1658	2	-	-	-	-	-	Hampshire (Isle of Wight)
Wilton	1295	1832	-	2	-	-	-	-	Wiltshire
North Wiltshire	1832	1885	-	-	2	2	-	-	Wiltshire
South Wiltshire	1832	1885	-	-	2	2	-	-	Wiltshire
Wiltshire	1290	1832	10	2	-	-	-	-	Wiltshire
Winchelsea	1366	1832	-	2	-	-	-	-	Sussex
Winchester	1295	1885	-	2	2	2	-	-	Hampshire
Windsor	1424	1868	-	2	2	-	-	-	Berkshire
Wolverhampton	1832	1885	-	-	2	2	-	-	Staffordshire
Wootton Bassett	1447	1832	-	2	-	-	-	-	Wiltshire
Worcester	1295	1885	2	2	2	2	-	-	Worcestershire
East Worcestershire	1832	1885	-	-	2	2	-	-	Worcestershire
West Worcestershire	1832	1885	-	-	2	2	-	-	Worcestershire
Worcestershire	1290	1832	5	2	-	-	-	-	Worcestershire
Wycombe	1295	1868	-	2	2	-	-	-	Buckinghamshire

=== Y ===
Constituency	From	Until	Prot	<1832	1832	1868	1885	1918	Historic County
Yarmouth (Isle of Wight)	1584	1832	-	2	-	-	-	-	Hampshire (Isle of Wight)
York	1295	1918	2	2	2	2	2	-	Yorkshire
Eastern West Riding of Yorkshire	1868	1885	-	-	-	2	-	-	Yorkshire
East Riding of Yorkshire	1832 ^{a}	1885	4	-	2	2	-	-	Yorkshire
Northern West Riding of Yorkshire	1865	1885	-	-	(2)	2	-	-	Yorkshire
North Riding of Yorkshire	1832 ^{a}	1885	4	-	2	2	-	-	Yorkshire
Southern West Riding of Yorkshire	1865	1885	-	-	(2)	2	-	-	Yorkshire
West Riding of Yorkshire	1832 ^{a}	1865	6	-	(2)	-	-	-	Yorkshire
Yorkshire	1290	1832	-	2+ ^{b}	-	-	-	-	Yorkshire

Notes:-

- ^{a} Before the constituency was regularly enfranchised, it sent members to the First and Second Protectorate Parliaments 1654–1658.
- ^{b} In 1826 the representation of Yorkshire was increased to 4 seats.
- ^{c} In 1861 the representation of South Lancashire was increased to 3 seats.

== Multi-member constituencies in Wales ==
Article names are followed by (UK Parliament constituency). The constituencies which existed before 1832 were all part of the Parliament of England (from the date indicated until 1707), the Parliament of Great Britain (1707–1800) and the Parliament of the United Kingdom (from 1801).

For the purposes of this list Monmouthshire is treated as part of Wales throughout its existence as a Parliamentary county, although before the twentieth century it was regarded as part of England.

Constituency	From	Until	Prot	<1832	1832	1868	1885	1918	Historic County
Anglesey	1654	1658	2	-	-	-	-	-	Anglesey
Breconshire	1654	1658	2	-	-	-	-	-	Breconshire
Caernarvonshire	1654	1658	2	-	-	-	-	-	Caernarvonshire
Cardiganshire	1654	1658	2	-	-	-	-	-	Cardiganshire
Carmarthenshire	1832 ^{a}	1885	2	-	2	2	-	-	Carmarthenshire
Denbighshire	1832 ^{a}	1885	2	-	2	2	-	-	Denbighshire
Flintshire	1654	1658	2	-	-	-	-	-	Flintshire
Glamorganshire	1832 ^{a}	1885	2	-	2	2	-	-	Glamorganshire
Merthyr Tydfil	1868	1918	-	-	-	2	2	-	Glamorganshire
Monmouthshire	1542	1885	3	2	2	2	-	-	Monmouthshire
Montgomeryshire	1654	1658	2	-	-	-	-	-	Montgomeryshire
Pembrokeshire	1654	1658	2	-	-	-	-	-	Pembrokeshire
Radnorshire	1654	1658	2	-	-	-	-	-	Radnorshire

Note:-

- ^{a} Enfranchised with one seat in 1542, but given two seats in the First and Second Protectorate Parliaments (1654–1658), before being allocated two seats again in 1832.

== Multi-member constituencies in Scotland ==
Constituency names until 1707 are followed by (Parliament of Scotland constituency). Those from 1708 are followed by (UK Parliament constituency). The constituencies which existed before the Union in 1707 were all part of the Parliament of Scotland (from a currently unestablished date until 1707). Apart from the members co-opted to the 1st Parliament of Great Britain, who are treated in this list as representing Scotland as an undivided whole, there were no Scottish multi-member constituencies from 1707 until the boundary changes for the Parliament of the United Kingdom seats in 1832.

See the list of constituencies in the Parliament of Scotland at the time of the Union for more details, including a discussion of the possible inaccuracy of the constituency and shire names in the list.

Constituency	From	Until	Prot	<1690	1690	1707	1832	1868	1885	1918	Historic shire or county
Aberdeenshire	<1707	1707	-	2	4	-	-	-	-	-	Aberdeenshire
Argyllshire	<1707	1707	-	2	3	-	-	-	-	-	Argyllshire
Ayrshire	<1707	1707	-	2	4	-	-	-	-	-	Ayrshire
Banffshire	<1707	1707	-	2	2	-	-	-	-	-	Banffshire
Berwickshire	<1707	1707	-	2	4	-	-	-	-	-	Berwickshire
Buteshire	<1707	1707	-	2	2	-	-	-	-	-	Buteshire
Caithness-shire	<1707	1707	-	2	2	-	-	-	-	-	Caithness-shire
Combined Scottish Universities	1918	1950	-	-	-	-	-	-	-	3	various counties
Cromartyshire	<1707	1707	-	2	2	-	-	-	-	-	Cromartyshire
Dumfries and Annandale	<1707	1707	-	2	4	-	-	-	-	-	Dumfries & Annandale
Dunbartonshire	<1707	1707	-	2	2	-	-	-	-	-	Dunbartonshire
Dundee	1868	1950	-	-	-	-	-	2	2	2	Forfarshire/Angus
Edinburgh	1832 ^{a}	1885	2	2	2	-	2	2	-	-	Edinburghshire/Midlothian
Edinburghshire	<1707	1707	-	2	4	-	-	-	-	-	Edinburghshire
Elgin and Forresshire	<1707	1707	-	2	2	-	-	-	-	-	Elgin & Forresshire
Fifeshire	<1707	1707	-	2	4	-	-	-	-	-	Fifeshire
Forfarshire	<1707	1707	-	2	4	-	-	-	-	-	Forfarshire
Glasgow	1832	1885	-	-	-	-	2	3	-	-	Lanarkshire
Haddingtonshire	<1707	1707	-	2	4	-	-	-	-	-	Haddingtonshire
Inverness-shire	<1707	1707	-	2	2	-	-	-	-	-	Inverness-shire
Kincardineshire	<1707	1707	-	2	2	-	-	-	-	-	Kincardineshire
Kirkcudbright Stewartry	<1707	1707	-	2	3	-	-	-	-	-	Stewartry of Kirkcudbright
Lanarkshire	<1707	1707	-	2	4	-	-	-	-	-	Lanarkshire
Linlithgowshire	<1707	1707	-	2	2	-	-	-	-	-	Linlithgowshire
Nairnshire	<1707	1707	-	2	2	-	-	-	-	-	Nairnshire
Orkney and Zetland	<1707	1707	-	2	2	-	-	-	-	-	Orkney and Zetland
Peeblesshire	<1707	1707	-	2	2	-	-	-	-	-	Peeblesshire
Perthshire	<1707	1707	-	2	4	-	-	-	-	-	Perthshire
Renfrewshire	<1707	1707	-	2	3	-	-	-	-	-	Renfrewshire
Ross-shire	<1707	1707	-	2	2	-	-	-	-	-	Ross-shire
Roxburghshire	<1707	1707	-	2	4	-	-	-	-	-	Roxburghshire
Scotland ^{b}	1707	1708	-	-	-	45	-	-	-	-	undivided country
Selkirkshire	<1707	1707	-	2	2	-	-	-	-	-	Selkirkshire
Stirlingshire	<1707	1707	-	2	3	-	-	-	-	-	Stirlingshire
Wigtownshire	<1707	1707	-	2	2	-	-	-	-	-	Wigtownshire

Note:-

- ^{a} Edinburgh was allocated two seats in the Protectorate Parliaments (1654–1659). There were two commissioners from Edinburgh in the Parliament of Scotland. In 1708-1832 the city was represented by one member of the Westminster Parliament.
- ^{b} The members for Scotland, in the 1st Parliament of Great Britain, were co-opted by the last pre-Union Parliament of Scotland from amongst its elected members.

== Multi-member constituencies in Ireland ==
Every constituency in the Irish House of Commons elected two members up to its dissolution in 1800. Every County returned two members to the UK House of Commons from 1801 until 1885.

Constituency	From	Until	Prot	<1801	1801	1832	1885	1918	1922	Historic County
Antrim	1801	1950	-	-	2	2	2	2	2	Antrim
Belfast	1801	1885	-	-	-	2	2	-	-	Antrim
Carlow, Wexford, Kilkenny and Queen's	1654	1659	2	-	-	-	-	-	-	various counties
Cork City	1801	1922	-	2	2	2	2	2	-	Cork
Dublin City	1801	1922	2	2	2	2	-	-	-	Dublin
Derry, Donegal and Tyrone	1654	1659	2	-	-	-	-	-	-	various counties
Down	1801	1950	2	2	2	2	2	2	2	Down
Down, Antrim and Armagh	1654	1659	2	-	-	-	-	-	-	various counties
Dublin County and City	1654	1659	2	-	-	-	-	-	-	Dublin
Dublin University	1832	1922	-	2	-	2	2	2	-	Dublin
Fermanagh and Tyrone	1922	1950	-	-	-	-	-	-	2	Fermanagh, Tyrone
Galway Borough	1832	1885	-	-	-	2	2	-	-	Galway
Galway and Mayo	1654	1659	2	-	-	-	-	-	-	various counties
Kerry, Limerick and Clare	1654	1659	2	-	-	-	-	-	-	various counties
Kildare and Wicklow	1654	1659	2	-	-	-	-	-	-	various counties
Limerick City	1832	1885	-	-	-	2	2	-	-	Limerick
Londonderry	1801	1885	-	-	2	2	2	-	-	Derry
Meath and Louth	1654	1659	2	-	-	-	-	-	-	various counties
Sligo, Roscommon and Leitrim	1654	1659	2	-	-	-	-	-	-	various counties
Waterford and Tipperary	1654	1659	2	-	-	-	-	-	-	various counties
Waterford City	1832	1885	-	-	-	2	-	-	-	Limerick
Westmeath, Longford and King's	1654	1659	2	-	-	-	-	-	-	various counties
