= Squadrone Volante (Scotland) =

Scottish political party from 1705 to 1707

The Squadrone Volante (from the Italian, meaning Flying Squadron) or New Party was a political grouping in Scotland which emerged around 1700 as an offshoot of the opposition Country Party. Led by John Ker, 5th Earl of Roxburghe and John Hay, 2nd Marquess of Tweeddale, the party was influential in passing the Act of Union with England in 1707.

The members of the squadrone, which eventually totalled 25, were generally moderate Presbyterians who opposed both Episcopalians and the Jacobites. Although the actual grouping pre-dated 1705, it received the nickname squadrone volante in that year, as it was independent of the Court and Country parties in the Scottish Parliament.

The members of the Squadrone Volante were:

- Thomas Hamilton, 6th Earl of Haddington
- Patrick Hume, 1st Earl of Marchmont
- James Graham, 4th Marquess of Montrose
- John Hamilton-Leslie, 9th Earl of Rothes
- John Ker, 5th Earl of Roxburghe
- James Sandilands, 7th Lord Torphichen
- John Hay, 2nd Marquess of Tweeddale
- Sir William Anstruther of that Ilk, Commissioner for Fife
- George Baillie of Jerviswood, Commissioner for Lanarkshire
- Captain William Bennet of Grubbet, Commissioner for Roxburghshire
- John Bruce of Kinross, Commissioner for Kinross-shire
- Sir Thomas Burnett of Leys, 3rd Baronet, Commissioner for Kincardineshire
- Sir Alexander Campbell of Cessnock, Commissioner for Berwickshire
- John Cockburn of Ormiston, Commissioner for Haddingtonshire
- Robert Dundas of Arniston, Commissioner for Edinburghshire
- Mungo Graham of Gorthie, Commissioner for Perthshire
- John Haldane of Gleneagles, Commissioner for Perthshire
- James Halyburton of Pitcur, Commissioner for Forfarshire
- Sir William Kerr of Greenhead, 3rd Baronet, Commissioner for Roxburghshire
- William Nisbet of Dirleton, Commissioner for Haddingtonshire
- Patrick Bruce of Banzion, Commissioner for Cupar
- Sir John Erskine of Alva, 3rd Baronet, Commissioner for Burntisland
- Sir Peter Halkett of Pitfirrane, 1st Baronet, Commissioner for Dunfermline
- Sir Andrew Hume of Kimmerghame, Commissioner for Kirkcudbright
- James Spittal of Leuchat, Commissioner for Inverkeithing
