= George Baillie (MP, born 1664) =

Scottish politician

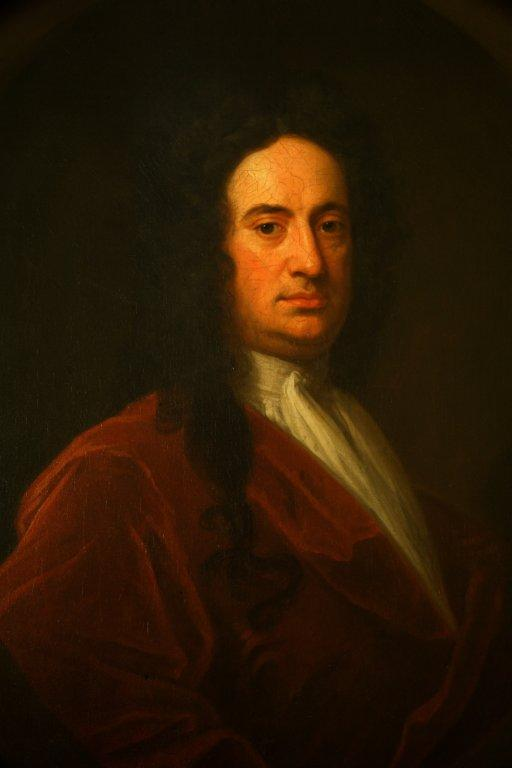
George Baillie, painted by William Aikman in 1717

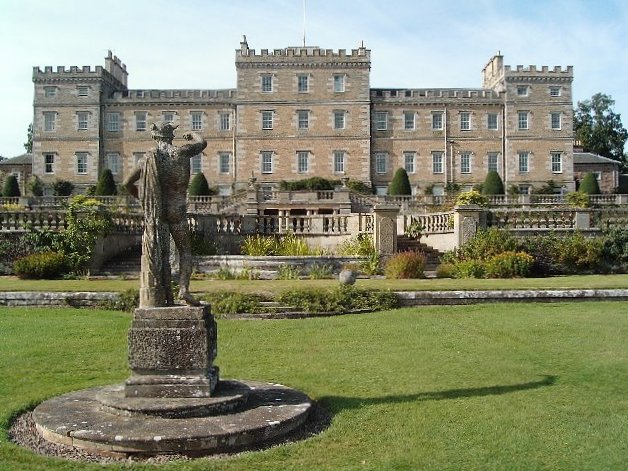
Mellerstain House

George Baillie (16 March 1664 – 6 August 1738) was a Scottish politician who sat in the Parliament of Scotland from 1691 to 1707 and in the British House of Commons from 1708 to 1734.

== Life ==
George Baillie was the son of the Scottish Covenanter Robert Baillie of Jerviswood, who was implicated in the 1683 Rye House Plot against King Charles II. When his father was imprisoned for treason in 1684, George fled Scotland for Holland with Sir Patrick Hume. In Holland he served in the horse guards of William of Orange, and returned to Britain with William in the Revolution of 1688.

Baillie was elected as Shire Commissioner of the Parliament of Scotland, representing Berwick from 1693 to 1698 and 1700 to 1701, and then Lanark from 1703 to 1707. He was one of the first subscribers to the Darien Scheme, pledging £1,000 sterling to the Company of Scotland Trading to Africa and the Indies on 26 February 1696. He was elected to the court of directors of the company on 3 April 1696. He was a leading member of the Squadrone Volante, a group of members who were influential in the debates which led to the union with England in 1707.

Additionally, Baillie played a significant role in orchestrating vast improvements in the Scottish Linen trade. In 1693, four members of the Parliament of Scotland and three Edinburgh merchants established the Scots Linen Manufactory, which was to compete with Dutch and French Linen and create a self-sufficient industry. Yet, in spite of the privileges of monopoly and of exemption from taxes, it had to give up four years later. That said, the early entrepreneurial attempts to penetrate the linen trade, facilitated the creation of the British Linen Company which became a significant moment in the industrial history of Scotland.

In October 1706, Baillie was appointed to the Scottish parliamentary committee which scrutinised the Equivalent, the compensation to be paid to Scottish beneficeries under the Union settlement, the largest group of which were the shareholders and creditors of the Company of Scotland. After the Union, he attended the Parliament of Great Britain as Member of Parliament for Berwickshire for 26 years. In 1711, he was appointed Commissioner for Trade and Plantations by Queen Anne and in 1714 King George I appointed him one of the Lords of Admiralty. In 1717 he was elevated to Lord of Treasury as a junior Lord Commissioner of the Treasury until 1725. He stepped down as an MP at the 1734 British general election, and died at Oxford in 1738. He was buried on his estate of Mellerstain in Berwickshire, where he had commenced the building of the mansion by commissioning William Adam to build the east and west wings.

== Family ==
In 1691 Baillie married Sir Patrick Hume's daughter, the songwriter and poet Lady Grizell Hume, and they had three children; Grizel (1692), who married British army officer Sir Alexander Murray of Stanhope, Robert (1694), who died in infancy and Rachel (1696), who married Charles Hamilton, Lord Binning, son of the Earl of Haddington. Rachel's elder son Thomas inherited the earldom.

Mellerstain passed to Rachel's younger son George, who completed the house by erecting a central block between the wings constructed by his grandfather. Mellerstain remains to this day the principal seat of the Earl of Haddington.

Parliament of Scotland
Preceded by Sir Archibald Cockburn; Sir Patrick Hume; Sir John Home; John Swinton	Shire Commissioner for Berwick; 1691–1702; With: Sir Archibald Cockburn; Sir John Home; Sir John Swinton	Succeeded by Sir Robert Sinclair; Sir John Home; Sir John Swinton; Sir Patrick Home
Preceded by William Baillie; Sir William Denham; James Hamilton; Sir William Stewart	Shire Commissioner for Lanark; 1702–1707; With: William Baillie; John Sinclair; James Hamilton	Succeeded by Parliament of Great Britain
Parliament of Great Britain
New constituency	Member of Parliament for Berwickshire; 1708–1734	Succeeded by Alexander Hume-Campbell
