= Mungo Graham =

Mungo Graham or Graeme (1670–1754), of Gorthy, Perthshire, was a Scottish politician who sat in the Parliament of Scotland from 1702 to 1707 and in the British House of Commons between 1707 and 1711. He was Rector of the University of Glasgow from 1718 to 1720.

Graham was baptized on 23 December 1670, the second, but eldest surviving son of Mungo Graham of Gorthy and his second wife, Mary Murray, daughter of Sir William Murray, 1st Baronet, of Ochtertyre, Perth. He succeeded his father when under a year old in 1671. He studied at the University of St. Andrews (St. Salvator's College) in 1687 and then travelled abroad. He lost money investing in the Company of Scotland.

Graham became a close supporter and assistant of the Duke of Montrose. He was appointed commissioner justiciary for the Highlands in 1702 and soon after was appointed commissioner of supply for Perthshire. Also in 1702 he was returned for the country party as Shire Commissioner for Perthshire. Following Montrose, he was involved with the opposition of 1703. In 1704, when Montrose's political friends took over responsibility for court management in the ‘New Party’ experiment, the Grahams remained in opposition. Graham joined Montrose in voting for the Duke of Hamilton's motion to postpone the settlement of the succession. When Montrose took the initiative in persuading the Squadrone to support the Union, Graham followed willingly and acted as a go-between in the discussions . He voted with the Squadrone over the Union, whereas the rest of the Grahams opposed it, and became one of the leaders of the Squadrone. In 1707 he became a commissioner of the equivalent, and was one of the Scottish representatives to the first Parliament of Great Britain in 1707.

At the 1708 British general election Graham could not find a safe seat for himself and stood unsuccessfully for Perth Burghs. In 1709 he was dropped from the commission of the Equivalent. At the 1710 British general election, he was returned in a contest as Member of Parliament for Kinross-shire. His return was engineered by Montrose's stepfather, John Bruce, hereditary sheriff of Kinross-shire, by creating fictitious votes and exploiting the sheriff's constitutional powers unscrupulously. Graham's political position was unclear and the only vote he recorded was on 27 January 1711 when with other Scottish members, he opposed an extension of the coal duty. He was unseated on petition on 10 February 1711 and did not stand at any constituency at the 1713 general election or later.

Graham was appointed receiver-general and cashier of customs and salt duties for Scotland in January 1715 and he retained the post until 1733 when Montrose was dismissed from office. In 1717 and 1718 he was Commissioner for visitation at Glasgow University. He was vice-rector of the University from January to December 1718, and Rector from December 1718 to 1720. He became burgess of Edinburgh in 1720 and was a trustee for Scottish fisheries and manufactures from 1727 for the rest of his life. He later became involved in the purchase of forfeited Jacobite estates.

Graham continued living in the household of the 2nd Duke of Montrose, and died at Buchanan Castle on 26 November 1754. He was succeeded by his kinsman, Lieutenant-Colonel David Graham of Braco, Perthshire.

Parliament of Scotland
Preceded by Sir Colin Campbell	Shire Commissioner for Perthshire; 1702–1707; With: Sir Patrick Murray	Succeeded by Parliament of Great Britain
Parliament of Great Britain
New parliament	Member of Parliament for Scotland; 1707–1708	Constituency split
New constituency	Member of Parliament for Kinross-shire; 1710–1711	Succeeded by Sir John Malcolm, 1st Baronet
