= James Halyburton (1707 MP) =

British businessman and politician

James Halyburton (or Haliburton) of Pitcur was a Scottish landowner and politician.

== Biography ==
Halyburton was the only son of David Halyburton of Pitcur and his wife Agnes Wedderburn. The Halyburtons of Pitcur were descended from a younger son of Walter Haliburton of Dirleton, Treasurer of Scotland, and members of the family had sat in the Parliament of Scotland in 1560 and in 1617. Halyburton's father David was killed fighting for the Jacobites at the Battle of Killiecrankie, and the son was only permitted to succeed to the estates in 1700.

Halyburton was elected to represent the barons of Forfarshire in the Parliament of Scotland in 1702, and was made a commissioner of justiciary for the Highlands the same year. In Parliament he supported the Squadrone and after the Act of Union 1707 he was one of the Scottish representatives to the first Parliament of Great Britain. He did not stand at the general election in 1708. He was made a burgess of Ayr in 1708.

Halyburton's first wife was Catherine, daughter of Sir John Hall, 1st Baronet of Dunglass. They were the parents of Colonel James Halyburton of Pitcur and of Agatha, who married James Douglas, 13th Earl of Morton. He was married secondly, by contract dated 8 December 1710, Mary, daughter of George Drummond of Blair Drummond; they had no children. Halyburton is said to have died in about 1743, but his son James was not served as his heir until 1755.
