= Acts of Union 1707 =

Acts of Parliament creating the Kingdom of Great Britain

Union with Scotland Act 1706 (Note: The citation of this act by this short title was authorised by section 1 of, and the first schedule to, the Short Titles Act 1896. Due to the repeal of those provisions, it is now authorised by section 19(2) of the Interpretation Act 1978.)
- Act of Parliament
- Parliament of England
- Long title: An Act for a Union of the Two Kingdoms of England and Scotland.
- Citation: 6 Ann. c. 11 (Note: This is the citation in The Statutes of the Realm.); 5 Ann. c. 8 (Note: This is the citation in The Statutes at Large.)
- Territorial extent: Kingdom of England

Dates
- Royal assent: 6 March 1707 (Note: The date would have been recorded at the time as 6 March 1706 (rather than 1707), because England (unlike Scotland) began each legal year on 25 March until the Calendar (New Style) Act 1750 changed it to 1 January. Separately, the act itself is dated 1706 because, before the Acts of Parliament (Commencement) Act 1793, the date on which a Bill became law was the first day of the parliamentary session in which it was passed, unless the act contained a provision to the contrary. According to the Gregorian Calendar, the date would have been 17 March 1707.)
- Commencement: 1 May 1707 (Note: Article I. Note: The date is according to the Julian Calendar. According to the Gregorian Calendar, it would have been 12 May 1707.)
Other legislation
Amended by	Statute Law Revision Act 1867; Promissory Oaths Act 1871; Weights and Measures Act 1878; Statute Law Revision Act 1948; Peerage Act 1963; Statute Law (Repeals) Act 1973; Statute Law (Repeals) Act 1993; Scotland Act 1998
Relates to	Exchequer Court (Scotland) Act 1707

Status: Amended

Text of statute as originally enacted

Text of the Union with Scotland Act 1706 as in force today (including any amendments) within the United Kingdom, from legislation.gov.uk.

Union with England Act 1707 (Note: The citation of this act by this short title was authorised by section 2 of, and the second schedule to, the Statute Law Revision (Scotland) Act 1964. Due to the repeal of those provisions it is now authorised by section 19(2) of the Interpretation Act 1978.)
- Act of Parliament
- Parliament of Scotland
- Long title: Act Ratifying and Approving the Treaty of Union of the Two Kingdoms of Scotland and England.
- Citation: 1707 c. 7
- Territorial extent: Kingdom of Scotland

Dates
- Royal assent: 16 January 1707
- Commencement: 1 May 1707
Other legislation
Amended by	Statute Law Revision (Scotland) Act 1906; Statute Law Revision (Scotland) Act 1964; Criminal Justice Act 1948; Peerage Act 1963; Scotland Act 1998

Status: Amended

Text of the Union with England Act 1707 as in force today (including any amendments) within the United Kingdom, from legislation.gov.uk.

The Acts of Union (Note: Scottish Gaelic: Achd an Aonaidh, Scots: Acts o Union) are two acts of Parliament, one by the Parliament of Scotland in March 1707, followed shortly thereafter by an equivalent act of the Parliament of England. They put into effect the international Treaty of Union agreed on 22 July 1706, which politically joined the Kingdom of England and Kingdom of Scotland into a single "political state" named Great Britain, with Queen Anne as its sovereign. The English and Scottish acts of ratification took effect on 1 May 1707, creating the new kingdom, with its parliament based in the Palace of Westminster.

The two countries had shared a monarch since the "personal" Union of the Crowns in 1603, when James VI of Scotland inherited the English throne from his cousin Elizabeth I to become (in addition) 'James I of England', styled James VI and I. Attempts had been made to try to unite the two separate countries, in 1606, 1667, and in 1689 (following the Glorious Revolution in 1688, and subsequent deposition of James II of England by his daughter Mary and her husband William of Orange), but it was not until the early 18th century that both nations via separate groups of English and Scots Royal Commissioners and their respective political establishments, came to support the idea of an international "Treaty of political, monetary and trade Union", albeit for different reasons.

== Political background ==
Prior to 1603, England and Scotland had different monarchs, but when Elizabeth I died without children, she was succeeded as King of England by her distant relative, James VI of Scotland. After her death, the two Crowns were held in personal union by James (reigning as James VI and I), who announced his intention to unite the two realms.

The 1603 Union of England and Scotland Act established a joint Commission to agree terms, but the Parliament of England was concerned this would lead to an absolutist structure similar to that of Scotland. James was forced to withdraw his proposals, but used the royal prerogative to take the title "King of Great Britain".

Attempts to revive the project of union in 1610 were met with hostility. English opponents such as Sir Edwin Sandys argued that changing the name of England "were as yf [sic] to make a conquest of our name, which was more than ever the Dane or Norman could do". Instead, James set about creating a unified Church of Scotland and England, as the first step towards a centralised, Unionist state.

However, despite both being nominally Episcopal in structure, the two were very different in doctrine; the Church of Scotland, or kirk, was Calvinist in doctrine, and viewed many Church of England practices as little better than Catholicism. As a result, attempts to impose religious policy by James and his son Charles I ultimately led to the 1639–1651 Wars of the Three Kingdoms. The 1639–1640 Bishops' Wars confirmed the primacy of the Scots kirk, and established a Covenanter government in Scotland. The Scots remained neutral when the First English Civil War began in 1642, before becoming concerned at the impact on Scotland of an English Royalist victory. Presbyterian leaders like Argyll viewed union as a way to ensure free trade between England and Scotland, and preserve a Scots Presbyterian kirk.

Under the 1643 Solemn League and Covenant, the Scots Parliament agreed to provide military support to its English counterpart in return for a united Presbyterian church, but did not explicitly commit to political union. As the war progressed, Scots and English Presbyterians increasingly viewed the English Independents, and associated radical groups like the Levellers, as a bigger threat than the Royalists. Both Royalists and Presbyterians agreed monarchy was divinely ordered, but disagreed on the nature and extent of Royal authority over the church. When Charles I surrendered in 1646, an English pro-Royalist faction known as the Engagers allied with their former enemies to restore him to the English throne.

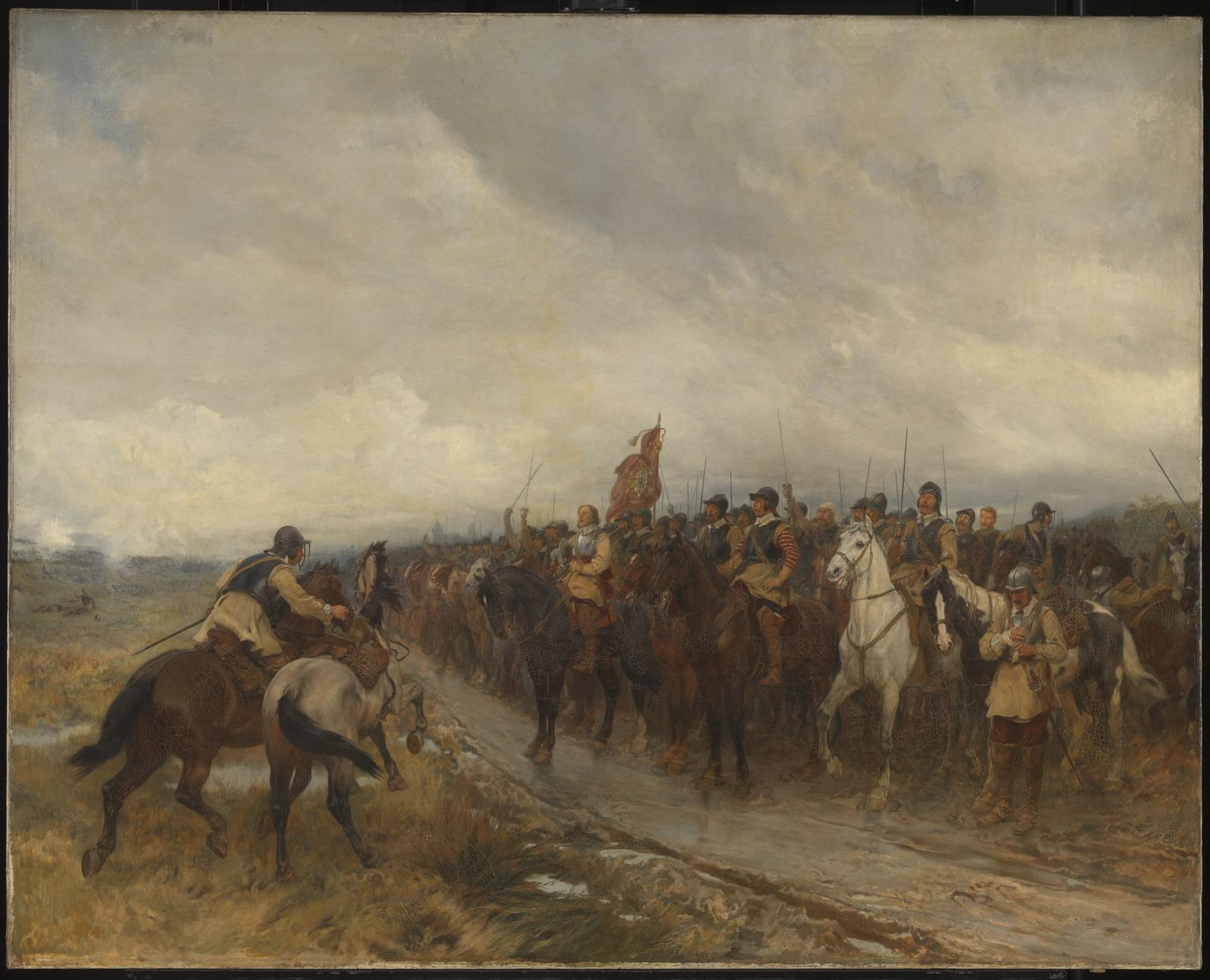
Cromwell at Dunbar by Andrew Carrick Gow. Scotland was incorporated into the Commonwealth after defeat in the 1650–1652 Anglo-Scots War.

After defeat in the 1647–1648 Second English Civil War, Scotland was occupied by English troops, which were withdrawn once those whom Cromwell held responsible had been replaced by the Kirk Party. In December 1648, Pride's Purge paved the way for the Trial of Charles I in England by excluding MPs who opposed it. Following the execution of Charles I in January 1649, and establishment of the Commonwealth of England, the Scots Kirk Party proclaimed Charles II King of Scots and England and, in the 1650 Treaty of Breda, resolved to restore him to the English throne. Instead, defeat in the Anglo-Scottish War resulted in Scotland's incorporation into the Commonwealth in 1653, largely driven by Cromwell's determination to break the power of the Scots kirk. The 1652 Tender of Union was followed on 12 April 1654 by An Ordinance by the Protector for the Union of England and Scotland, creating the Commonwealth of England and Scotland. It was ratified by the Second Protectorate Parliament on 26 June 1657, creating a single Parliament in Westminster, with 30 representatives each from Scotland and Ireland added to the existing English members.

=== 1660–1707 ===
While integration into the Commonwealth established free trade between Scotland and England, the economic benefits were diminished by the costs of military occupation. Both Scotland and England associated union with heavy taxes and military rule; it had little popular support in either Country, and the union was dissolved after the Restoration of Charles II in 1660.

The Scottish economy was badly damaged by the (protectionist) English Navigation Acts of 1660 and 1663 and England's wars with the Dutch Republic, Scotland's major export market. An Anglo-Scots Trade Commission was set up in January 1668 but the English had no interest in making concessions, as the Scots had little to offer in return. In 1669, Charles II revived talks on "political union"; his motives may have been to weaken Scotland's commercial and political links with the Dutch, still seen as an enemy and complete the work of his grandfather James I and VI. On the Scottish side, the proposed union received parliamentary support, boosted by the desire to ensure free trade. Continued opposition meant these negotiations were abandoned by the end of 1669.

Following the 1688 invasion of England by a Dutch fleet and army led by Prince William of Orange and his wife Mary (daughter of James II), and their deposition of James II as King of England, a Scottish Convention of the Estates (a sister body to the Parliament of Scotland) met in Edinburgh in April 1689 to agree a new Constitutional settlement for Scotland. The Convention of the Estates issued an address to William and Mary "as both kingdomes are united in one head and soveraigne so they may become one body pollitick, one nation to be represented in one parliament", reserving "our church government, as it shall be established at the tyme of the union". William and Mary were supportive of the idea but it was opposed both by the Presbyterian majority in Scotland and the English Parliament. Episcopacy in Scotland was abolished in 1690, alienating a significant part of the political class; it was this element that later formed the bedrock of opposition to Union.

The 1690s were a time of economic hardship in Europe as a whole and Scotland in particular, a period now known as the Seven ill years which led to strained relations with England. In 1698, the Company of Scotland Trading to Africa and the Indies received a charter to raise capital through public subscription. The Company invested in the Darién scheme, an ambitious plan funded almost entirely by Scottish investors to build a colony on the Isthmus of Panama for trade with East Asia. The scheme was a disaster; the losses of over £150,000 (Note: Equivalent to about £28 million in 2024.) severely impacted the Scottish commercial system.

== Political motivations ==
The International Treaty, and English and Scots acts of ratification of Union may be seen within a wider European context of increasing state centralisation during the late 17th and early 18th centuries, including the monarchies of France, Sweden, Denmark-Norway and Spain. While there were exceptions, such as the Dutch Republic or the Republic of Venice, the trend was clear.

=== Exclusion Crisis and Glorious Revolution ===
The dangers of the monarch using one parliament against the other first became apparent in 1647 and 1651. It resurfaced during the 1679 to 1681 Exclusion Crisis, caused by English resistance to the Catholic prince James (later James II of England, James VII of Scots) succeeding his brother Charles II. James was sent to Edinburgh in 1681 as Lord High Commissioner; in August, the Parliament of Scotland passed the Succession Act, confirming the divine right of kings, the rights of the natural heir "regardless of religion", the duty of all to swear allegiance to that king, and the Independence of the Scots Crown. It then went beyond ensuring James's succession to the Scots throne by explicitly stating the aim was to make his exclusion from the English throne impossible without "the fatall and dreadfull consequences of a civil war".

The issue reappeared during the 1688 Dutch invasion and coup d'etat (subsequently entitled as "the Glorious Revolution"). The English Convention Parliament generally supported replacing James with his Protestant daughter Mary, holding to their "legal fiction" that James, by fleeing to France, had abandoned his English subjects and "abdicated". They initially resisted making her Dutch husband William of Orange joint ruler but relented, "fearing the return of James" only when William threatened to take his troops and fleet and return to the Netherlands, and Mary refused to rule without him.

=== William's Claim of Right ===
In Scotland, it became a Constitutional issue. The fact that King James had not been present in Scotland meant that the question of abdication need not arise. On 4 April 1689 a Convention of the Three Estates of Scotland (sister body to the Parliament of Scotland) declared that James "had acted irregularly" by assuming regal power (government) "without ever taking the Coronation Oath required by Scots Law". Thus, he had "FOREFALTED [forfeited] the Right to the Scots Crown, and the Scots Throne is become vacant". This was a fundamental difference; if the Parliament of Scotland could decide James had "Forfaulted" his Scots throne by actions having, in the words of the "Claim of Right" act 1689 "Invaded the fundamentall Constitution of the Kingdome and altered it from a legall limited monarchy To ane arbitrary despotick power". "Scots monarchs derived legitimacy from the Convention of the Estates", later declared a Parliament of Scotland, not God, thus ending the principle of divine right of kings.

Enshrined in the Union with England Act 1707:

The haill other acts of parliament relating thereto in prosecution of the Declaration of the Estates of this kingdom containing the "Claim of Right" bearing date the eleventh of aprile one thousand six hundred and eighty nine.

Conflict over control of the kirk between Presbyterians and Episcopalians and William's position as a fellow Calvinist put him in a much stronger position. He originally insisted on retaining Episcopacy, and the Committee of the Articles, an unelected body that controlled what legislation Parliament could debate. Both would have given the Crown far greater control than in England but he withdrew his demands due to the 1689–1692 Jacobite Rising.

William's attempts to have the Claim of Right amended were directed through the "Court faction" which began arguing from 1699 onwards that:

1. The Convention of the Estates was not a parliament so the act did not really count as binding and
2. the Convention of the Estates was a parliament and so parliament could just rewrite it.

A year and a half after William's death, the Parliament of Scotland "put a period on the end of that sentence" by passing an act which recognised the standing of the Convention of the Estates as a parliament in its own right and made it "high treason" to impugn its authority or to so much as suggest attempting to alter the Claim of Right.

Here is the Claim of Right understood and upheld for its secular constitutional provisions quite as much as for its religious provisions.

Our sovereign lady, with advice and consent of the estates of parliament, ratites, approves and perpetually confirms the first act of King William and Queen Mary's parliament, dated 5 June 1689, entitled act declaring the meeting of the estates to be a parliament, and of new enacts and declares that the three estates then met together the said 5 June 1689, consisting of noblemen, barons and burghs, were a lawful and free parliament, and it is declared that it shall be "high treason" for any person to disown, quarrel or impugn the dignity and authority of the said Parliament. And further, the queen's majesty, with consent foresaid, statutes and declares that it shall be 'high treason' in any of the subjects of this kingdom to quarrel, impugn or endeavour by writing, malicious and advised speaking, or other open act or deed, to alter or innovate the Claim of Right or any article thereof.

=== English perspective ===
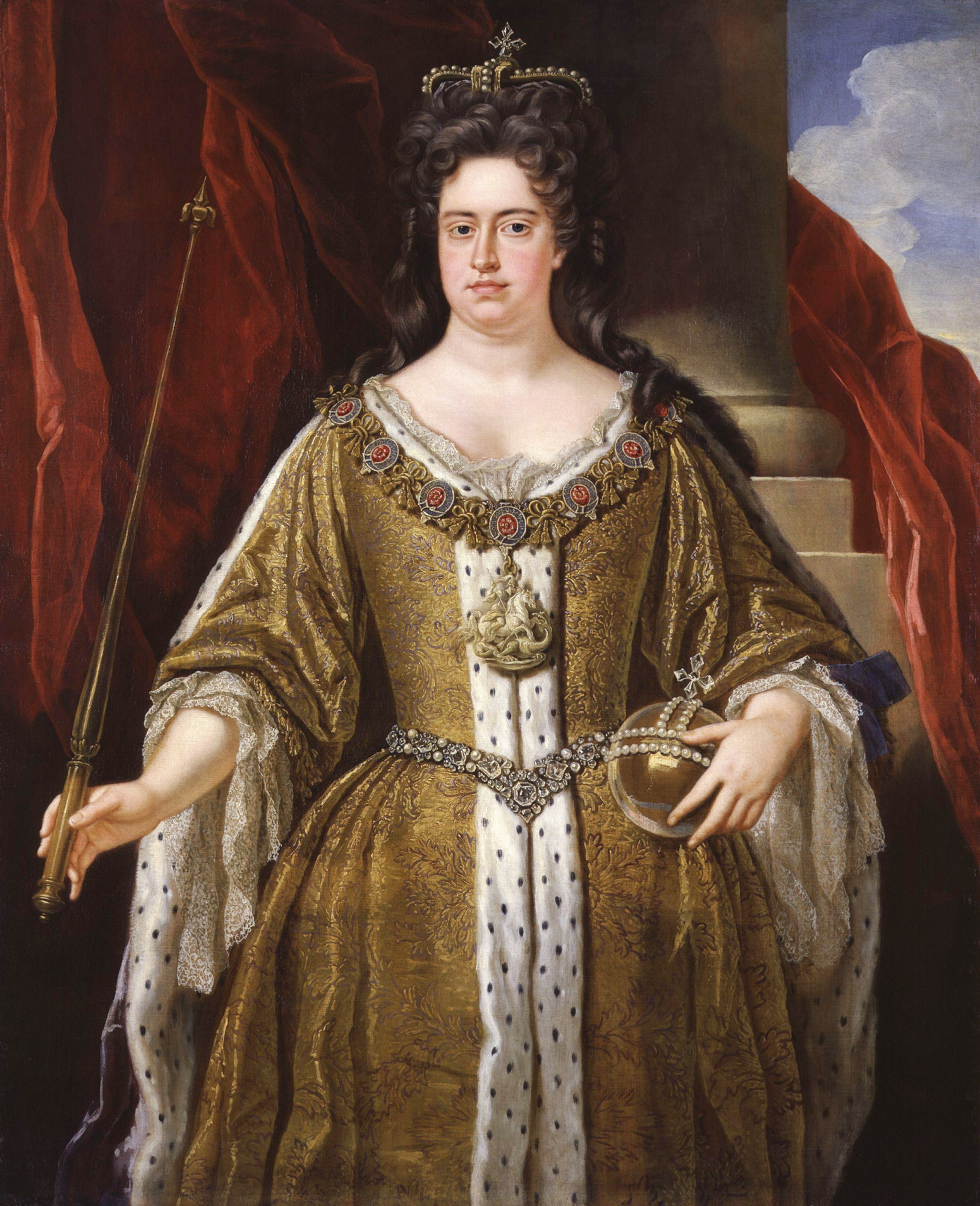
Queen Anne in 1702

The English succession was provided for by the English Act of Settlement 1701, which ensured that the monarch of England would be a Protestant member of the House of Hanover. Until the union of parliaments, the Scottish throne might be inherited by a different successor after Queen Anne, who had said in her first speech to the English parliament that a union was "very necessary". The Scottish Act of Security 1704, however, was passed after the English parliament, without consultation with Scotland, had designated Electoress Sophia of Hanover (granddaughter of James I and VI) as Anne's successor, if Anne died childless. The Act of Security granted the Parliament of Scotland, the three Estates, the right to choose a successor and explicitly required a choice different from the English monarch unless the English were to grant free trade and navigation. Then the Alien Act 1705 was passed in the English parliament, designating Scots in England as "foreign nationals" and blocking about half of all Scottish trade by boycotting exports to England or its colonies, unless Scotland came back to negotiate a Union. To encourage a union, "honours, appointments, pensions and even arrears of pay and other expenses were distributed to clinch support from Scottish peers and MPs".

=== Scottish perspective ===
The Scottish economy was severely impacted by privateers during the 1688–1697 Nine Years' War and the 1701 War of the Spanish Succession, with the Royal Navy focusing on protecting English ships. This compounded the economic pressure caused by the Darien scheme, and the seven ill years of the 1690s, when 5–15% of the population died of starvation. The Scottish Parliament was promised financial assistance, protection for its maritime trade, and an end to economic restrictions on trade with England.

The votes of the Court party, influenced by Queen Anne's favourite, James Douglas, 2nd Duke of Queensberry, combined with the majority of the Squadrone Volante, were sufficient to ensure passage of the treaty. Article 15 granted £398,085 and ten shillings sterling to Scotland, (Note: About £74 million in 2024.) a sum known as The Equivalent, to offset future liability towards the English national debt, which at the time was £18 million, (Note: About £3.3 billion in 2024.) but as Scotland had no national debt, most of the sum was used to compensate the investors in the Darien scheme, with 58.6% of the fund allocated to its shareholders and creditors.

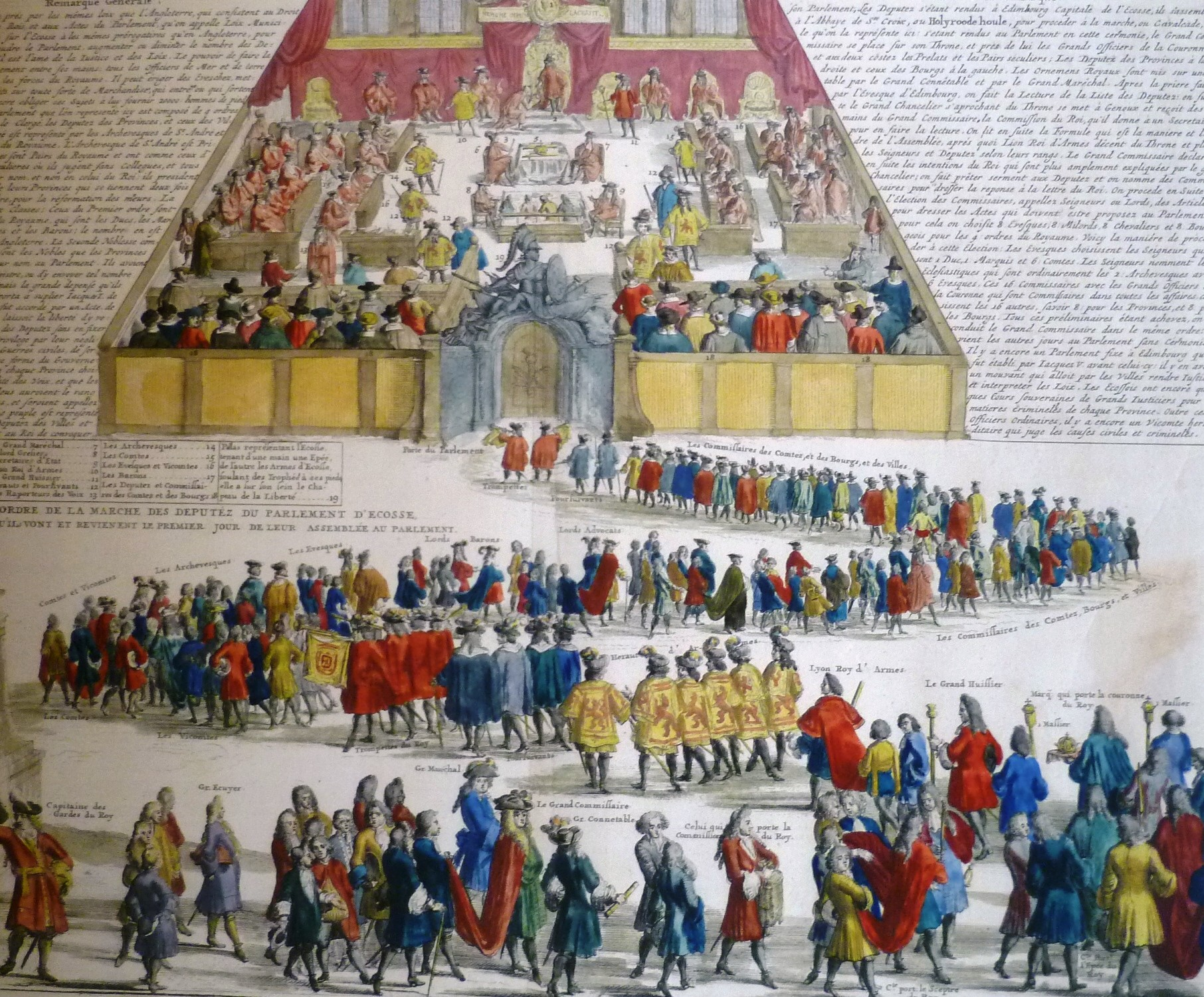
18th-century French illustration of an opening of the Scottish Parliament

The role played by bribery has long been debated. £20,000 was distributed by David Boyle, 1st Earl of Glasgow, (Note: About £3.7 million in 2024.) of which 60% went to the Duke of Queensberry, the Queen's Commissioner in Parliament. Another negotiator, John Campbell, 2nd Duke of Argyll was given an English dukedom.

Robert Burns is commonly quoted in support of the argument of corruption: "We're bought and sold for English Gold, Such a Parcel of Rogues in a Nation." As historian Christopher Whatley points out, this was actually a 17th-century Scots folk song, but he concedes that money was paid, although he also suggests that the economic benefits of the union were supported by most Scots MPs, albeit reluctantly, with promises made of benefits to peers and MPs. Professor Sir Tom Devine agreed that promises of "favours, sinecures, pensions, offices and straightforward cash bribes became indispensable to secure government majorities".

As for representation going forwards, Scotland was, in the new united parliament, only to get 45 MPs, one more than Cornwall, and only 16 (unelected) peers in the House of Lords.

There were mixed opinions in Scotland about the prospect of a union with England. Sir George Lockhart of Carnwath, the only Scottish negotiator to oppose Union, noted "the whole nation appears against (it)". Another negotiator, Sir John Clerk of Penicuik, who was an ardent Unionist, observed it was "contrary to the inclinations of at least three-fourths of the Kingdom". As the seat of the Scottish Parliament, demonstrators in Edinburgh feared the impact of its loss on the local economy. Elsewhere, there was widespread concern about the independence of the kirk, and possible tax rises. Virtually all of the print discourses of 1699–1706 spoke against incorporating union, creating the conditions for widespread rejection of the treaty in 1706 and 1707. In the wake of unionist proselytising in the autumn of 1706 and early 1707, many Scots were undecided about the prospect of a union. Rather, there was considerably more support in Scotland for a federal union with England than an incorporative one, similar to the devolved Scottish parliament that would be established within Britain nearly three centuries later.

As the treaty passed through the Parliament of Scotland, opposition was voiced by petitions from shires, burghs, presbyteries and parishes. The Convention of Royal Burghs claimed:

we are not against an honourable and safe union with England, [... but] the condition of the people of Scotland, (cannot be) improved without a Scots Parliament.

According to Scottish historian William Ferguson, the Acts of Union were a "political job" by England that was achieved by economic incentives, patronage and bribery to secure the passage of the Union treaty in the Scottish Parliament in order satisfy English political imperatives, with the union being unacceptable to the Scottish people, including both the Jacobites and Covenanters. The differences between Scottish were "subsumed by the same sort of patriotism or nationalism that first appeared in the Declaration of Arbroath of 1320." Ferguson highlights the well-timed payments of salary arrears to members of Parliament as proof of bribery and argues that the Scottish people had been betrayed by their Parliament. According to Christopher Whatley, however, calls for a union with England began in Scotland itself in the 1690s for the purpose of safeguarding the law, line of succession, and to improve the economy.

=== Ireland ===
Ireland, though a kingdom under the same crown, was not included in the union. It remained a separate kingdom, unrepresented in Parliament, and was legally subordinate to Great Britain until the Renunciation Act 1783.

In July 1707 each House of the Parliament of Ireland passed a congratulatory address to Queen Anne, praying that "May God put it in your royal heart to add greater strength and lustre to your crown, by a still more comprehensive Union". The British government did not respond to the invitation and an equal union between Great Britain and Ireland was out of consideration until the 1790s. The union with Ireland finally came about on 1 January 1801.

== Treaty and passage of the 1707 acts ==
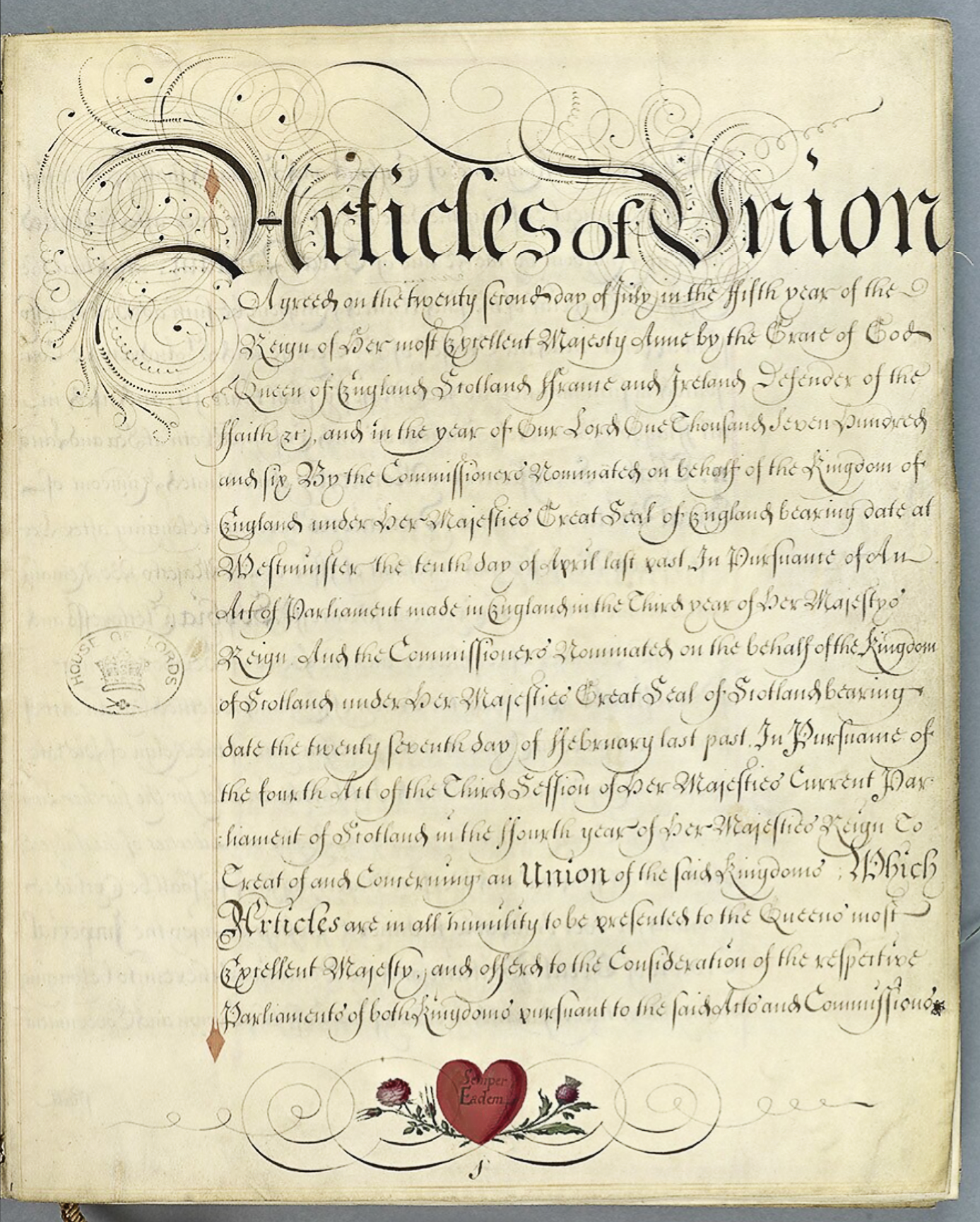
"Articles of Union otherwise known as Treaty of Union", 1707

Deeper political integration had been a key policy of Queen Anne from the time she acceded to the throne in 1702. Under the aegis of the Queen and her ministers in both kingdoms, the parliaments of England and Scotland (the Act for a Treaty with England 1705) agreed to participate in fresh negotiations for a union treaty in 1705.

Both countries appointed 31 commissioners to conduct the negotiations. Most of the Scottish commissioners favoured union, and about half were government ministers and other officials. At the head of the list was the Duke of Queensberry, and the Lord Chancellor of Scotland, the Earl of Seafield. The English commissioners included the Lord High Treasurer, Sidney Godolphin, 1st Earl of Godolphin, the Lord Keeper of the Great Seal, William Cowper, Baron Cowper, and a large number of Whigs who supported union. Tories were not in favour of union and only one was represented among the commissioners.

Negotiations between the English and Scottish commissioners took place between 16 April and 22 July 1706 at the Cockpit in London. Each side had its own particular concerns. Within a few days, and with only one face to face meeting of all 62 commissioners, England had gained a guarantee that the Hanoverian dynasty would succeed Queen Anne to the Scottish crown, and Scotland received a guarantee of access to colonial markets, in the hope that they would be placed on an equal footing in terms of trade.

After negotiations ended in July 1706, the acts had to be ratified by both Parliaments. In Scotland, about 100 of the 227 members of the Parliament of Scotland were supportive of the Court Party. For extra votes the pro-court side could rely on about 25 members of the Squadrone Volante, led by the James Graham, 4th Marquess of Montrose and John Ker, 1st Duke of Roxburghe. Opponents of the court were generally known as the Country party, and included various factions and individuals such as the James Hamilton, 4th Duke of Hamilton, John Hamilton, Lord Belhaven and Andrew Fletcher of Saltoun, who spoke forcefully and passionately against the union, when the Scottish Parliament began its debate on the act on 3 October 1706, but the deal had already been done. The Court party enjoyed significant funding from England and the Treasury and included many who had accumulated debts following the Darien Disaster.

The act ratifying the Treaty of Union was finally carried in the Parliament of Scotland by 110 votes to 69 on 16 January 1707, with a number of key amendments. News of the ratification and of the amendments was received in Westminster, where the Act was passed quickly through both Houses and received the royal assent on 6 March. Though the English Act was later in date, it bore the year '1706' while Scotland's was '1707', as the legal year in England began only on 25 March.

In Scotland, the Duke of Queensberry was largely responsible for the successful passage of the Union act by the Parliament of Scotland. In Scotland, he was greeted by stones and eggs but in England he was cheered for his action. He had personally received around half of the funding awarded by the Westminster Treasury. In April 1707, he travelled to London to attend celebrations at the royal court, and was greeted by groups of noblemen and gentry lined along the road. From Barnet, the route was lined with crowds of cheering people, and once he reached London a huge crowd had formed. On 17 April, the Duke was gratefully received by the Queen at Kensington Palace and the Acts came into effect on 1 May 1707. A day of thanksgiving was declared in England but not in Scotland, where the bells of St Giles rang out the tune of "why should I be so sad on my wedding day".

== Provisions ==
Heraldic badge of Queen Anne, depicting the Tudor rose and the Scottish thistle growing from the same stem

The Treaty of Union, agreed between representatives of the Parliament of England and the Parliament of Scotland in 1706, consisted of 25 articles, 15 of which were economic in nature. In Scotland, each article was voted on separately and several clauses in articles were delegated to specialised subcommittees. Article 1 of the treaty was based on the political principle of an incorporating union and this was secured by a majority of 116 votes to 83 on 4 November 1706. To minimise the opposition of the Church of Scotland, an Act was also passed to secure the Presbyterian establishment of the Church, after which the Church stopped its open opposition, although hostility remained at lower levels of the clergy. The treaty as a whole was finally ratified on 16 January 1707 by a majority of 110 votes to 69.

The two Acts incorporated provisions for Scotland to send representative peers from the Peerage of Scotland to sit in the House of Lords. It guaranteed that the Church of Scotland would remain the established church in Scotland, that the Court of Session would "remain in all time coming within Scotland", and that Scots law would "remain in the same force as before". Other provisions included the restatement of the Act of Settlement 1701 and the ban on Roman Catholics from taking the throne. It also created a customs union and monetary union.

The Act provided that any "laws and statutes" that were "contrary to or inconsistent with the terms" of the Act would "cease and become void".

=== Related acts ===
The Scottish Parliament also passed the Protestant Religion and Presbyterian Church Act 1707 guaranteeing the status of the Presbyterian Church of Scotland. The English Parliament passed a similar Act, 6 Ann. c. 8.

Soon after the Union, the Act 6 Ann. c. 40—later named the Union with Scotland (Amendment) Act 1707—united the Privy Council of England and Privy Council of Scotland and decentralised Scottish administration by appointing justices of the peace in each shire to carry out administration. In effect it took the day-to-day government of Scotland out of the hands of politicians and into those of the College of Justice.

On 18 December 1707 the Act for better Securing the Duties of East India Goods was passed which extended the monopoly of the East India Company to Scotland.

In the year following the Union, the Treason Act 1708 abolished the Scottish law of treason and extended the corresponding English law across Great Britain.

== Evaluations ==
Scotland benefited, says historian G.N. Clark, gaining "freedom of trade with England and the colonies" as well as "a great expansion of markets". The agreement guaranteed the permanent status of the Presbyterian church in Scotland, and the separate system of laws and courts in Scotland. Clark argued that in exchange for the financial benefits and bribes that England bestowed, what it gained was

of inestimable value. Scotland accepted the Hanoverian succession and gave up her power of threatening England's military security and complicating her commercial relations ... The sweeping successes of the eighteenth-century wars owed much to the new unity of the two nations.

Despite initial opposition to the union by many Scots, there were paradoxically more protests from Scots in the eighteenth century over what they believed was the Westminster parliament's disregard for the union, with Lord Deskford commenting to the Prime Minister, the Duke of Newcastle, in 1755 on the "anxiety" among Scots about "any thing they conceive to be contrary to the union." By the time Samuel Johnson and James Boswell made their tour in 1773, recorded in A Journey to the Western Islands of Scotland, Johnson noted that Scotland was "a nation of which the commerce is hourly extending, and the wealth increasing" and in particular that Glasgow had become one of the greatest cities of Britain.

== Economic perspective ==
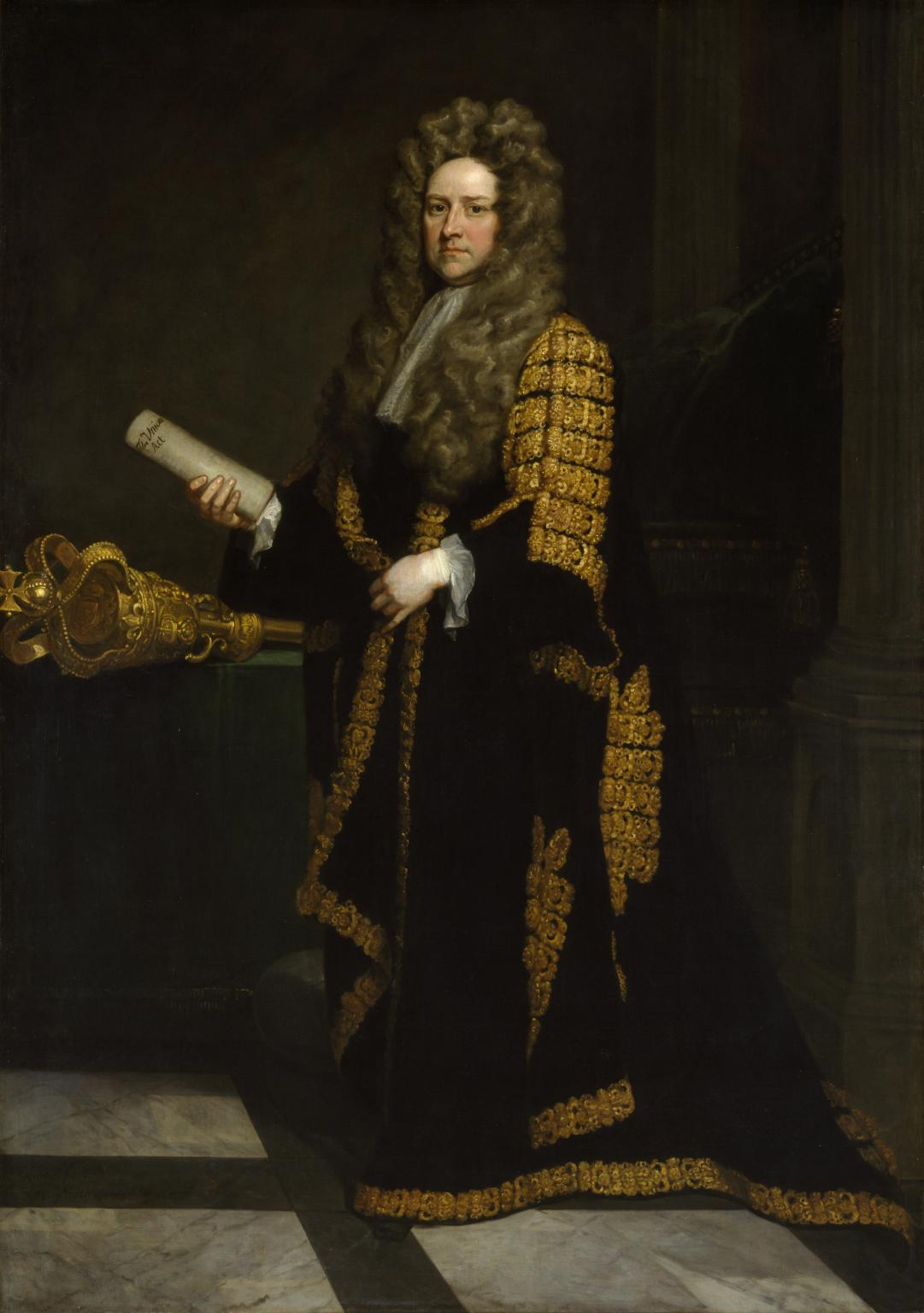
Portrait of John Smith by Godfrey Kneller, 1708. Smith was one of the commissioners who negotiated the union and was Speaker of the House of Commons in the new united parliament. He is shown by Kneller holding a copy of the Act of Union.

According to the Scottish historian Christopher Smout, prior to the Union of the Crowns the Scottish economy had been flourishing completely independently of the English one, and that it only took a downturn in the wake of English wars, particularly the English Civil War, and due to what was believed to be English sabotage on Scottish economic ambitions. However, the Scottish economy was lagging behind not only from the impact of wars, but also because of chronic deflation and industrial underdevelopment. Scotland remained a predominantly agrarian society, and the lack of manpower caused by previous conflicts contributed to an underwhelming agricultural output, which intermittently escalated into local food shortages or famines. In turn, the overreliance of Scottish landowners on foreign goods led to a deficit of financial capital, as gold and silver were exported overseas and deflation occurred. The Scottish Parliament attempted to combat the issue by attracting foreign investment; duty on ship building materials was lifted, taxes on new manufacturing stocks were cut, and customs on textile and linen goods were removed.

Scotland grew increasingly dependent on its linen industry, which became the biggest source of employment after agriculture and constituted one-third of Scottish industry. Continental linen industries could outcompete Scotland, and protectionist tariffs implemented by Scotland led to tariff wars as European countries closed their markets to Scotland. In this situation, England became the largest foreign market for Scottish linen; however, while the tariffs in place shielded Scotland from the much larger English industry, England also retaliated against them. This forced Scotland to seek economic alternatives. At the time, trade with colonies was rapidly growing in importance in Europe, and trade with colonies was very attractive to Scotland, given its pastoral economy. American colonies had a high demand of agricultural goods such as leather skins of goats and sheep, which would have provided Scotland a valuable source of income. Search for colonial trade, along with the frustration caused by economic and political rivalry with England, led to the Darien scheme – an unsuccessful attempt to establish a Scottish colony in the Gulf of Darién.

The scheme was sabotaged by England in various ways – it was seen as a threat to the privileged position of the East India Company, prompting England to ensure the plan's failure via political and diplomatic overtures to prevent the Netherlands and Hamburg from investing into the scheme and denying assistance. In what was dubbed the "affair of Hamburgh" in Scotland, William III of England persuaded European powers against buying stocks in the scheme; William commented on Darien:

I have been ill-served in Scotland; but I hope some remedies may be found to prevent the inconveniences which may arise from this Act.

English actions against the Darien scheme were also motivated by other factors – the decline in the East India Company's stock values, concerns of Darien causing a labour shortage in the Colony of Jamaica, and the scheme being seen as a threat to "the general peace of Christendom", as Catholic Spain laid a territorial claim to the area.

The failure of the Darien scheme led to a financial crisis in Scotland. The high cost of its project exacerbated the deflation in Scotland. The Bank of Scotland had dangerously low reserves, and in early 1700s a run on the bank occurred, along with temporary suspension of business. Ultimately, the Scottish bank managed to stay solvent, although the persisting deflation and low reserves largely contributed to the feeling of Scottish economy being in a precarious position. Economist Aida Ramos argues that the Darien scheme could have succeeded if it was to receive support from either England or Spain, and that it lacked the capability to create a threat to England or its interests. According to Ramos, the English intervention against the scheme was to meet the expansionary aims of England, as to ensure both its colonial dominance as well as the annexation of Scotland.

By 1703, the Scottish government was highly disillusioned with the union, and many believed that the only way to let the Scottish economy flourish was to separate from England. John Clerk of Eldin declared that "the Scots had become England's slaves, since they were denied not only their rights as fellow-Britons but their rights under the Law of Nations", and writer David Black wrote: "England affords us but little of what is necessary, yet they drain us more than any nation". The anti-English sentiment led to accusation of King William orchestrating the 1699 Glencoe Massacre, and in 1703 the Scottish Parliament started adopting legislation to counter the English aggression – the first was the Act Anent Peace and War, which was to guarantee that the Scottish foreign policy would be independent of England. Scotland would try to establish further autonomy from England with the Act of Security 1704, which provoked a retaliation from England – Scottish ministers were bribed, and Alien Act 1705 was passed. According to the Alien Act, unless Scotland appointed commissioners to negotiate for union by Christmas, every Scot in England would be treated as an alien, leading to the confiscation of their English estates. Additionally, Scottish wares were to be banned from England. According to Christopher Smout, England desired to expand its influence by annexing Scotland:

In sum, England was now seeking Parliamentary Union for political reasons at a moment when the Scots had become dissatisfied with Regal Union for economic reasons: and one of the main weapons chosen by the English to enforce their will was the threat of economic sanctions. The repeal of the Alien Act before it could come into force scarcely reduced its menace: a big stick is a big stick, even if it is replaced in the cupboard unused.

The act sparked vehement anti-English sentiment in Scotland, and made the already hostile Scottish public more opposed to England:

The crew of an English East Indiaman, the Worcester, that had put into Leith to escape a storm was arrested on a spurious charge of piracy and executed after a parody of a trial, victims of a wave of anti-English hysteria which the Ministers of the Crown dared not be seen to oppose. As late as June, the Scottish Unionist Cockburn of Ormiston declared he could not find ten men in Parliament willing to join England in a full Union – an exaggeration no doubt, but an indication of the contemporary force of feeling.

The Scottish economy was now facing a crisis, and the parliament was polarised into pro-union and anti-union factions, with the former led by Daniel Defoe. The unionists stressed how important trade with England is to the Scottish economy, and seen trade with continental Europe as not beneficial. They argued that the Scottish economy could survive by trading with England, and sanctions that would result from the Alien Act would collapse the economy. For Defoe, joining the union would not only prevent the Alien Act, but also remove additional limitations and regulations and lead Scotland to prosperity. Anti-unionists questioned the English goodwill and criticised the unionist faction for submitting to the English blackmail. They argued that Scotland could make a recovery by trading with the Netherlands, Spain and Norway, allowing Scotland to diversify its own industries as well. They argued that the union would make Scotland unable to conduct independent trade policy, meaning that any possibility to remove the flaws in Scottish economy would be gone forever, which would turn Scotland into a "mere satellite of the richer kingdom".

Ultimately, Scottish ministers voted in favour of the union, despite the lack of public support, with the overwhelming majority of the Scottish population at the time protesting vociferously against any union with England. Many Scots considered themselves to have been betrayed by their own elites, and that the union bill was able to pass only thanks to English bribery. In the first few decades after the union, England did not end up becoming the main trading partner of Scotland, as other European powers became the primary source of imported goods for Scotland. For at least the first 40 years after the union, Scotland persisted in its traditional trade patterns, and the economic situation of Scotland was not as dire as that described in the months leading up to the Acts of Union. Christopher Whatley writes, however, that by 1799, it was reported that the union of Scotland with England had not only benefitted the Scottish economy, but promoted a "commercial prosperity" unknown to any people.

== 300th anniversary ==
The £2 coin issued in the United Kingdom in 2007 to commemorate the 300th anniversary of the Acts of Union

A commemorative two-pound coin was issued to mark the tercentennial—300th anniversary—of the Union, which occurred two days before the Scottish Parliament general election on 3 May 2007.

The Scottish Government held a number of commemorative events through the year including an education project led by the Royal Commission on the Ancient and Historical Monuments of Scotland, an exhibition of Union-related objects and documents at the National Museums of Scotland and an exhibition of portraits of people associated with the Union at the National Galleries of Scotland.

== Scottish voting records ==
Map of commissioner voting on the ratification of the Treaty of Union: All (or sole) Commissioners absent All Commissioners present voting for Union Majority of Commissioners present voting for Union Equal number of Commissioners voting for and against Majority of Commissioners present voting against Union All Commissioners present voting against Union

Voting records for 16 January 1707 ratification of the Treaty of Union
Commissioner	Constituency/Position	Party	Vote
James Graham, 1st Duke of Montrose	Lord President of the Council of Scotland/Stirlingshire	Court Party	Yes
John Campbell, 2nd Duke of Argyll		Court Party	Yes
John Hay, 2nd Marquess of Tweeddale		Squadrone Volante	Yes
William Kerr, 2nd Marquess of Lothian		Court Party	Yes
John Erskine, Earl of Mar		Court Party	Yes
John Gordon, 16th Earl of Sutherland		Court Party	Yes
John Hamilton-Leslie, 9th Earl of Rothes		Squadrone Volante	Yes
James Douglas, 11th Earl of Morton			Yes
William Cunningham, 12th Earl of Glencairn			Yes
James Hamilton, 6th Earl of Abercorn			Yes
John Ker, 1st Duke of Roxburghe		Squadrone Volante	Yes
Thomas Hamilton, 6th Earl of Haddington			Yes
John Maitland, 5th Earl of Lauderdale			Yes
David Wemyss, 4th Earl of Wemyss			Yes
William Ramsay, 5th Earl of Dalhousie			Yes
James Ogilvy, 4th Earl of Findlater	Banffshire		Yes
David Leslie, 3rd Earl of Leven			Yes
David Carnegie, 4th Earl of Northesk			Yes
Colin Lindsay, 3rd Earl of Balcarres			Yes
Archibald Douglas, 1st Earl of Forfar			Yes
William Boyd, 3rd Earl of Kilmarnock			Yes
John Keith, 1st Earl of Kintore			Yes
Patrick Hume, 1st Earl of Marchmont		Squadrone Volante	Yes
George Mackenzie, 1st Earl of Cromartie			Yes
Archibald Primrose, 1st Earl of Rosebery			Yes
David Boyle, 1st Earl of Glasgow			Yes
Charles Hope, 1st Earl of Hopetoun	likely Linlithgowshire		Yes
Henry Scott, 1st Earl of Deloraine			Yes
Archibald Campbell, Earl of Illay			Yes
William Hay, Viscount Dupplin			Yes
William Forbes, 12th Lord Forbes			Yes
John Elphinstone, 8th Lord Elphinstone			Yes
William Ross, 12th Lord Ross			Yes
James Sandilands, 7th Lord Torphichen			Yes
Lord Fraser			Yes
George Ogilvy, 3rd Lord Banff			Yes
Alexander Murray, 4th Lord Elibank			Yes
Kenneth Sutherland, 3rd Lord Duffus			Yes
Robert Rollo, 4th Lord Rollo	Stirlingshire		Yes
James Murray, Lord Philiphaugh	Lord Clerk Register/Selkirkshire		Yes
Adam Cockburn, Lord Ormiston	Lord Justice Clerk		Yes
Sir Robert Dickson of Inverask	Edinburghshire		Yes
William Nisbet of Dirletoun	Haddingtonshire	Squadrone Volante	Yes
John Cockburn, younger, of Ormestoun	Haddingtonshire	Squadrone Volante	Yes
Sir John Swintoun of that ilk	Berwickshire	Court Party	Yes
Sir Alexander Campbell of Cessnock	Berwickshire		Yes
Sir William Kerr of Greenhead	Roxburghshire	Squadrone Volante	Yes
Archibald Douglas, 13th of Cavers	Roxburghshire	Court Party	Yes
William Bennet of Grubbet	Roxburghshire	Court Party	Yes
Mr John Murray of Bowhill	Selkirkshire	Court Party	Yes
Mr John Pringle of Haining	Selkirkshire	Court Party	Yes
William Morison of Prestongrange	Peeblesshire	Court Party	Yes
Alexander Horseburgh of that ilk	Peeblesshire		Yes
George Baillie of Jerviswood	Lanarkshire	Squadrone Volante	Yes
Sir John Johnstoun of Westerhall	Dumfriesshire	Court Party	Yes
William Dowglass of Dornock	Dumfriesshire		Yes
Mr William Stewart of Castlestewart	Wigtownshire		Yes
Mr John Stewart of Sorbie	Wigtownshire	Court Party	Yes
Mr Francis Montgomery of Giffan	Ayrshire	Court Party	Yes
Mr William Dalrymple of Glenmuir	Ayrshire	Court Party	Yes
Mr Robert Stewart of Tillicultrie	Buteshire		Yes
Sir Robert Pollock of that ilk	Renfrewshire	Court Party	Yes
Mr John Montgomery of Wrae	Linlithgowshire		Yes
John Halden of Glenagies	Perthshire	Squadrone Volante	Yes
Mongo Graham of Gorthie	Perthshire	Squadrone Volante	Yes
Sir Thomas Burnet of Leyes	Kincardineshire	Court Party	Yes
William Seton, younger, of Pitmedden	Aberdeenshire	Squadrone Volante	Yes
Alexander Grant, younger, of that ilk	Inverness-shire	Court Party	Yes
Sir William Mackenzie			Yes
Mr Aeneas McLeod of Cadboll	Cromartyshire		Yes
Mr John Campbell of Mammore	Argyllshire	Court Party	Yes
Sir James Campbell of Auchinbreck	Argyllshire	Court Party	Yes
James Campbell, younger, of Ardkinglass	Argyllshire	Court Party	Yes
Sir William Anstruther of that ilk	Fife		Yes
James Halyburton of Pitcurr	Forfarshire	Squadrone Volante	Yes
Alexander Abercrombie of Glassoch	Banffshire	Court Party	Yes
Mr James Dunbarr, younger, of Hemprigs	Caithness		Yes
Alexander Douglas of Eagleshay	Orkney and Shetland	Court Party	Yes
Sir John Bruce, 2nd Baronet	Kinross-shire	Squadrone Volante	Yes
John Scrimsour	Dundee		Yes
Lieutenant Colonel John Areskine			Yes
John Mure	Likely Ayr		Yes
James Scott	Montrose	Court Party	Yes
Sir John Anstruther, 1st Baronet, of Anstruther	Anstruther Easter		Yes
James Spittle	Inverkeithing		Yes
Mr Patrick Moncrieff	Kinghorn	Court Party	Yes
Sir Andrew Home	Kirkcudbright	Squadrone Volante	Yes
Sir Peter Halket	Dunfermline	Squadrone Volante	Yes
Sir James Smollet	Dumbarton	Court Party	Yes
Mr William Carmichell	Lanark		Yes
Mr William Sutherland	Elgin		Yes
Captain Daniel McLeod	Tain		Yes
Sir David Dalrymple, 1st Baronet	Culross	Court Party	Yes
Sir Alexander Ogilvie	Banff		Yes
Mr John Clerk	Whithorn	Court Party	Yes
John Ross			Yes
Hew Dalrymple, Lord North Berwick	North Berwick		Yes
Mr Patrick Ogilvie	Cullen	Court Party	Yes
George Allardyce	Kintore	Court Party	Yes
William Avis			Yes
Mr James Bethun	Kilrenny		Yes
Mr Roderick McKenzie	Fortrose		Yes
John Urquhart	Dornoch		Yes
Daniel Campbell	Inveraray	Court Party	Yes
Sir Robert Forbes	Inverurie		Yes
Mr Robert Dowglass	Kirkwall		Yes
Mr Alexander Maitland	Inverbervie	Court Party	Yes
Mr George Dalrymple	Stranraer		Yes
Mr Charles Campbell	Campbeltown		Yes
James Hamilton, 4th Duke of Hamilton			No
William Johnstone, 1st Marquess of Annandale	Annan		No
Charles Hay, 13th Earl of Erroll			No
William Keith, 9th Earl Marischal			No
David Erskine, 9th Earl of Buchan			No
Alexander Sinclair, 9th Earl of Caithness			No
John Fleming, 6th Earl of Wigtown			No
James Stewart, 5th Earl of Galloway			No
David Murray, 5th Viscount of Stormont			No
William Livingston, 3rd Viscount of Kilsyth			No
William Fraser, 12th Lord Saltoun			No
Francis Sempill, 10th Lord Sempill			No
Charles Oliphant, 7th Lord Oliphant			No
John Elphinstone, 4th Lord Balmerino			No
Walter Stuart, 6th Lord Blantyre	Linlithgow		No
William Hamilton, 3rd Lord Bargany	Queensferry		No
John Hamilton, 2nd Lord Belhaven and Stenton			No
Lord Colvill			No
Patrick Kinnaird, 3rd Lord Kinnaird			No
Sir John Lawder of Fountainhall	Haddingtonshire		No
Andrew Fletcher of Saltoun	Haddingtonshire		No
Sir Robert Sinclair, 3rd Baronet	Berwickshire		No
Sir Patrick Home of Rentoun	Berwickshire		No
Sir Gilbert Elliot of Minto	Roxburghshire		No
William Bayllie of Lamingtoun	Lanarkshire		No
John Sinclair, younger, of Stevensone	Lanarkshire		No
James Hamilton of Aikenhead	Lanarkshire		No
Mr Alexander Fergusson of Isle	Dumfriesshire		No
Sir Hugh Cathcart of Carletoun	Ayrshire		No
John Brisbane, younger, of Bishoptoun	Ayrshire		No
Mr William Cochrane of Kilmaronock	Dumbartonshire		No
Sir Humphray Colquhoun of Luss	Dumbartonshire		No
Sir John Houstoun of that ilk	Renfrewshire		No
Robert Rollo of Powhouse			No
Thomas Sharp of Houstoun	Linlithgowshire		No
John Murray of Strowan			No
Alexander Gordon of Pitlurg	Aberdeenshire		No
John Forbes of Colloden	Nairnshire		No
David Bethun of Balfour	Fife		No
Major Henry Balfour of Dunboog	Fife		No
Mr Thomas Hope of Rankeillor			No
Mr Patrick Lyon of Auchterhouse	Forfarshire		No
Mr James Carnagie of Phinhaven	Forfarshire		No
David Graham, younger, of Fintrie	Forfarshire		No
William Maxwell of Cardines	Kirkcudbrightshire		No
Alexander McKye of Palgown	Kirkcudbrightshire		No
James Sinclair of Stempster	Caithness		No
Sir Henry Innes, younger, of that ilk	Elginshire		No
Mr George McKenzie of Inchcoulter	Ross-shire		No
Robert Inglis	Edinburgh		No
Alexander Robertson	Perth		No
Walter Stewart			No
Hugh Montgomery	Glasgow	Court Party	No
Alexander Edgar	Haddington		No
Alexander Duff	Banffshire		No
Francis Molison	Brechin		No
Walter Scott	Jedburgh		No
Robert Scott	Selkirk		No
Robert Kellie	Dunbar		No
John Hutchesone	Arbroath		No
Archibald Scheills	Peebles		No
Mr John Lyon	Forfar		No
George Brodie	Forres		No
George Spens	Rutherglen		No
Sir David Cuningham	Lauder		No
Mr John Carruthers	Lochmaben		No
George Home	New Galloway		No
John Bayne	Dingwall		No
Mr Robert Fraser	Wick		No
Total Ayes			106
Total Noes			69
Total Votes			175

== See also ==
- Acts of Union 1800 (Kingdom of Great Britain with Kingdom of Ireland)
  - Kingdom of Ireland – Dependency of England and then of Great Britain (1542–1800)
- English independence – Political movement in the United Kingdom
- List of treaties
- MacCormick v Lord Advocate – Scottish law case over regnal number of Elizabeth II
- Parliament of the United Kingdom
- Political union – Union of smaller states or governments
- Real union – Partial unification of two states
- Nueva Planta decrees (1707 to 1715) – Acts annexing Aragon, Catalonia, Valencia and Majorca into the Kingdom of Spain
- Scottish independence – Political movement for Scotland leaving the UK
- Unionism in Scotland – Political movement favouring continuance of the UK
- Welsh independence – Welsh political philosophy
