= Christopher Whatley =

Scottish historian

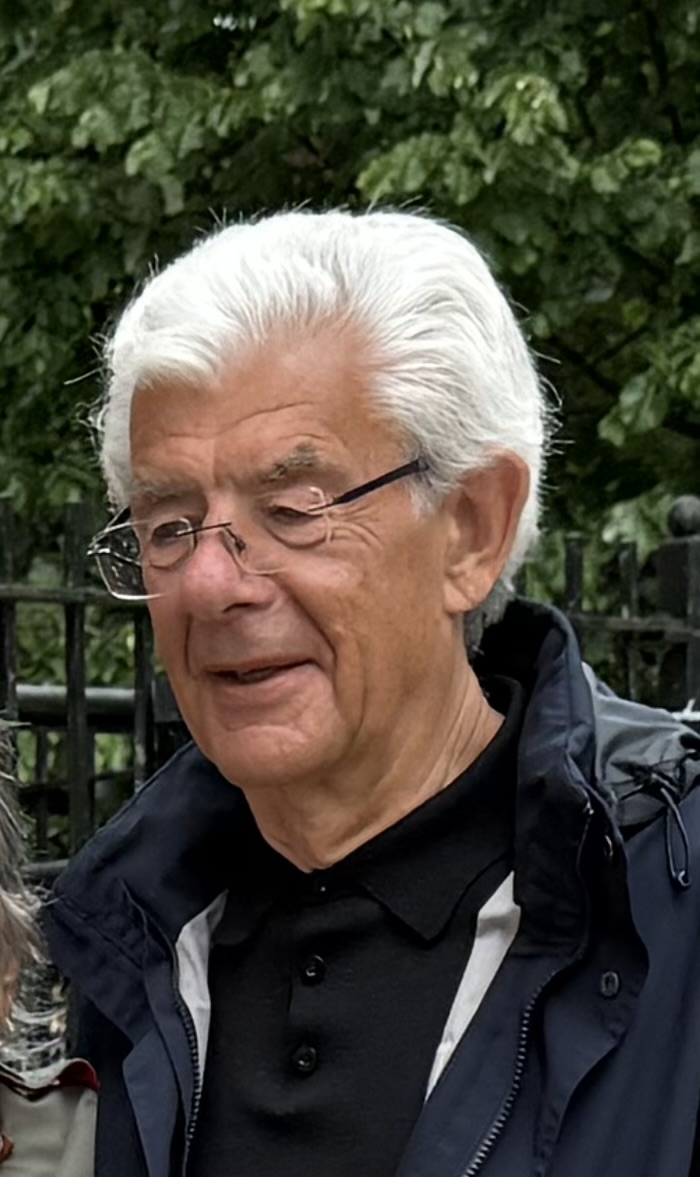
- Born: Christopher Allan Whatley; May 29, 1948 (age 78)
- Known for: Contributions to Scottish history

Academic background
- Education: University of Strathclyde

Academic work
- Institutions: University of Dundee

Christopher Allan Whatley FRSE FRHistS OBE is a Scottish historian. He has been Professor of Scottish History at the University of Dundee since 1997. He is a prominent opponent of Scottish independence and chaired the inaugural meeting of the local Better Together campaign in Dundee during the 2014 Scottish independence referendum.

== Biography ==
Whatley left school at 16 years of age, and worked as a shop assistant and semi-skilled machine operator before attending night classes and taking Highers at Clydebank College in order to obtain a place at the University of Strathclyde. He graduated with a BA in Economic History in 1972, and completed his PhD there in 1975 on the process of industrialisation in Ayrshire.

== Career ==
Following postgraduate study, Whatley lectured in economic history at Ayr College from 1975 to 1979. He joined the University of Dundee's Department of History in 1979 and taught Scottish history at the University of St Andrews from 1988 to 1992 before returning to Dundee as Bonar Professor of Modern History.

At Dundee, Whatley served as head of the Department of History from 1995 to 2002 and became Professor of Scottish History in 1997. He was dean of the Faculty of Arts and Social Sciences from 2002 to 2006, followed by vice-principal and head of the College of Arts and Social Sciences from 2006 to 2014. His research focused on Scottish economic, political and social history. After retiring from university administration, he became professor emeritus of Scottish History at Dundee.

== Research ==
Whatley's research focuses on Scotland's political, economic and social history from the seventeenth to the nineteenth centuries. His work examines the 1707 Acts of Union, economic development, industrialization and the relationship between Scotland and Britain.

His research on the Union has examined the political and commercial interests that shaped parliamentary debates and the circumstances surrounding its passage. In The Scots and the Union, he challenged explanations based solely on economic necessity or political coercion, examining the range of motives behind support for and opposition to the measure.

Whatley has also studied Scotland's economic development, including agriculture, manufacturing, trade and urbanization. His research on Dundee examines the city's commercial and maritime history, the jute industry and its growth as an industrial centre during the nineteenth century.

Other areas of his scholarship include Scottish national identity, the Scottish Enlightenment and the historical reception of Robert Burns. His work on Burns considers his place in Scottish cultural and political life and the ways in which his legacy has been interpreted over time.

== Awards ==
Whatley is a Fellow of the Royal Society of Edinburgh. In the 2015 New Year Honours, Whatley was appointed an Officer of the Order of the British Empire (OBE) for services to Scottish history and higher education.
