= Alexander Douglas of Eagleshay =

Scottish politician

Sir Alexander Douglas of Eagleshay (Egilsay), Lord of Egilshay (died January 1718), was a Scottish politician who sat in the Parliament of Scotland from 1702 to 1707 and in the British House of Commons from 1707 to 1713.

Douglas was the son of William Douglas of Spynie and his wife Marjorie Menteith, daughter of Patrick Mentieth of Egilsay. He succeeded his father after 1685. On 12 April 1688, he married Janet Scot, widow of Alexander Cruickshanks of Waristoun.

Douglas served as Shire Commissioner for Orkney and Zetland stewartry in the Parliament of Scotland from 1702 to 1707. He was knighted in 1707 and was one of the Scottish MPs co-opted to the first Parliament of Great Britain in 1707. At the 1708 British general election he was returned as Member of Parliament for Orkney and Shetland and his only known vote was in favour of the impeachment of Henry Sacheverell in 1710. He was appointed the Chamberlain of the Bishopric of Orkney in 1710, which brought a salary or pension of £1000 Scots. He was reluctant to stand again, but was promised £200 from the government to cover the cost of attendance at Westminster. At the 1710 British general election, he was returned as a Tory and listed as a 'worthy patriot' who helped to detect the mismanagements of the previous administration. However he never received the promised travel allowance. He declined standing at the 1713 British general election. He was joint lieutenant of Orkney in 1715.

Douglas died in January 1718, having had two sons and three daughters. His wife died after 1718. Egilsay descended via his eldest son, William, to his granddaughter, Janet, who married James Baikie of Tankerness and had a son, Robert.

Parliament of Scotland
Preceded by	Shire Commissioner for Orkney and Zetland stewartry 1702–1707; With: Sir Archibald Stewart	Succeeded by Parliament of Great Britain
New parliament	Member of Parliament for Scotland; 1707–1708	Constituency split
New constituency	Member of Parliament for Orkney and Shetland; 1708–1713	Succeeded by George Douglas
