= Roxburghshire (Parliament of Scotland constituency) =

Constituency of the Old Parliament of Scotland

Before the Acts of Union 1707, the barons of the shire of Roxburgh (also called Teviotdale) elected commissioners to represent them in the unicameral Parliament of Scotland and in the Convention of the Estates. The number of commissioners was increased from two to four in 1690.

From 1708 Roxburghshire was represented by one Member of Parliament in the House of Commons of Great Britain.

== List of shire commissioners ==
- 1617 and 1621: Andrew Riddell of Riddell
- 1628–33, 1646–47, 1650: Sir Walter Riddell of Riddell
- 1639–41: Robert Pringle of Stichell
- 1645, 1648–49, 1659: Sir Andrew Kerr of Greenhead
- 1661–63: Sir Archibald Douglas of Caveria
- 1661–63, 1667 (convention), 1669–74: Sir Gilbert Eliott of Stobs
- 1665 (convention): John Scot of Langshaw
- 1665 (convention), 1667 (convention): Harie McDowd
- 1669–74: Sir Andrew Kerr of Greenhead
- 1678 (convention), 1681–82: Robert Pringle of Stichell
- 1678 (convention), 1681–82: Henry McDougal of McCairston
- 1685–86, 1689 (convention), 1689–93: Patrick Scott of Ancrum (expelled)
- 1685–86, 1702–07: Sir William Kerr of Greenhead
- 1689 (convention), 1689–1693: Sir William Eliott of Stobs (expelled)
- 1693–1702, 1702–07: Sir William Bennett of Grubbet
- 1693–1702: John Scott of Wooll
- 1690–1700: Sir John Riddell of Riddell (died c.1700)
- 1690–98: Sir William Douglas of Cavers, sheriff (died c.1698)
- 1698–1700: Sir James Scott of Galla
- 1700–02, 1702–07: Archibald Douglas, 13th of Cavers, sheriff
- 1702-07 Sir Gilbert Elliot of Minto

== See also ==
- List of constituencies in the Parliament of Scotland at the time of the Union
