= Kerr baronets =

Extinct baronetcy in the Baronetage of the United Kingdom

There have been two Kerr baronetcies.

The Kerr Baronetcy of Greenhead, Roxburgh, was created in the Baronetage of Nova Scotia in 1637 for Andrew Kerr. The first three baronets represented Roxburghshire in the Scottish parliament, and the third was sent as one of the Scottish representatives to the first Parliament of Great Britain in 1707. The baronetcy became dormant on the death of the seventh baronet in 1776.

The Kerr Baronetcy, of Cambridge, Cambridgeshire, was created in the Baronetage of the United Kingdom in 1957 for Hamilton William Kerr, the Conservative Party Member of Parliament for Cambridge. It became extinct on his death in 1974.

== Kerr baronets, of Greenhead (1637) ==
- Sir Andrew Kerr, 1st Baronet (died 1665)
- Sir Andrew Kerr, 2nd Baronet (died c. 1676)
- Sir William Kerr, 3rd Baronet (died 1716)
- Sir William Kerr, 4th Baronet (died 1741)
- Sir Robert Kerr, 5th Baronet (died 1746)
- Sir William Kerr, 6th Baronet (died 1755)
- Sir Robert Kerr, 7th Baronet (died 1776)

== Kerr baronets, of Cambridge (1957) ==
- Sir Hamilton Kerr, 1st Baronet (1903–1974)
