= Archibald Douglas, 13th of Cavers =

Scottish politician

Archibald Douglas, 13th of Cavers was a Scottish politician. In 1701, prior to the Union of Scotland and England, Douglas had been able to return himself as one of Roxburghshire's four Commissioners to the Scottish Parliament. In his electoral capacity, he consistently opposed the Roxburghe interest both in the Scottish and British Parliaments. Repeated successes prompted his son William to remark with pardonable exaggeration in 1712 that "you have it in your hands to make the Member for the county."

He came from an ancient Roxburghshire family with a strong Covenanting tradition. He was the heritable sheriff of Teviotdale, Roxburghshire and sat in the 1st Parliament of Great Britain in 1707–8. He was the Member of Parliament for Dumfries burghs for 1727–34.

His father William Douglas 11th of Cavers had been deprived of the hereditary sheriffdom on account of his opposition to the court, and his mother, Katherine Rigg the reputed 'good Lady Cavers', was imprisoned in Stirling Castle in November 1682. She was only released permanently in December 1684, when, upon being given the choice of conforming or leaving the country, she took up residence in England.

The family's status naturally revived with the Revolution, whereupon the heritable jurisdiction of Roxburghshire was restored. Douglas succeeded his elder brother, William, to the sheriffdom and the estate of Cavers in 1698. He was Receiver-general for Scotland 1705-18 and postmaster-general in 1725.

Archibald Douglas married Anna, daughter of Francis Scott of Gorrenberry.

He died in 1741, the estate of Cavers passing to each of his four sons in succession.

Parliament of Great Britain
Preceded by William Douglas	Member of Parliament for Dumfries Burghs; 1727–1734	Succeeded by Charles Erskine
