= Orkney and Shetland (Parliament of Scotland constituency) =

Constituency of the Old Parliament of Scotland

Before the Acts of Union 1707, the barons of the stewartry of Orkney and lordship of Shetland (formerly spelled Zetland) elected commissioners to represent them in the unicameral Parliament of Scotland and in the Convention of Estates. They were re-annexed to the Crown in 1669.

The last election in 1702 was bitterly contested with the second seat initially going to William Craigie of Gairsay who was forced to withdraw. He said it was under pressure from James Douglas 11th Earl of Morton and his brother. Sir Archibald Stewart of Buray was selected in his place.

After 1708, Orkney and Shetland returned one member to the House of Commons of Great Britain and later to the House of Commons of the United Kingdom.

== List of commissioners ==
- 1661–62: Hugh Craigie of Gairsay (died c.1662)
- 1663, 1669–74: Patrick Blair of Little Blair, sheriff
- 1665 convention: not represented
- 1667 (convention): Arthur Buchanan of Sound
- 1667 (convention): William Douglas of Eglishaw
- 1678 (convention): Captain Andrew Dick
- 1681–82, 1689 (convention), 1689–1701: William Craigie of Gairsay
- 1685–86: Harie Grahame of Breckness
- 1685–86: Charles Murray of Hadden
- 1700: Charles Mitchell, writer in Edinburgh
- 1702–04: Sir Archibald Stewart of Burray
- 1702-07: Alexander Douglas of Eagleshay

== See also ==
- List of constituencies in the Parliament of Scotland at the time of the Union
