= Perthshire (Parliament of Scotland constituency) =

Before the Acts of Union 1707, the barons of the shire of Perth elected commissioners to represent them in the unicameral Parliament of Scotland and in the Convention of the Estates. The number of commissioners was increased from two to four in 1690.

From 1708 Perthshire was represented by one Member of Parliament in the House of Commons of Great Britain.

== List of shire commissioners ==
- 1617-? George Auchinleck, Lord Balmanno
- 1639–41: Sir John Moncreiff of Moncreiff
- 1639–41: Thomas Ruthven of Frieland
- 1643: Patrick Kinnaird of Inchstair
- 1643: George Graeme of Invhbraikle
- 1644–45: Laird of Gleneagles (Haldane)
- 1644–45: Laird of Balhousie (Hay)
- 1645–47: Laird of Frieland (Ruthven)
- 1645–47: Lair of Aldie (Mercer)
- 1648: Laird of Inchmertene (Ogilvie)
- 1648: Laird of Balthayok (Blair)
- 1649–51: Sir Thomas Ruthven
- 1649–50: Sir John Brown
- 1650–51: Laird of Ardblair (Blair)
- 1661–63: Mungo Murray of Garth
- 1661–63: Sir George Kinnaird of Rossie
- 1665 convention, 1667 convention: Sir John Drummond of Burnbank
- 1665 convention, 1667 convention: Sir Thomas Stewart of Gairntellie
- 1669–74, 1678 convention, 1681–82, 1685–86: Lt-Gen. William Drummond of Cromlix
- 1669–70: Sir Mungo Murray of Garth (died c.1670)
- 1672: Sir Gilbert Stewart of Tillineddes (died c.1672)
- 1673–74: Sir William Murray of Ochtertyre
- 1678 convention: John Graham of Fintrie
- 1681–82, 1685: Mungo Haldane of Gleneagles (died 1685)
- 1685–86: Sir John Murray of Drumcairn
- 1689 convention, 1689–93: John Haldane of Gleneagles (expelled 1693)
- 1689 convention, 1689–93: Sir James Ramsay of Bamff (expelled 1693)
- 1690–1702: Sir Colin Campbell of Aberuchill
- 1690–1702: Adam Drummond of Megginch
- 1693–95: Sir Alexander Menzies of that Ilk (died 1695)
- 1693–97: Thomas Hay of Balhousie (ennobled as Viscount Dupplin 1697)
- 1695–1701: Robert Hay of Strowie
- 1698–1701: James Craigie the younger
- 1702: William Oliphant of Gask (died c1702)
- 1702–07: Sir Patrick Murray of Ochtertyre
- 1702-07: Mungo Graham of Gorthie
- 1702–07: John Haldane of Gleneagles
- 1704–07: John Murray of Strowan

== See also ==
- List of constituencies in the Parliament of Scotland at the time of the Union
