= Lanarkshire (Parliament of Scotland constituency) =

Before the Acts of Union 1707, the barons of the shire of Lanark elected commissioners to represent them in the unicameral Parliament of Scotland and in the Convention of the Estates. The number of commissioners was increased from two to four in 1690.

From 1708 Lanarkshire was represented by one Member of Parliament in the House of Commons of Great Britain.

== List of shire commissioners ==
Parliament or Convention	Commissioners			
Parliament; 12–13 October 1612	Sir William Baillie of Lamington		Sir John Hamilton of Lettrick	
Convention; 7 March 1617	Maxwell of Calderwood		Sir John Hamilton of Lettrick	
Parliament; 27 May–28 June 1617	Sir John Hamilton of Lettrick		Maxwell of Calderwood	
Convention; 25–26 January 1621	none			
Parliament; 1 June–4 August 1621	Maxwell of Calderwood		Sir John Hamilton of Lettrick	
Convention; 27 October–2 November 1625	Hamilton of Lettrick		Hamilton of Goslingtoun	
Parliament; 15 September 1628 – 28 June 1633	Sir James Lockhart, yr of Lee		Gavin Hamilton of Raploch	
Convention; 28 July–7 August 1630	Gavin Hamilton of Raploch		Sir James Lockhart, yr of Lee	
Parliament; 15 May 1639 – 17 November 1641				
Convention; 22 June 1643 – 3 June 1644
Parliament; 4 June 1644 – 27 March 1647
Parliament; 2 March 1648 – 6 June 1651
During the Commonwealth of England, Scotland and Ireland, the sheriffdom of Lanark was represented by one Member of Parliament in the Protectorate Parliament at Westminster.
Parliament; 3 September 1654 – 22 January 1655	William Lockhart			
Parliament; 17 September 1656 – 4 February 1658	William Lockhart			
Parliament; 27 January–22 April 1659	William Lockhart			
After the Restoration, the Parliament of Scotland was again summoned to meet in Edinburgh.
Parliament; 1 January 1661 – 9 October 1663	Sir James Lockhart of Lee		Sir Robert Hamilton, 1st Baronet of Silvertonhill	
Convention; 2–4 August 1665	Sir James Lockhart of Lee		Gavin Hamilton of Roploch	
Convention; 9–23 January 1667	Sir James Lockhart of Lee		Gavin Hamilton of Roploch	
Parliament; 19 October 1669 – 3 March 1674	Sir James Lockhart of Lee		John Harper of Cambusnethan	
Parliament; 19 October 1669 – 3 March 1674	Sir William Lockhart (from 1672)		John Harper of Cambusnethan	
Convention; 26 June–11 July 1678	Cromwell Lockhart of Lee		Maj. Sir Robert Hamilton, 2nd Baronet of Silvertonhill	
Parliament; 28 July 1681 – 1 March 1682	Cromwell Lockhart of Lee		Sir George Lockhart of Braidwood	
Parliament; 23 April 1685 – 15 June 1686	Sir George Lockhart, now of Carnwath		Cromwell Lockhart of Lee	
Convention; 14 March–24 May 1689	William Baillie of Lamington		Sir Daniel Carmichael of Maudslie	
Parliament; 5 June 1689 – 30 June 1702	William Baillie of Lamington		Sir Daniel Carmichael of Maudslie	
Parliament; 5 June 1689 – 30 June 1702	By Act of Parliament 14 June 1690, the shire of Lanark was allocated two additional Commissioners.			
Parliament; 5 June 1689 – 30 June 1702	William Baillie of Lamington	Sir Daniel Carmichael of Maudslie	Sir William Denham of Westshield	James Hamilton of Aikenhead
Parliament; 5 June 1689 – 30 June 1702	William Baillie of Lamington	Sir John Lockhart of Castlehill (from 1693)	Sir William Denham of Westshield	James Hamilton of Aikenhead
Parliament; 5 June 1689 – 30 June 1702	William Baillie of Lamington	Richard Lockhart of Lee (from 1695)	Sir William Denham of Westshield	James Hamilton of Aikenhead
Parliament; 5 June 1689 – 30 June 1702	William Baillie of Lamington	Sir William Stuart of Castlemilk (from 1696)	Sir William Denham of Westshield	James Hamilton of Aikenhead
Parliament; 12 November 1702 – 25 March 1707	William Baillie of Lamington	George Baillie of Jerviswood	John Sinclair, yr of Stevenson	James Hamilton of Aikenhead

== See also ==
- List of constituencies in the Parliament of Scotland at the time of the Union
