= Berwickshire (Parliament of Scotland constituency) =

Before the Act of Union 1707, the barons of the sheriffdom or shire of Berwick (also called the Merse) elected commissioners to represent them in the unicameral Parliament of Scotland and in the Convention of Estates. The number of commissioners was increased from two to four in 1690.

During the Commonwealth of England, Scotland and Ireland the sheriffdom was represented by one Member of Parliament in the Protectorate Parliament at Westminster. After 1708, Berwickshire returned one member to the House of Commons of Great Britain and later to the House of Commons of the United Kingdom.

== List of shire commissioners ==
- 1612: William Cockburn of Langton
- 1612, 1621: Robert Swinton of that Ilk
- 1625: James Cockburn of Ryslaw
- 1630: Sir Patrick Hume of Polwarth
- 1639, 1640–41, 1645–46, 1649–50: Sir David Home of Wedderburn
- 1640–41: Sir William Cockburn of Langton
- 1644–45: Sir Alexander Swinton of that Ilk
- 1649, 1650, 1654–55, 1656–58, 1659–60: John Swinton of that Ilk
- 1661–63: Colonel John Hume of Plandergaist
- 1661–63: Sir Robert Douglas of Blaikerstone
- 1665 convention, 1667 convention, 1669–74: Sir Robert Sinclair of Longformacus
- 1665 convention, 1667 convention, 1669–74, 1689 convention, 1689–90: Sir Patrick Hume of Polwarth (ennobled 1690)
- 1678 convention: Sir Roger Hog of Harcarse
- 1678 (convention), 1685–86, 1689 (convention), 1689–1702: Sir Archibald Cockburn of Langton
- 1681–82: John Edgar of Wedderlie
- 1690–1706: Sir John Home of Blackadder
- 1690–1702, 1702–07: Sir John Swinton of that Ilk
- 1702–07: Sir Robert Sinclair of Longformacus
- 1702-07: Sir Patrick Home of Rentoun
- 1706–07: Sir Alexander Campbell of Cesnock

== See also ==
- List of constituencies in the Parliament of Scotland at the time of the Union
