= Commissioner (Scottish Parliament) =

Member of the pre-union Parliament of the Kingdom of Scotland

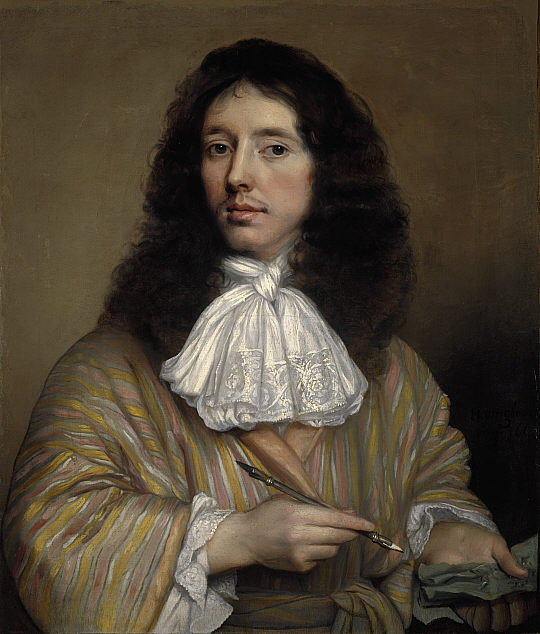
The architect William Bruce sat in the Scottish Parliament as shire commissioner for Fife (1669-74), and for Kinross (1681-2).

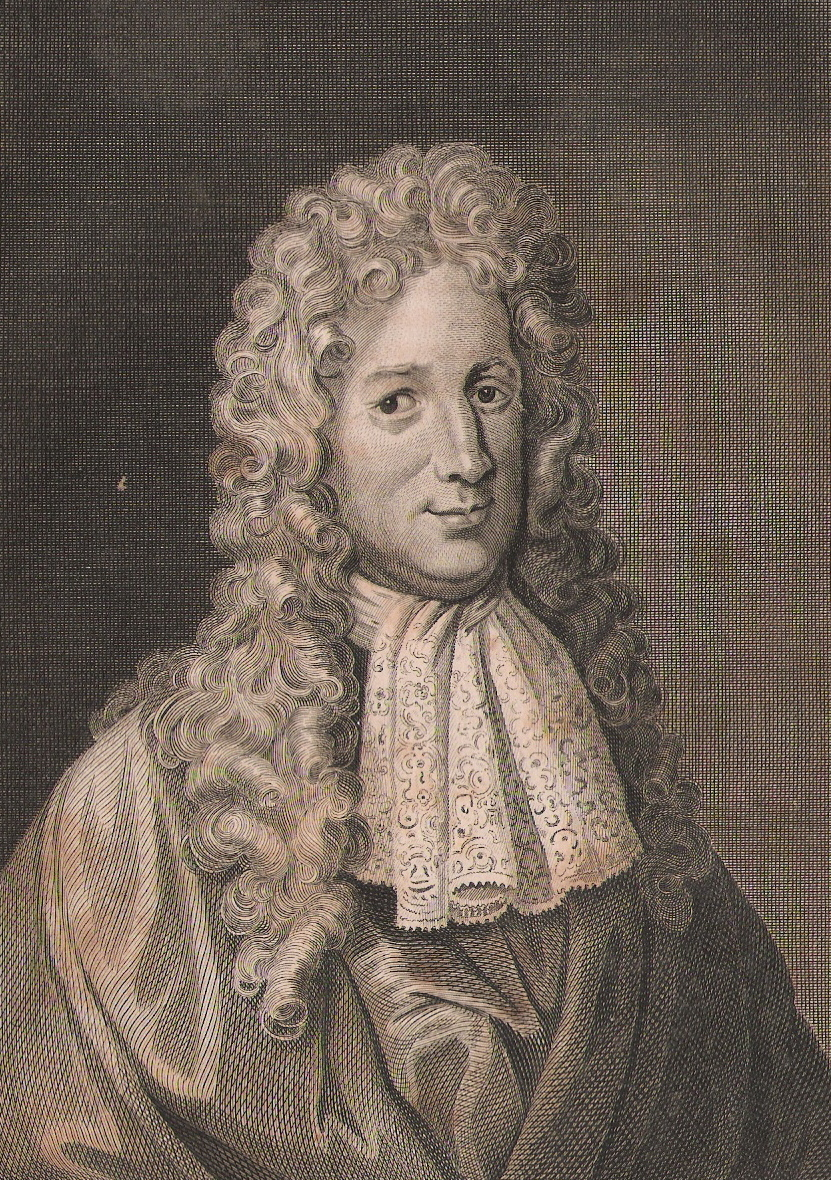
Fletcher of Saltoun was elected in 1678 as a commissioner for Haddingtonshire.

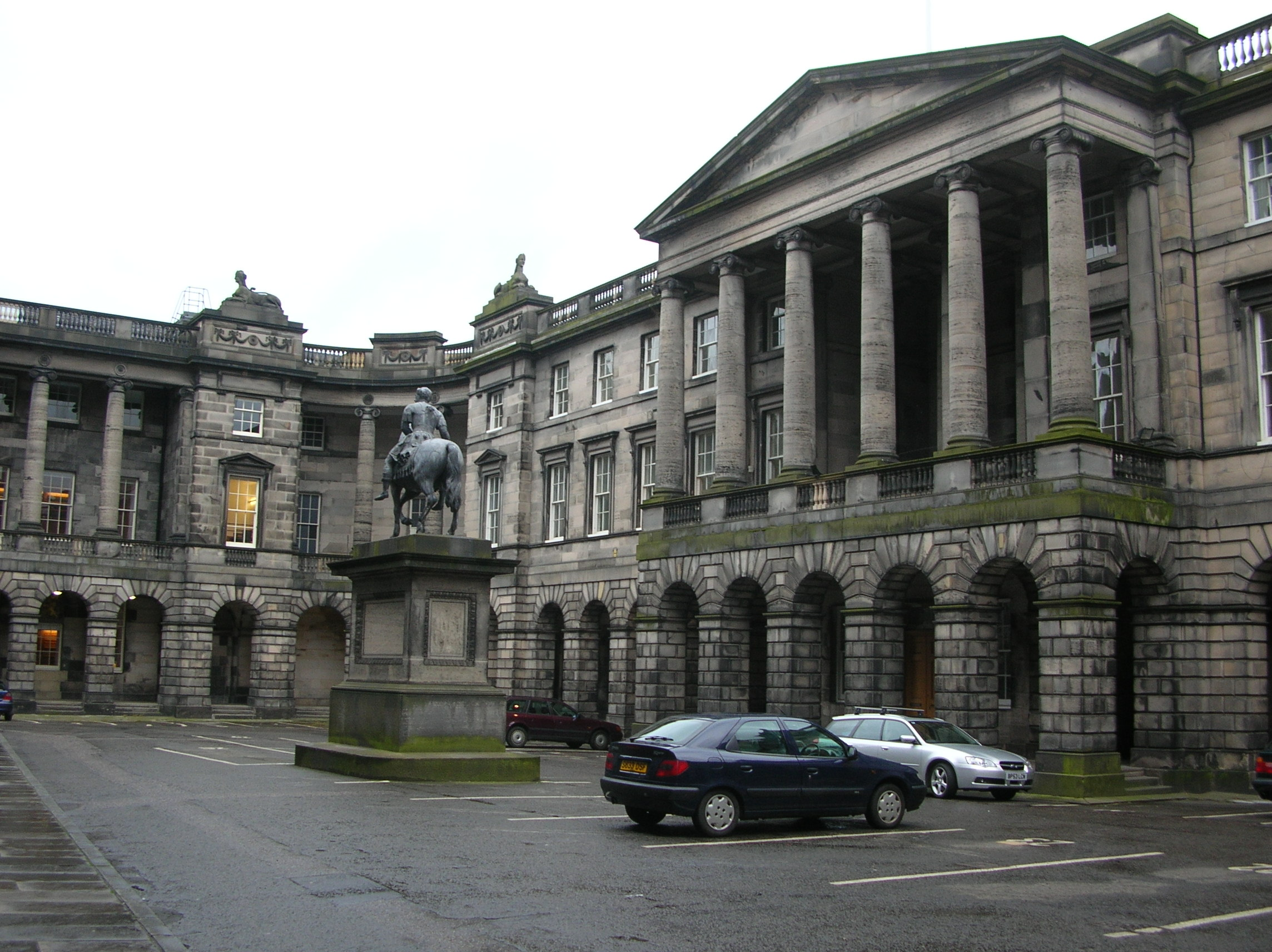
Parliament House, Edinburgh

A commissioner was a legislator appointed or elected to represent a royal burgh or shire in the Parliament of Scotland and the associated Convention of the Estates. Member of Parliament (MP) and Deputy are equivalent terms in other countries.

The Scottish Parliament (also known as the Three Estates) and the Convention of the Estates were unicameral legislatures, so commissioners sat alongside prelates (the first estate) and members of the nobility (the second estate).

== Burgh commissioners ==
Burgh commissioners were the third estate, and were the longest-established and most powerful group of commissioners to parliament. They first attended in 1326.

Burgh commissioners often acted and lobbied collectively, assisted by the fact that the Convention of Royal Burghs often met in association with parliamentary sessions.

== Shire commissioners ==
From the 16th century, the second estate of the nobility was reorganised by the selection of shire commissioners from the lower nobility: this has been argued to have created a fourth estate.

Each shire, stewartry or constabulary sent two shire commissioners to parliament, with the exception of the small shires of Clackmannan and Kinross which only sent one. However, each shire had only one vote, meaning that the two commissioners had to cooperate and compromise with each other. They appear to have possessed plena potestas, and were not necessarily required to consult their electorates.

Early shire commissioners were lesser barons, with the earliest recorded shire election being on 31 January 1596, in Aberdeenshire.

The powers of the shire commissioners greatly expanded over time, especially with the long-term decline in power of the prelates. In 1640, the Covenanters abolished the episcopates, and each shire commissioner was given their own vote. This arrangement continued upon the Restoration of the Episcopates in 1662.

== See also ==
- Lord High Commissioner to the Parliament of Scotland, the monarch's personal commissioner to parliament, after the 1603 Union of the Crowns, when the Scottish monarch resided in England
- List of constituencies in the Parliament of Scotland at the time of the Union
- Member of the Scottish Parliament (member of the devolved legislature created in 1999)

Other similar terms:

- Member of Parliament
- Deputy (legislator)
- Member of Congress
