= Campbell baronets of Auchinbreck (1628) =

Escutcheon of the Campbell baronets of Auchinbreck

The Campbell baronetcy, of Auchinbreck in the County of Argyll, was created in the Baronetage of Nova Scotia on 24 January 1628 for Sir Dugald Campbell. He was a descendant of Duncan Campbell of Kilmichael, younger son of Duncan Campbell, 1st Lord Campbell, ancestor of the Dukes of Argyll. The fifth Baronet was one of the Scottish representatives to the 1st Parliament of Great Britain.

== Campbell baronets, of Auchinbreck (1628) ==
- Sir Dugald Campbell, 1st Baronet (c. 1570–1641)
- Sir Duncan Campbell, 2nd Baronet (died 1645)
- Sir Dugald Campbell, 3rd Baronet (died c. 1661)
- Sir Duncan Campbell, 4th Baronet (died c. 1700)
- Sir James Campbell, 5th Baronet (c. 1679–1756)
- Sir James Campbell, 6th Baronet (died 1814)
- (unclear) Sir Jean Baptiste Guillaume Édouard Charles Campbell, 7th Baronet (1769–1847). Foster, while identifying an heir of the 6th Baronet, omits details of a 7th Baronet having actually taken the title. Cockayne, writing later, identifies a hiatus and period of dormancy after the death of the 6th Baronet, stating that the 7th Baronet assumed the title.
- Sir John Eyton Campbell, 8th Baronet (1809–1853)
- Sir Louis Henry Dugald Campbell, 9th Baronet (1844–1875)
- Sir Norman Montgomery Abercrombie Campbell, 10th Baronet (1846–1901)
- Sir Charles Ralph Campbell, 11th Baronet (1850–1919)
- Sir Charles Ralph Campbell, 12th Baronet (1881–1948)
- Sir Norman Dugald Ferrier Campbell, 13th Baronet (1883–1968)
- Sir Louis Hamilton Campbell, 14th Baronet (1885–1970)
- Sir Robin Auchinbreck Campbell, 15th Baronet (1922–2016)
- Sir Louis Auchinbreck Campbell, 16th Baronet (born 1953)

== See also ==
- Campbell of Auchinbreck
