= John Campbell of Mamore =

Scottish Whig politician

The Hon. John Campbell (c. 1660 – 9 April 1729), of Mamore, was a Scottish Whig politician who sat in the Parliament of Scotland from 1700 to 1707 and in the British House of Commons between 1707 and 1727.

== Early life ==
Campbell was the second son of Archibald Campbell, 9th Earl of Argyll, and his wife Lady Mary Stewart, daughter of the 4th Earl of Moray. He was educated at Glasgow in 1676. Being party to his father's unsuccessful rising against James II, he suffered forfeiture and banishment and was always in financial difficulties. He served as Captain of foot in the Earl of Argyll's regiment from 1689 until after 1690. In 1692 he married Elizabeth Elphinstone, the daughter of John, 8th Lord Elphinstone.

== Career ==
The Isle of Islay

Campbell was Commissioner for Argyllshire in the Parliament of Scotland from 1700 to 1707 and surveyor of the King's works in Scotland from 1705 to 1717. He supported the Union of Scotland and England and after the Union in 1707 was considered sound enough to represent Scotland in the British Parliament that year. At the 1708 general election, he was returned unopposed as member of parliament (MP) for Dunbartonshire. He was returned unopposed again in 1710 when he was classed as a Whig. He made little impression in Parliament, being often absent. He was returned unopposed again at the 1713 general election. He was returned again at the 1715 general election and voted for the septennial bill in 1716. He went into opposition with the Duke of Argyll and lost his official post in 1717.

In 1719 the Duke of Argyll returned to office and Campbell changed his support to the government. In 1722 there was a contest at Dumbarton in which he was defeated in the poll. He was returned on petition on 23 January 1725 and held the seat until the 1727 general election. He then resigned his seat in favour of his son John.

In 1725 a mob besieged his Glasgow mansion (Shawfield built in 1711 by Colen Campbell, now where Glassford Street stands) due to his involvement in the new Malt Tax in Scotland which impacted heavily on brewing profits and the cost of beer. The following day, troops were brought from Dumbarton Castle and upon firing on the continuing riot nine were killed and 17 wounded. 19 persons were captured and put on trial in Edinburgh. In addition Provost John Stark and most of his Deacons were arrested and charged with neglect. The Town Council were obliged to pay Campbell £9000 in compensation and when added to the money he received from the sale of the Glasgow mansion he purchased the entire Isle of Islay.

== Death and legacy ==
Campbell died on 9 April 1729. He and his wife had issue:

- John Campbell, 4th Duke of Argyll
- Charles Campbell of Auchnacreive, MP for Argyllshire (MP)
- Neil Campbell heir to Shawfield and Islay
- William Campbell (MP)
- Mary Campbell, married James Primrose, 2nd Earl of Rosebery
- Anne Campbell, married Archibald Edmonstone of Duntreath, had issue:
  - Sir Archibald Edmonstone, 1st Baronet
- Isabella Campbell, married Captain William Montgomery of Rosemount
- Jean Campbell, married Captain John Campbell of Carrick
- Primrose Cambell, married Simon Fraser, 11th Lord Lovat
- Elizabeth Campbell

== Trivia ==
Shawfield mansion was bought by the Old Ship Bank in 1776 and demolished in 1826 to create a new bank.

Parliament of Scotland
Preceded by Sir Duncan Campbell; Sir John Campbell; Sir Colin Campbell	Shire Commissioner for Argyll; 1700–1707; With: Sir John Campbell 1700–1702; Sir Colin Campbell 1700–1702; Sir James Campbell 1702–1707; Sir James Campbell 1702–1707	Succeeded by Parliament of Great Britain
Parliament of Great Britain
Preceded by Parliament of Scotland	Member of Parliament for Scotland; 1707–1708; With: 44 others	Succeeded by Sir James Campbell (as MP for Argyllshire)
New constituency	Member of Parliament for Dunbartonshire; 1708–1722	Succeeded by Mungo Haldane
Preceded by Mungo Haldane	Member of Parliament for Dunbartonshire; 1725–1727	Succeeded by John Campbell
