= Argyllshire (Parliament of Scotland constituency) =

Before the Acts of Union 1707, the barons of the shire or sheriffdom of Argyll elected commissioners to represent them in the unicameral Parliament of Scotland and in the Convention of the Estates. The number of commissioners was increased from two to three in 1693.

From 1708 Argyllshire was represented by one Member of Parliament in the House of Commons of Great Britain.

== List of shire commissioners ==
- 1593: Sir Duncan Campbell of Glenorchy
- 1628–33 : Sir Duncan Campbell of Auchinbreck
- 1639–41, : Sir Robert Campbell of Glenorchy
- 1639–41: Sir Duncan Campbell
- 1643–44: Sir Robert Campbell of Glenorchy
- 1643: Sir Duncan Campbell
- 1644–49: Sir Robert Campbell of Glenorchy
- 1646–49: James Campbell of Ardkinglass
- 1649: Sir Dugald Campbell of Auchinbreck
- 1661–63: Sir John Campbell of Glenorchy
- 1661–63: John Campbell of Ardchattane
- 1665 convention, 1667 convention: no representatives
- 1669–74: Sir John Campbell of Glenorchy
- 1669–74: Sir John Campbell of Carrick
- 1678 convention: Sir John Campbell of Carrick
- 1678 convention: Alexander Campbell of Glenstrae
- 1681–82: Sir John Campbell of Carrick
- 1681–82: Sir John Campbell of Sockoth
- 1685–86: Lauchlan Maclean of Brolas, baillie
- 1685–86: Archibald Lamont of Inneryne
- 1689 convention, 1689–1702: Sir John Campbell of Carrick
- 1689 convention, 1689–1700: Sir Duncan Campbell of Auchinbreck
- 1693–1702: Sir Colin Campbell of Ardkinglass
- 1702–07: John Campbell of Mamore
- 1702–07: Sir James Campbell of Auchinbreck
- 1702–07: James Campbell of Ardkinglass

== See also ==
- List of constituencies in the Parliament of Scotland at the time of the Union
