= Campbell of Auchinbreck =

The Campbell of Auchinbreck (also spelled Auchenbreck) family was founded by Duncan Campbell in Glassary, Argyll, Scotland. He was the son of Lord Duncan Campbell, first Lord Campbell of the Clan Campbell, by his second wife Margaret, daughter of Sir John Stewart of Blackhall, the illegitimate son of King Robert III of Scotland. The family of the Lords Campbell later became Dukes of Argyll, and remain chiefs of Clan Campbell. Duncan Campbell, as a grandson of King Robert III, received a considerable estate confirmed by royal charter dated 19 June 1452. The family remained at their estate of Auchinbreck, from which they took their title, until 1641. The Campbells of Auchinbreck were commissioned to provide military training and were used by the Earls of Argyll as military support. In 1628 the then head of the family of Campbells in Auchinbreck received a baronetcy, which included a grant of North American land in Nova Scotia.

Arms of the Baronet of Auchinbreck

== Campbell of Auchinbreck Arms ==
The arms of Campbell, won following the achievements of the Duke of Argyll, chief of the clan (Mac Cailein mor), used gyronny of eight Or and Sable as their variation of the field. All Campbell arms use the gyronny, which is one of the sub-ordinaries produced by dividing the shield per pale per fess, per bend and per bend sinister into eight triangular portions. The Campbells of Auchinbreck are differenced by the addition of a bordure, and are gyronny of eight Or and Sable a bordure chequy Ermine and Vert. The crest is a dexter hand Proper, holding a spur Or.

== Chief stronghold ==
Sir Dugald Campbell of Auchinbreck had his chief stronghold at Auchenbreck Castle of which fragments remain at Auchnabreck Farm, on the Cowal peninsula. This had passed to his great-great-grandfather in around 1500. and is traditionally regarded as the remains of Auchinbreck Castle, the residence of Sir D. Campbell, whose initials and crest dated 1610 appear on a stone in the present nearby, Kilmodan Church wall, in Glendaruel. The only visible remains are a wall in the centre of the garden and the slope of the North side, showing where the castle once stood. The farmhouse and the mill of Auchenbreck were built from material taken from the castle. In 1641, Sir Dugald Campbell, 3rd Baronet of Auchinbreck, died while attempting to put out a catastrophic fire at the castle. His son, Sir Duncan Campbell decided to move the family to Carnassarie Castle which Sir Dugald had purchased from the Earl of Argyll.

== Major military engagements ==
The Auchinbrecks were hereditary Lieutenant Colonels in the 17th and 18th centuries when military rank was often inherited. It was the Auchinbreck hereditary right and responsibility to raise an army for the Duke of Argyll who would then lead the soldiers into battle in engagements such as:

- Battle of Flodden (1513)
- Battle of Langside (1568)
- Battle of Glenlivet (1594)
- Irish Rebellion of 1641
- Scotland in the Wars of the Three Kingdoms (1644)
- Battle of Inverlochy (1645)
- Massacre of Clan Lamont at Dunoon (1646)
- Monmouth Rebellion (1685)

== Lineage ==
- Sir Duncan Campbell, of Lochow; first Lord Campbell of Argyll (1401–1462). Son of Sir Colin Campbell. He was called "Donnachadh an Aidh" meaning "Duncan the fortunate". Sir Duncan married secondly, Margaret Stewart daughter of Sir John Stewart of Ardgellan who was King Robert's natural son and gave birth to Duncan Campbell from which the House of Auchinbreck descends.
- Sir Duncan Campbell, 1st Lord Campbell of Auchinbreck & Kilmichael (About 1430–1462)
- Sir Dugald Campbell, 2nd Lord of Auchinbreck and Kilmichael(About 1457–1497)
- Sir Archibald Campbell, 3rd Lord of Auchinbreck(about 1480–1546)
- Sir Duncan Campbell, 4th Lord of Auchinbreck (aft 1540–1594)
- Sir Dugald Campbell, 1st Baronet of Auchinbreck 5th Lord of Auchinbreck (1576–1641)
- Sir Duncan Campbell of Auchinbreck, 2nd Baronet and 6th Lord Auchinbreck(1597–1645)
- Sir Dugald Campbell, 3rd Baronet of Auchinbreck (Abt 1629–1662).
- Sir Duncan Campbell, 4th Baronet of Auchinbreck( ?–1700)
- Sir James Campbell, 5th Baronet of Auchinbreck (1679–1756)
- Sir James Campbell, 6th Baronet of Auchinbreck
- Sir Dugald Campbell, 7th Baronet of Auchinbreck
- Sir John Campbell, 8th Baronet of Auchinbreck
- Sir Louis Campbell, 9th Baronet of Auchinbreck
- Sir Norman Campbell, 10th Baronet of Auchinbreck
- Sir Charles Campbell, 11th Baronet of Auchinbreck
- Sir Charles Campbell, 12th Baronet of Auchinbreck
- Sir Norman Campbell, 13th Baronet of Auchinbreck
- Sir Louis Campbell, 14th Baronet of Auchinbreck
- Sir Robin Auchinbreck Campbell of Auchinbreck is the 15th baronet Campbell of Auchinbreck

== Baronetage of Nova Scotia (1625–1706) ==
On 10 September 1621 King James I of England signed a grant in favor of Sir William Alexander, which covered all of the lands 'between our Colonies of New England and Newfoundland, to be known as New Scotland'. Known by its Latin name Nova Scotia, the territory was larger than Great Britain and France combined. On 18 October 1624 the King announced his intention to create a new order of baronets comprising Scottish 'knights and gentlemen of chiefs respect for the birth, place, or fortunes', King James I died on 27 March 1625 but his heir, King Charles I, lost no time in implementing his father's plan. By the end of 1625 the first 22 baronets of Nova Scotia were created and, as inducements to settle his new colony of Nova Scotia, Sir William offered tracts of land totaling 11,520 acres to all such 'principal knights & esquires as will be pleased to be undertakers of the said plantations and who will promise to set forth 6 men, artificers or laborers, sufficiently armed, appareled & victual led for 2 years.' Baronets could receive their letters patent in Edinburgh rather than London, and an area of Edinburgh Castle was declared Nova Scotian territory for this purpose. In return, applicants had to pay Sir William 1000 marks for his 'past charges in discovery of the said country.'

Sir Dugald Campbell, 1st Baronet of Auchinbreck and 5th Laird of Auchinbreck (1576–1641), was the son of Sir Duncan and Mary MacLeod and heir to his estate before 1599. He raided Bute in 1602. He was knighted by James I of England in 1617 and created Baronet of Nova Scotia in 1628. MacPhail wrote (p. 65): "…(Dugald) was by King’s Charter 1st created Knight Baronet of Nova Scotia... (He received a charter wherein there are many privileges) "...dated at Whitehall, 12 January 1628. He seems to have been knighted at an earlier date." Dugald married three times. His second wife, Mary Erskine, was the daughter of Alexander Erskine of Gogar and sister to Sir Thomas Erskine.

== Royal Commissions and Honours to Auchinbreck ==
Sir Duncan Campbell, 1st Lord Campbell of Auchinbreck & Kilmichael, was granted considerable estates which were confirmed to him by royal charter on 6 July 1452.

Sir Duncan Campbell, 4th Lord of Auchinbreck (aft 1540–1594) was appointed Captain Of Sween Castle in 1546. His lands were chartered in 1546. The Castle was built in the 12th century, and had been in and out of Campbell hands at various times. One of the earliest stone castles in western Scotland, it stands at the mouth of Loch Sween and is set upon a low rocky point beside a sand beach facing south. The low ground between the site and the hills leaves the castle highly visible to those further up Loch Sween. There is a natural anchorage nearby. When he was killed at the Battle of Glenlivet in 1594, his son Duncan inherited the castle, which was then attacked and burned in 1644 by Alasdair Mac Colla and has been in ruins ever since. Today, the castle is owned by the Department of the Environment and is open to the public.

King James I of England (King James VI of Scotland) made the following commission to Sir Dugall Campbell of Auchinbreck in 1615.

"All the lieges within the sheriffdoms of Argyle and Tarbert, were charged, by proclamation, to join the forces formerly appointed to be in readiness under Campbell of Auchin breck. That baron being liberated from prison, received a commission as Lieutenant against the Clan Donald, with the chief command over the other gentlemen employed; but the duration of his commission was limited to the arrival of Argyle, which was expected by the 6th of August. Angus Oig Macdonald, and several of his followers, were tried and condemned for high treason on the 3d of July, and executed on the 8th of that month. Their fate excited great commiseration, which was mingled with a feeling of indignation, that no steps were taken to punish the villainous conduct of the Chancellor's emissary, (Graham)."

Sir Dugald Campbell of Auchinbreck, who was knighted by King James 1, and received a charter under the great seal:

"domino Dugaldo Campbell de Auchinbreck, militi terrarum de Schalmus, Halfstouk, Clansbarok, Bellicraig, &c., dated anno 1617."

Dugald was a man of honor and integrity, and sincerely attached to the interests of the royal family. King Charles I created him a Baronet or Knight of Nova Scotia, by his royal patent to him and his heir-male, dated 31 March 1628. He afterwards received two charters under the great seal in 1629 and 1630:

"domino Dugaldo Campbell de Auchinbreck, militi baronetto, terrarum, ecclesiasticarum de Kilcherran, Kilinan, Kilculmemel, &c.,."

Sir Duncan Campbell of Auchinbreck, 2nd Baronet and 6th Lord Auchinbreck(1597–1645), held the office of member of parliament for Argyllshire Scotland between 1639 and 1641. He was commander of the Argyll's troops in Ireland 1641, taking Dunluce Castle, County Antrim. He held the office of Governor of Rathlin Island then was appointed member of parliament for Argyllshire Scotland in 1643. On 2 February 1645, he led Argyll's troops at the Battle of Inverlochy where he was taken prisoner and murdered.

Sir Dugald Campbell, 3rd Baronet of Auchinbreck (Abt 1629–1662), was granted 10,000 marks in recognition of his father's services and compensation for the destruction of his lands. He commanded his father's regiment in Ireland, but resigned his command, and declared for the King. He succeeded to the title of 3rd Baronet Campbell, of Auchinbreck N.S., in 1645, then held the office of member of parliament for Argyllshire Scotland in 1649. He did not marry and had no children. Following the 9th Earl of Argyll's failed uprising in support of the Monmouth Rebellion, against James VII in 1685, the castle was blown up by Royalist forces.

== Breaking Argyll's branches ==
Sir Duncan Campbell, 4th Baronet of Auchinbreck( ?–1700), was the son of Archibald Campbell of Knockamillie and Margaret Campbell. He married Lady Henrietta Lindsay, daughter of Alexander Lindsay, 1st Earl of Balcarres and Lady Anne Mackenzie, circa 28 February 1679–80 and died circa 1700. He succeeded to the title of 4th Baronet Campbell, of Auchinbreck [N.S., 1628] in around 1662 then in 1686 his title and estates were forfeited and the latter given to the 1st Earl of Melfort. He held the office of member of parliament for Argyllshire Scotland between 1689 and 1698, but he resigned his seat and turned Roman Catholic. In 1690 his forfeiture was rescinded.

In August 1684, the heritors of North Knapdale were required to give bonds to the Marquis that they would "not recept supplie or assist in any manner of way Archibald Earle of Argyll or any other declarit fugitive or trator or intercommoned person." Bonds were taken from:

  - Donald Campbell of Oib
  - Duncan Campbell of Largnanshen
  - Sir Duncan Campbell of Auchnabreck
  - Archibald Campbell of Danna
  - Duncan Campbell of Blarintibert
  - John MacNeill of Airchonnan
  - John McIlvernock of Oib
  - Donald McCavish of Dunardarie (Donald MacTavish)
  - John Campbell of Wlva

Charging these lieges at the King's instance and the imposition of bonds without authority of parliament upset the heritors and was among the causes of discontent that later caused them to rebel. In the spring of 1625, matters came to a head. On 2 May, Argyll sailed from Holland with three ships to invade Scotland. Mr. Charles Campbell, son of the Earl met Sir Duncan Campbell of Auchinbreck, whereupon they garrisoned Carnassarie Castle. Eventually more than 140 men from Knapdale joined the Earl. Of these 17 were Campbells, seven were MacTavishes, seven were Campbells, one or two were MacKellers, another seven were Campbells and 13 were MacIlvernocks. Carnassarie was defended by Colin Campbell of Blarintibbert, Duncan Campbell, his son, and Archibald Campbell in Danna and besieged by the MacLeans, MacNeill of Gallachoille and MacLachlan of Craigentyrve. The garrison and the besiegers were therefore well known to one another. Despite them being neighbours, Dugald MacTavish fiar of Dunardary was executed within sight of the garrison. The Campbells, hearing that the Earl had been taken, surrendered the castle to Captain MacKenzie and others who had the authority of the Lord Marquis of Atholl to receive it. Among the sufferers in Knapdale was Marie Campbell, widow of John MacTavish of Dunardary, 12th chief of Clan MacTavish, whose son Dugald had been hanged at Carnassarie. In January the following year, (1685–1686) the Government indicted:

  - Sir Duncan Campbell of Auchinbreck
  - Campbell of Knap
  - Mr. Alexander Campbell, Advocate
  - Campbell of Kilberry, younger
  - Archibald McIlvernock of Oak
  - Dugald McCavish of Dunardarie

In 1690 an Act of Parliament rescinded all fines and forfeitures dating to 1665 whose beneficiaries included Earl of Argyll, Sir Duncan Campbell of Auchenbreck, the deceased Dugald M'Avish of Dinardrie and others. However, the consequences of the 1685 rebellion could not be remedied by an Act of Parliament five years later. Auchinbreck and his heritors were ruined. His money went in payment of Argyll's troops and this was never recovered. Along with others, he suffered destruction of property, plundering of goods, loss of cattle and sheep, deprivation of rent for four years and the expense of living abroad. When he returned, it was to tenants who were themselves robbed and impoverished. On 27 August 1691, the Government gave the chiefs an opportunity to take an oath of allegiance, after which all treasons would be pardoned and the chiefs restored to their estates. The danger of invasion in the Jacobite interest still continued, and a list of the fencible men in Knapdale, between sixteen and sixty, was drawn up on 26 May 1692. A number of the MacTavishes in Dunardary left North Knapdale about 1718 and settled in the Fraser country of Stratherrick. Under the leadership of Duncan Campbell of Kilduskland and Dugald MacTavish of Dunardry "a considerable number of people" sailed from North Knapdale in July 1739. In November 1741, word was received that the adventurers had settled at Cape Fear in North Carolina and expected "a greater number of the poorer sort to follow." The upheaval of the Forty Five Rebellion followed thirty years later.

Sir James Campbell, 5th Baronet of Auchinbreck (1679–1756) was the son of Sir Duncan Campbell of Auchinbreck, 4th Bt. and Lady Henrietta Lindsay. He married, firstly, Janet MacLeod, daughter of Ian 'Breac' Macleod of Macleod, 18th Chief and Florence Macdonald. His second wife Susan Campbell was the daughter of Sir Archibald Campbell of Calder. He married, thirdly, Margaret Campbell, daughter of an unknown Campbell of Carradale and died on 14 October 1756 at Lochgair, Argyllshire, Scotland. He held the office of member of parliament Scotland between 1702 and 1707 and member of parliament from 1707 to 1708. Thirty years later came the upheaval of the Forty Five Rebellion. Less wise than in 1715, the chief heritor of North Knapdale, Sir James Campbell of Auchinbreck had been "in correspondence with the Pretender, and in 1741 had been one of the sept seigneurs ecossais ("seven Scottish lords") who signed an assurance to Cardinal Fleury that Scotland would rise in support of a Franco-Jacobite invasion. Dugald MacTavish the younger of Dunardry conspired with Auchinbreck and treasonable correspondence existed between the two men."

In 1689 a branch broke from the Auchinbreck tree. While it is true that in the 1700s James Campbell, Baronet of Auchinbreck was a Jacobite there was a substantial portion of the family that fought against the Jacobite cause and continued to fight for "The Covenanters." William Campbell, son of another William Campbell, who was in turn the son of Sir Duncan Campbell, 2nd Baronet of Auchinbreck, fought at the Siege of Derry. In that battle he adopted the rank of lieutenant colonel and with a dedicated leadership group lead a Protestant force and tied up King James's Jacobite army long enough to ensure his eventual defeat at the hands of William of Orange.

=== Collapse of the Auchinbreck family ===
The collapse of the Auchinbrecks could not be averted indefinitely, and judicial bankruptcy overtook the family in 1762. As they had been one of the main pillars on which the fabric of society rested, removal of such an integral support weakened the whole, resulting in the disappearance of many smaller houses. In 1785, Lachlan MacTavish of Dunardry, was in financial straits and was compelled to sell. While it is true that the same economic difficulties, which had embarrassed the Auchinbrecks, worked against these smaller proprietors, there is also no doubt but that all these estates had borrowed from Auchinbreck on their own security, and when the crash came, they did not have the money to repay their debts.
