= Glasgow Rutherglen =

Glasgow Rutherglen may mean or refer to:

- Glasgow Rutherglen (UK Parliament constituency)
- Glasgow Rutherglen (Scottish Parliament constituency)

== See also ==
- Rutherglen (Scottish Parliament constituency)
- Rutherglen (Parliament of Scotland constituency)
