= Cairndow =

Hamlet in Argyll and Bute, Scotland

Coordinates: 56.254773°N 4.9379082°W

Cairndow: Scottish Gaelic: An Càrn Dubh
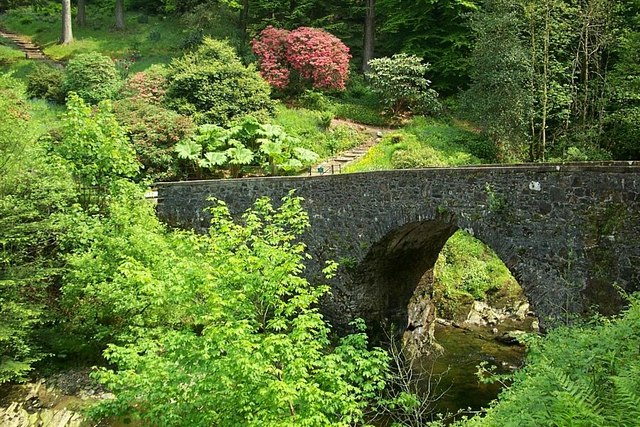
- Ardkinglas Gardens, near Cairndow.

- Location within Argyll and Bute
- OS grid reference: NN 18100 10800
  - Edinburgh: 70 mi (110 km)
  - London: 382 mi (615 km)
- Council area: Argyll and Bute
- Lieutenancy area: Argyll and Bute
- Country: Scotland
- Sovereign state: United Kingdom
- Post town: DUNOON, ARGYLL
- Postcode district: PA27
- Dialling code: 01499
- UK Parliament: Argyll, Bute and South Lochaber
- Scottish Parliament: Argyll and Bute

Cairndow (Scottish Gaelic: An Càrn Dubh) is a coastal hamlet in Argyll and Bute, Scotland. The town lies between the A83 road and the head of Loch Fyne.

Cairndow's school closed in 1988 after the roll fell to just 3 pupils. Now children in the area are sent to the primary school in Strachur and the secondary school in Dunoon. Medical facilities for the hamlet are provided by the GP in Strachur. Kilmorich Church at Cairndow was built in 1818 and is a category A listed building.

After originating as an oyster farm in the loch, Loch Fyne Oysters opened its Loch Fyne Oyster Bar in 1988 at Clachan, across the head of the loch from Cairndow. The company has expanded into a restaurant chain, and the Oyster Bar continues to be a tourist attraction at Clachan, Cairndow.

== Ardkinglas House ==
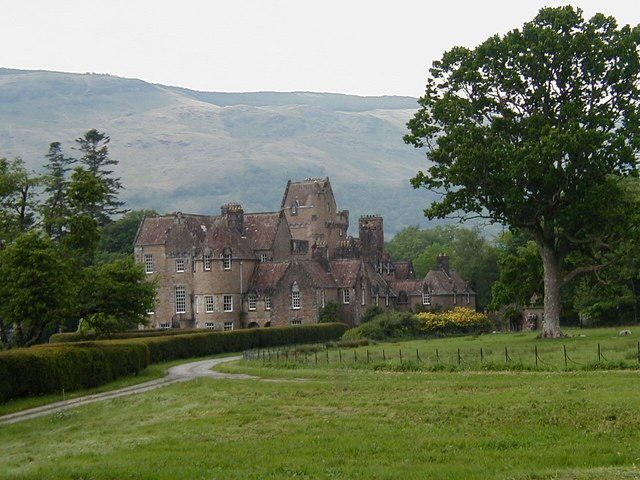
Ardkinglas House, near Cairndow on Loch Fyne

Ardkinglas House is located to the south of the village. Dating back to the 1300s, the Ardkinglas estate extends over more than 4,900 hectares (12,000 acres) of rolling hills and landscaped parkland. The present Ardkinglas House was built by architect Sir Robert Lorimer, completed in eighteen months in the Fall of 1907, and is considered to be his masterpiece. It replaces an earlier house where, in the 1820s, feminist Caroline Sheridan Norton was raised.

The house remains unaltered and is a popular location for television period dramas and film productions, as well as weddings. Today, it is open to the public, however, not on a regular basis, private tours of the house can be booked at any time of the year and public tours are available on Fridays from April to October. The house's original "Butlers Quarters" can be rented all the year round.

The Woodland Gardens, dating from the 18th century, are open all the year round with views of the exterior of the Ardkinglas estate, with its scenic backdrop on Loch Fyne.

== Geography ==
=== Climate ===
Climate data for Lephinmore climate station (9m elevation) 1991–2020 averages, rainy days 1981-2010
| Month | Jan | Feb | Mar | Apr | May | Jun | Jul | Aug | Sep | Oct | Nov | Dec | Year |
|---|---|---|---|---|---|---|---|---|---|---|---|---|---|
| Mean daily maximum °C (°F) | 7.2 (45.0) | 7.9 (46.2) | 9.2 (48.6) | 12.3 (54.1) | 15.4 (59.7) | 17.1 (62.8) | 18.8 (65.8) | 17.5 (63.5) | 16.0 (60.8) | 12.7 (54.9) | 9.6 (49.3) | 7.6 (45.7) | 12.6 (54.7) |
| Mean daily minimum °C (°F) | 2.2 (36.0) | 2.3 (36.1) | 3.3 (37.9) | 4.3 (39.7) | 7.0 (44.6) | 9.7 (49.5) | 11.3 (52.3) | 10.8 (51.4) | 9.5 (49.1) | 7.0 (44.6) | 4.2 (39.6) | 2.1 (35.8) | 6.1 (43.1) |
| Average rainfall mm (inches) | 242.8 (9.56) | 165.4 (6.51) | 171.9 (6.77) | 117.2 (4.61) | 93.7 (3.69) | 111.4 (4.39) | 110.0 (4.33) | 137.6 (5.42) | 161.1 (6.34) | 221.4 (8.72) | 209.3 (8.24) | 215.7 (8.49) | 1,957.5 (77.07) |
| Average rainy days (≥ 1.0 mm) | 21.2 | 14.8 | 18.5 | 13.7 | 12.7 | 15.2 | 15.9 | 15.6 | 18.8 | 19.2 | 18.7 | 18.4 | 202.6 |
| Mean monthly sunshine hours | 37.6 | 61.5 | 85.6 | 148.3 | 154.6 | 150.0 | 157.5 | 119.4 | 86.7 | 77.9 | 51.0 | 26.5 | 1,156.6 |
Source: metoffice.gov.uk

== Gallery ==
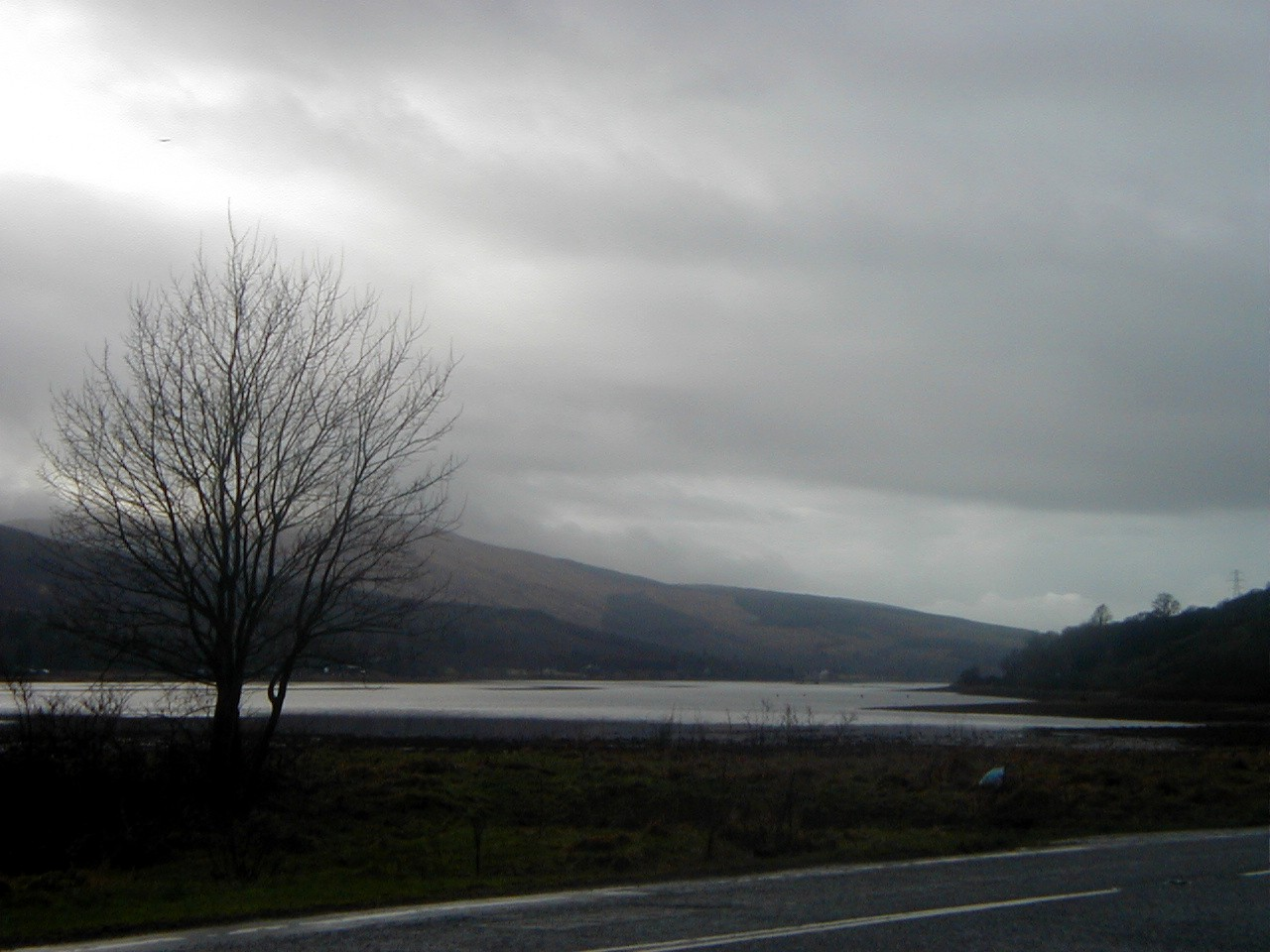
A view across Loch Fyne near Cairndow

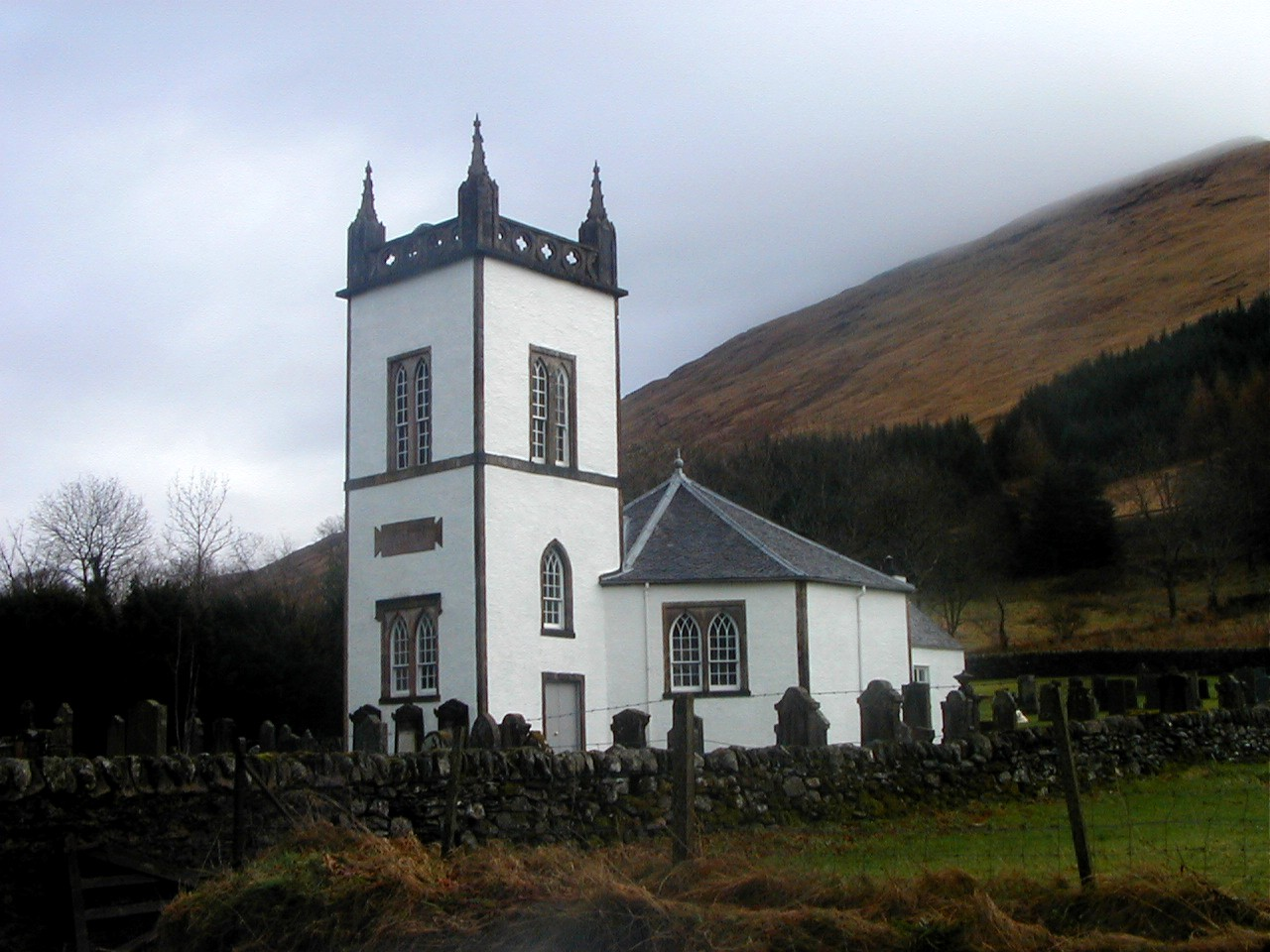
The kirk at Cairndow

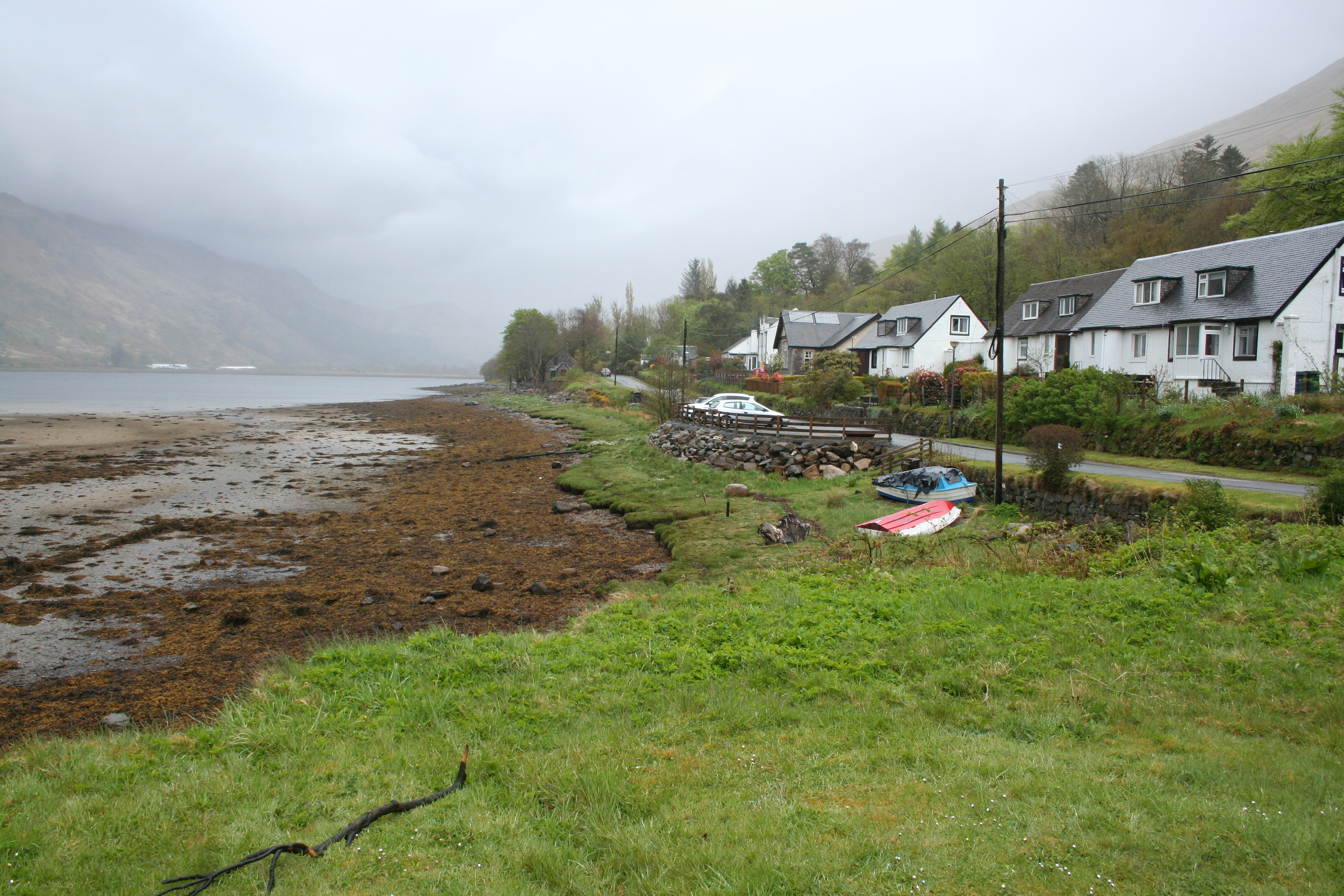
Scotland Argyll Bute Cairndow Argyll and Bute

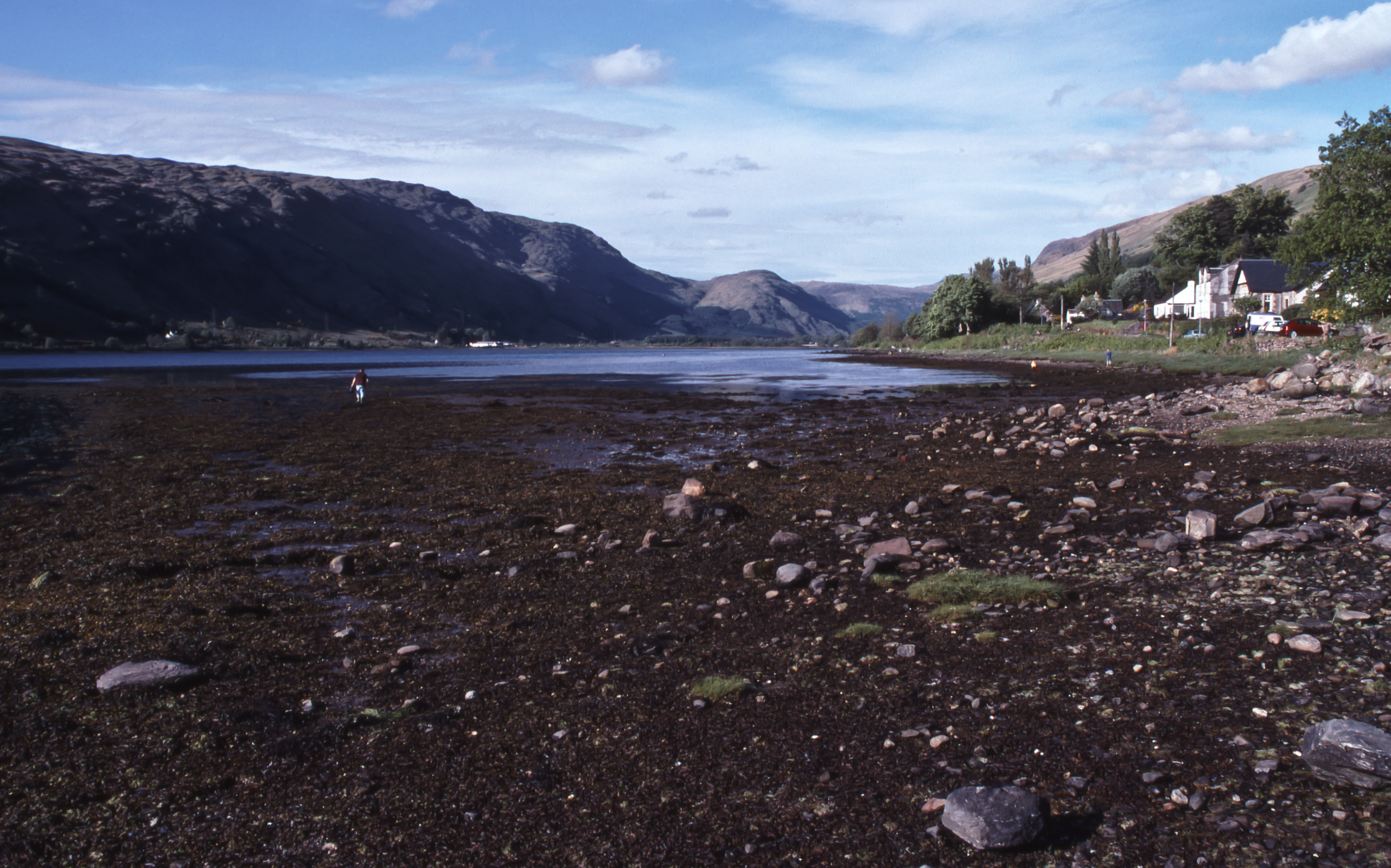
Loch Fyne, Cairndow, (May 2001) - panoramio
