= Dumbarton (Parliament of Scotland constituency) =

Constituency of the Old Parliament of Scotland in West Dunbartonshire, Scotland

Dumbarton was a royal burgh that returned one commissioner to the Parliament of Scotland and to the Convention of Estates.

After the Acts of Union 1707, Dumbarton, Glasgow, Renfrew and Rutherglen formed the Glasgow district of burghs, returning one member between them to the House of Commons of Great Britain.

== List of burgh commissioners ==
- 1661–63, 1669-1670: Walter Watson, provost
- 1665 convention:no representation
- 1667 convention: Robert Cuningham
- 1672–73, 1678 (convention): Robert Watson, provost
- 1681–82: William MacFarlane, provost
- 1685–86, 1689 convention, 1689–1702, 1702–07: James Smollett of Bonhill, provost

== See also ==
- List of constituencies in the Parliament of Scotland at the time of the Union
