= Alexander Erskine of Gogar =

Scottish landowner

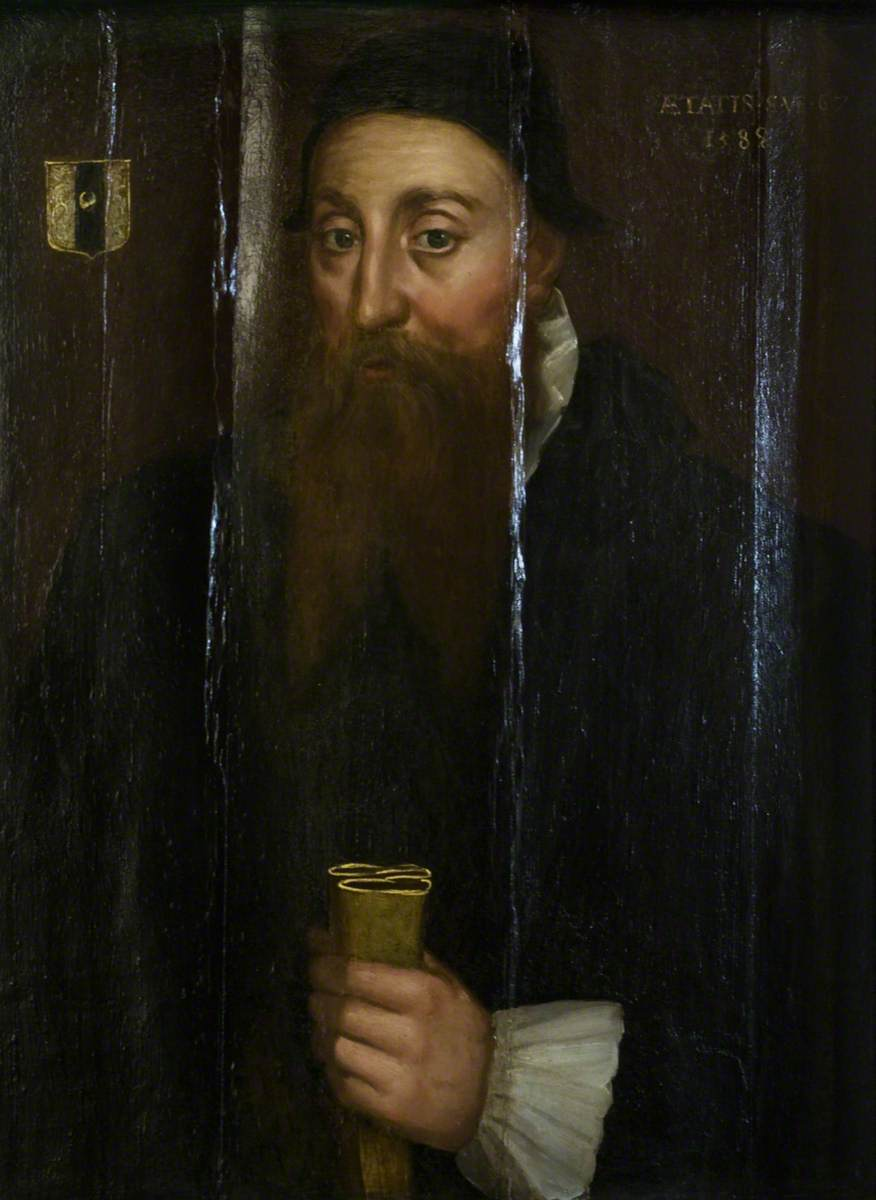
Portrait of Alexander Erskine of Gogar.

Alexander Erskine of Gogar (died 1592) was a Scottish landowner and keeper of James VI of Scotland at Stirling Castle.

== Career ==
Alexander Erskine was a son of John Erskine, 5th Lord Erskine and Margaret Campbell, a daughter of Archibald Campbell, 2nd Earl of Argyll. He was laird of the lands of Gogar, a place near Stirling.

During the Scottish Reformation, Erskine gave sworn testimony to an inquiry in November 1559. He was said to be around 36 years old. He had accompanied Mary of Guise when she left Holyrood Palace to reside in Leith.

After the death of his brother, John Erskine, Earl of Mar, Alexander was given the task of safeguarding the young king of Scotland at Stirling in 1572. Alexander was offered a pension from England of £150 a year, for which he was recommended by Regent Morton in 1574 as "well friended, constant, of good credit and power." In 1575, Francis Walsingham heard that Morton secretly planned to take the King out of Alexander's keeping. This was not in Morton's power, as the appointment had been made by the Parliament of Scotland. Walsingham resolved to make Alexander an ally of England, in case Morton lost his position. The crisis of 1575 blew over.

After the Earl of Morton resigned the Regency of Scotland, on 28 March 1578, Alexander was appointed Keeper of Edinburgh Castle in the place of George Douglas of Parkhead. Alexander undertook to look after the artillery of the castle and the coffer of jewellery which had belonged to Mary, Queen of Scots. In January 1579, the keys of the coffer were given to William Ruthven, 1st Earl of Gowrie, as treasurer of Scotland.

== Coup at Stirling Castle ==
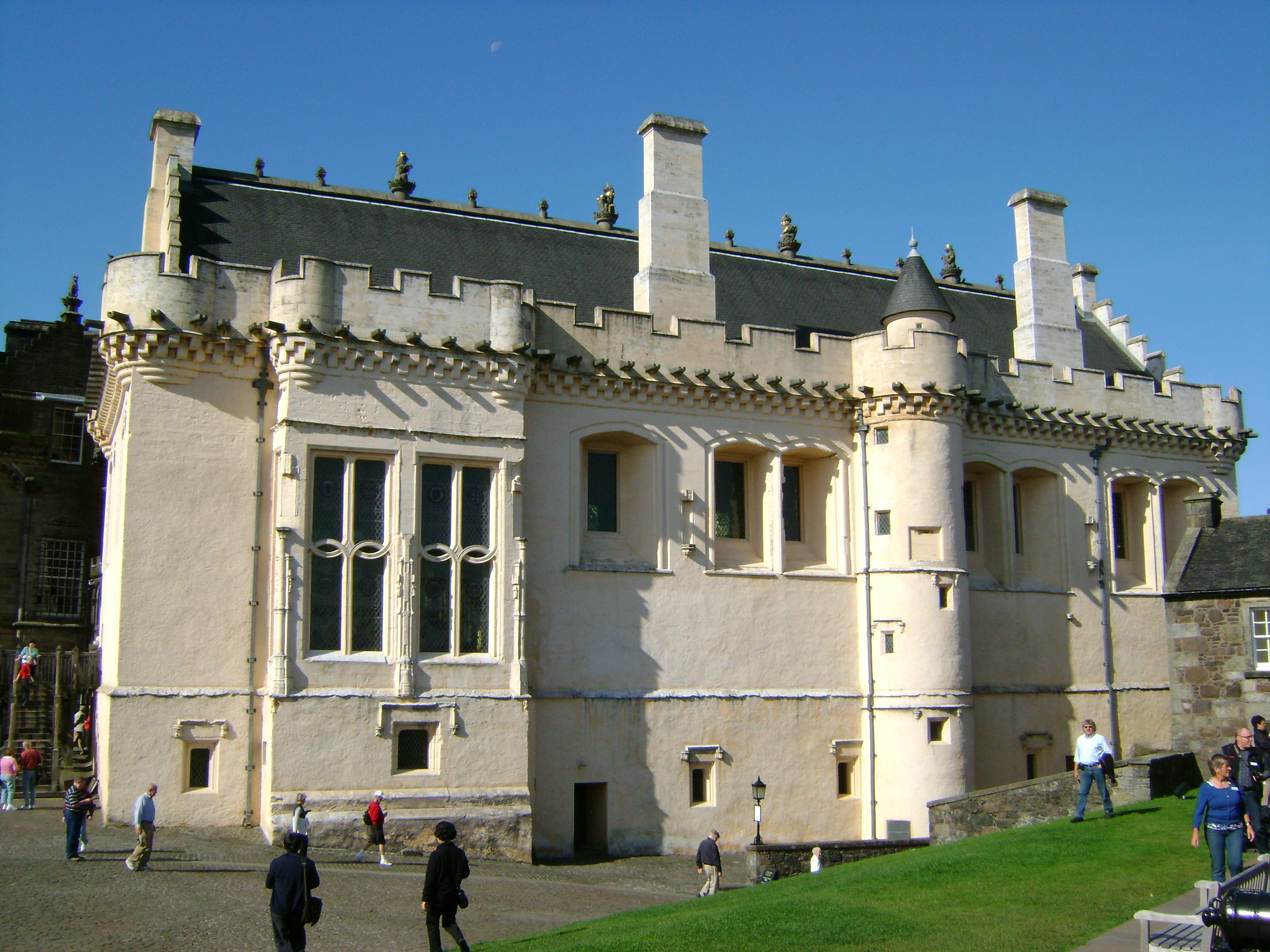
Alexander Erskine negotiated terms with the Commendators in the Great Hall of Stirling Castle while King James VI was terrified.

Alexander Erskine of Gogar was ousted from his duty at Stirling by his kinsman and ally of the former Regent Morton, Adam Erskine, Commendator of Cambuskenneth, in April 1578. The events were described by the English diplomat in Scotland, Robert Bowes. Adam Erskine had persuaded Alexander's nephew, the young Earl of Mar, that he should be the guardian of James VI. Adam Erskine and his brother David Erskine, Commendator of Dryburgh, and the Earl of Mar, who were all lodged in Stirling Castle, came to the gate early on Sunday morning, 27 April 1578, pretending to go out to join a hunt. The two Commendators met Alexander, who held the castle keys, and began to argue with him over the guardianship of the King.

Alexander seized a halberd and called his servants. There was a brief struggle, and then Alexander and the Commendators went into the Great Hall to discuss the matter. Colin Campbell, 6th Earl of Argyll, was also present in the castle with his followers, and was prepared to fight, but eventually they decided to yield to the young Earl of Mar. During the struggle at the Castle, Gogar's eldest son was fatally injured and a servant named Buchanan was hurt. The young king was said to have torn his hair in distress during the incident, fearing that Alexander had been killed.

Alexander and Argyll then left Stirling, both parties and the King's tutor George Buchanan having written letters to the Privy Council in Edinburgh to declare that all were reconciled and that nothing had changed that would affect the government of Scotland.

Despite these letters, the effect of the change of hands at the castle was to help the former Regent Morton regain some of his power, because previously he had lost access to the King's authority. Elizabeth I of England, who was a supporter of Morton's rule, sent a letter of support to the Earl of Mar. Morton would later deny any involvement in the events at Stirling Castle.

=== Analysis by David Hume of Godscroft ===
A 17th-century historian of the Douglas family David Hume of Godscroft noted the lack of evidence for Morton's involvement, and suggested that Erskine of Gogar was "a man of a good easie nature, and no ill disposition, ... nothing factious or malicious" but had been an instrument of others, firstly in giving access to the King to Morton's opponents at Stirling, and then "almost after the same manner" being turned out of the Castle himself. Hume of Godscroft suggested, with no evidence but hearsay, that the Comptroller of the Exchequer William Murray of Tullibardine, the Earl of Mar's uncle, might have been behind the removal of Gogar from Stirling Castle and employed by Morton.

== Depute Chamberlain ==
On 23 December 1583 Ludovic Stewart, 2nd Duke of Lennox was made the High and Great Chamberlain of Scotland, and first Gentleman of the King's Bedchamber, as his father had been, and Alexander Erskine of Gogar, Captain of Edinburgh Castle was made his depute. The role included taking oaths of fidelity to the King from the other officers, ushers, and varlets of the Bedchamber and Wardrobe.

In December 1584 Erskine received a royal gift of income from the customs of Edinburgh and other lands, for his work as Captain of Edinburgh Castle, and for keeping the King's House in Striling during the king's minority years.

He died in 1592.

== Family ==
Alexander married Margaret Home in 1564, a daughter of George Home, 4th Lord Home and Mariotta Haliburton. Their children included:

- Thomas Erskine, 1st Earl of Kellie.
- Mary Erskine (d. 1614), who married Dugald Campbell of Auchenbreck
- James Erskine, who married on 17 May 1594 Marie Erskine, daughter of Adam Erskine, Commendator of Cambuskenneth.
- George Erskine of Innerteil was the father of Mary Erskine, who married Sir John MacKenzie of Tarbat in 1629. Their son was George Mackenzie, 1st Earl of Cromartie.
- Jonet Erskine, who married (1) George Auchinleck of Balmanno (d. 1596), the confidential servant of Regent Morton, (2) John Leslie of Balquhain
- Christian Erskine, who married in 1579 Alexander Home of Manderston

== Genealogical table ==
Alexander Erskine's relatives (selective chart)

John Erskine; 5th Lord Erskine; 1487-1555	Lady Margaret Campbell
Annabell Murray, Countess of Mar; 153-1603	John Erskine, Earl of Mar; Regent Mar died 1572	Robert Erskine; Master of Erskine	Thomas Erskine; Master of Erskine	Alexander Erskine of Gogar; Master of Mar died 1592	Catherine Erskine	Margaret Erskine; 1515-1572	James V of Scotland; 1512-1542	Arthur Erskine of Blackgrange died 1571
Marie Erskine	Margaret Erskine	John Erskine, 2nd Earl of Mar; 1558-1634	David Erskine, Commendator of Dryburgh died 1611	Adam Erskine; Commendator of Cambuskenneth d. b. 1608	James Stewart, 1st Earl of Moray; 1531-1570
John Erskine; 3rd Earl of Mar; 1585-1654
