= Malt tax =

A malt tax is a tax upon the making or sale of malted grain, which has been prepared using a process of steeping and drying to encourage germination and the conversion of its starch into sugars. Used in the production of beer and whisky for centuries, it is also an ingredient in modern foods.

== Background ==
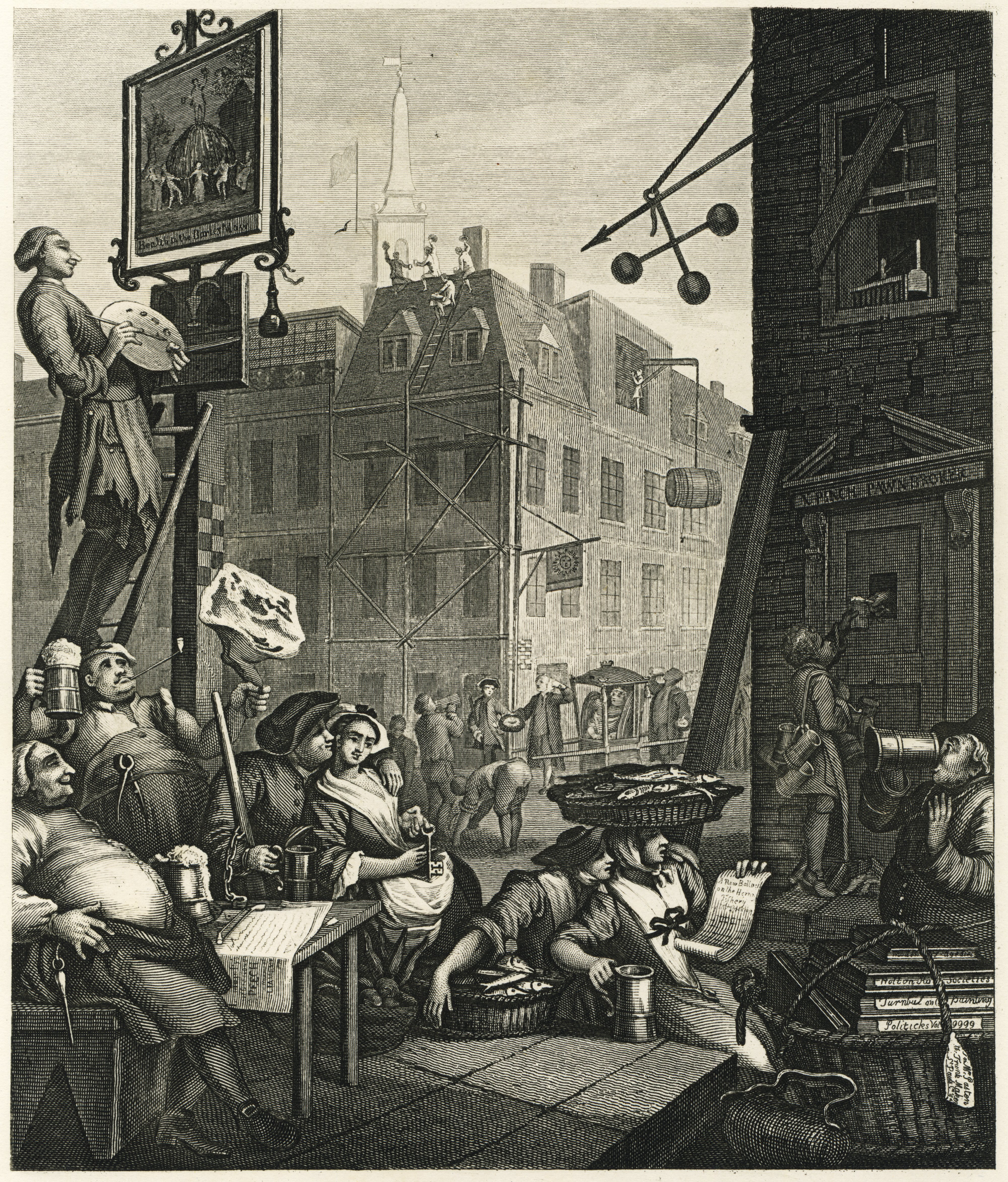
Beer Street, by Hogarth; used to emphasise the healthy nature of a drink safer than most water

Until the late 19th century, lack of access to clean drinking water meant particularly in urban areas, it was often safer to drink so-called small beer. These had relatively low levels of alcohol and were routinely drunk throughout the day by both workers and children; in 1797, one educationalist suggested for '...more robust children, water is preferable, and for the weaker ones, small beer ...'.

This meant malt was seen as an essential part of dietary health for the poor and taxing it caused widespread dissent.

== Taxation ==
In England, malt was first taxed in 1644 by the Crown to help finance the English Civil War.

Article 14 of the Acts of Union 1707 between England and Scotland agreed the malt tax would not be applicable in Scotland until the conclusion of the 1701-1714 War of the Spanish Succession. After the Peace of Utrecht in April 1713, Parliament voted to extend the tax, despite protests from the 45 Scots Members of Parliament, which reflected general discontent on the impact of Union. At a meeting with Queen Anne on 26 May, a deputation that included the Earl of Mar and Duke of Argyll asked her to dissolve the Union, which was refused.

According to William Cobbett, this tax contributed to inequality, poverty, and malnutrition in England, as it created a monopoly for malting and brewing, preventing ordinary householders from brewing their own nutritious beer for everyday use.

== See also ==
- Malt tax riots
