= Loch Fyne Restaurants =

British seafood restaurant chain

Loch Fyne Seafood & Grill
- Company type: Seafood restaurants
- Predecessor: Loch Fyne Oysters
- Successor: Greene King
- Headquarters: United Kingdom
- Website: www.lochfyneseafoodandgrill.co.uk

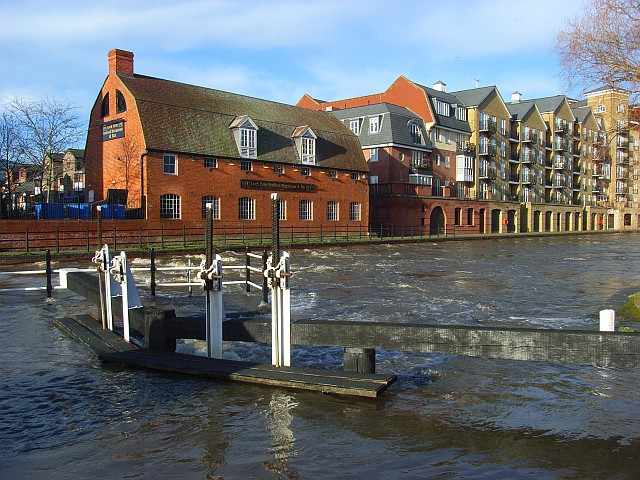
The former Loch Fyne restaurant in Reading is in a former brewery building by the River Kennet.

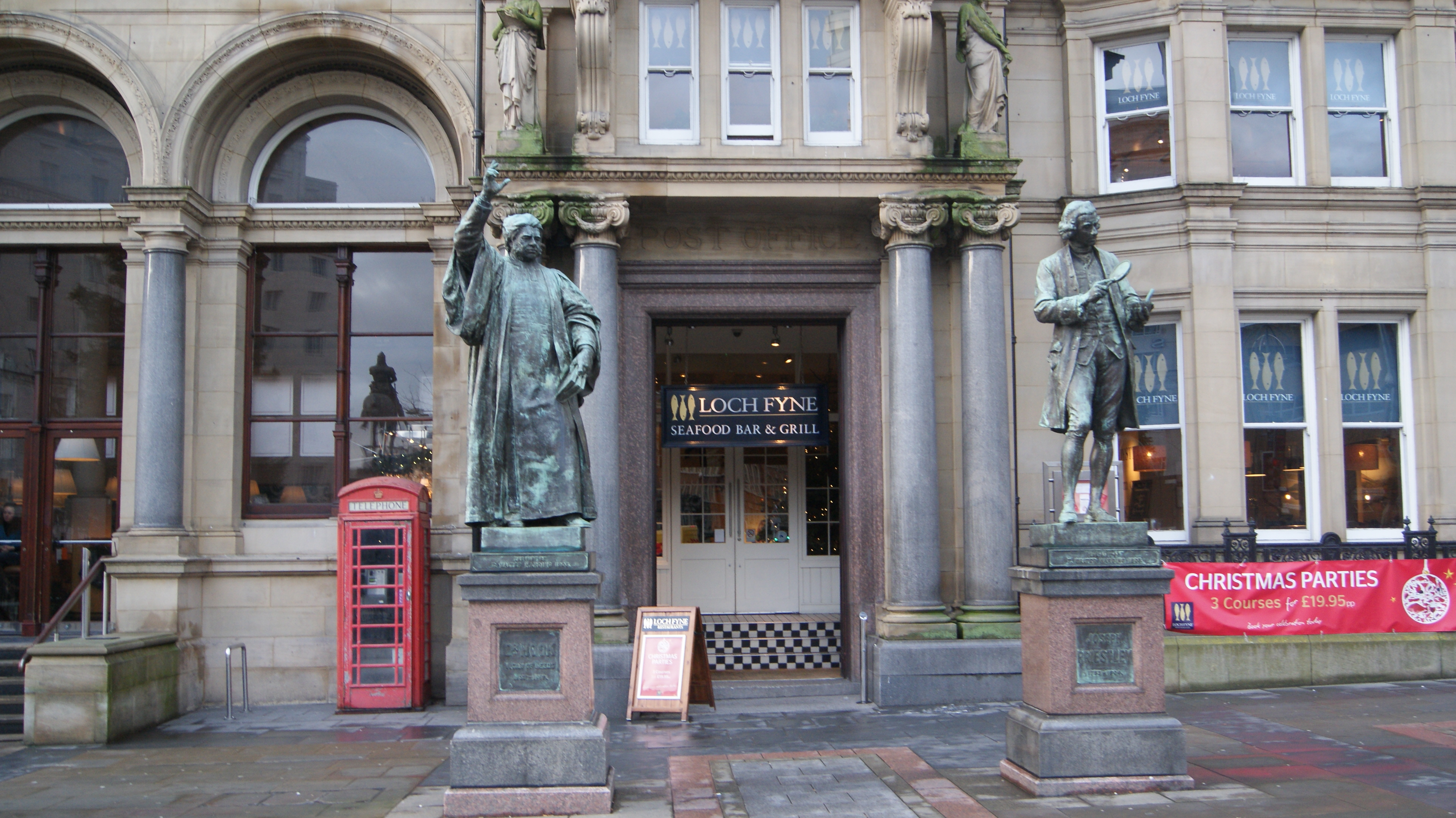
The former Loch Fyne restaurant on City Square in Leeds, West Yorkshire.

Loch Fyne Restaurants was the name of a chain of seafood restaurants in the United Kingdom owned and operated by Greene King plc.

== History ==
The company took its name from Loch Fyne, a sea loch on the west coast of Scotland. The business started life as part of Loch Fyne Oysters but, in September 2006, the restaurant chain (then comprising 36 restaurants) was bought by Greene King for £68 million.

Loch Fyne Oysters continues in business under separate ownership; it owns the "Loch Fyne" brand and supplied much of the seafood used by the restaurant chain.

In 2008 Loch Fyne Restaurants was reported by the BBC to be paying their waiting staff a base salary below the minimum wage made up to legal levels by tips.

At its largest, the chain had over 40 restaurants. Some had already closed by 2020, and due to the COVID-19 pandemic of 2020, Loch Fyne permanently closed 11 more restaurants, with further closures following and the last restaurants closing in November 2023.
