= Neil Buchanan (politician) =

Neil Buchanan (c. 1696–1744) of Hillington, Renfrewshire, and Botolph Lane, Eastcheap, London was a British merchant and Whig politician who sat in the House of Commons from 1741 to 1744.

Buchanan was the third son of George Buchanan of Glasgow and his wife Mary Maxwell. daughter of Gabriel Maxwel. He was educated at Glasgow in 1711 and moved to London where he became a tobacco merchant. He married Anna Rae, daughter of George Rae, merchant of Glasgow

At the 1741 Buchanan was returned as Member of Parliament for Glasgow as an opposition Whig. He voted against the Government on the chairman of the elections committee on 18 December 1741. After the fall of Walpole in 1742, he received correspondence from the Glasgow town council, who had supported his election, commending his conduct in Parliament and instructing him to work to reform the constitution by making parliament more active and reducing the amount of patronage. In Parliament he followed the lead of the Duke of Argyll, and voted against the Hanoverians on 10 December 1742. Argyll died in 1743 whereupon he went over to the Government side and voted with them on the Hanoverians on 6 December 1743 and again on 18 January 1744.

Buchanan died on 12 March 1744 leaving four sons and five daughters.

Parliament of Great Britain
Preceded by William Campbell	Member of Parliament for Glasgow; 1741–1744	Succeeded by John Campbell, Marquess of Lorne
