= Sir Duncan Campbell, 2nd Baronet =

Scottish noble

Sir Duncan Campbell (19 October 1583 – 1 February 1645), 2nd Baronet and 6th Lord of Auchinbreck, was a Scottish landowner and soldier. He was commander of the Marquess of Argyll, Archibald Campbell's troops, (Covenanters) in Ireland.

He was a son of Sir Dugald Campbell, 1st Baronet of Auchinbreck and Mary Erskine. He was recalled by Archibald Campbell to Scotland and placed in command of the Covenanter troops at the Battle of Inverlochy (1645).

Duncan Campbell was born circa 1597 in Colquhoun, Dunbartonshire, Scotland. He was the second son of Dugald Campbell of Auchinbreck and Mary Erskine, and succeeded him in 1641. He bought Carnasserie Castle from the Marquess of Argyll in 1643.

He served in Parliament for Argyllshire from 1628 to 1643.

During the Irish Wars of the early 1640s, Campbell led his Covenanter troops from Argyll in the massacre of many local Catholic MacDonalds on Rathlin Island. On 2 February 1645, back in Scotland, he led Argyll's troops at Inverlochy where he was taken prisoner and killed, probably in retaliation for his massacre of the Catholic MacDonalds a few years earlier.

== Titles ==
- 2nd Baronet and 6th Lord of Auchinbreck
- Governor of Rathlin Island
- Member of Parliament for Argyllshire Scotland between 1639 and 1641
- Member of Parliament for Argyllshire Scotland in 1643

== Battles ==
- Irish Rebellion of 1641
- Wars of the Three Kingdoms
- Battle of Inverlochy (1645)

== Family ==
Sir Duncan Campbell, 2nd Baronet and 6th Laird of Auchinbreck (1597–1645) was commander of Argyll's troops in Ireland in 1641 and taking of Dunluce Castle, County Antrim. He held the office of Governor of Rathlin Island. He married first Margaret Blair, who was born about 1575. She was the daughter of the Lord of Blair, and died without issue. He married second, Marion Maxwell, daughter of Patrick Maxwell of Newark. They had issue:

- a) Dugald Campbell, Third Baronet, born abt 1629 in Auchinbreck. He succeeded his father in 1645 and sat in Parliament for Argyllshire in 1649. He died unmarried about 1662 and was succeeded by his nephew, Sir Duncan, son of Archibald Campbell of Knockumilie.
- b) Miss Campbell, b. 1627, md. Lord of Lechnel.

He married third, 1628, Dame Jean Colquhoun, daughter of Alexander Colquhoun of Luss, widow of Alan Cathcart, 5th Lord Cathcart (1600–1628). She was born about 1610. Duncan and Jean had issue:

- a) Archibald, born abt 1629, of Knockamillie, who married Margaret Campbell, daughter to Colin, Tutor of Calder by whom he had a son, Sir. Duncan.
  - a1) Sir Duncan: 4th Baronet eldest son of Archibald of Knockemelie; Member of Parliament for Argyllshire, 1689–1698; m. 1679/80 dau. of 1st Earl of Balcarres; d. abt 1700.
- b) James: born about 1630 of Knockumilie. He married Janet McLoed about 1650.
- c) William Campbell, of Wester Kaimes.
- d) Alexander of Strondour, born about 1635 was married to Jean, eldest daughter to the Lord of Ottir by whom he had issue. He was murdered after the surrender of Carnassarie Castle in June 1685.

== Battle of Inverlochy 1645 ==
On 2 February, Sir Duncan Campbell led Argyll's troops at the Battle of Inverlochy (1645) where he was taken prisoner and executed by Alasdair Mac Colla.

One prisoner who would receive no mercy was Duncan Campbell, Lord Auchinbreck, the functional commander of the covenanters that day. Auchinbreck had ravaged the lands of Alasdair Mac Colla's Irish cousins in Antrim as a commander in the Scottish army in Ireland. Also he had plotted to assassinate Alasdair when Alasdair tried to reconcile with the Scottish army following the defeat at Glen Maquin. Now Alasdair had Auchinbreck brought before him. Alasdair offered Auchinbreck two choices, to be made longer, that is hanged, or made shorter, that is decapitated. Auchinbreck reportedly replied, "da dhiu gun aon roghain," which could be roughly translated as two worst alternatives without one choice. At this point Alasdair swung his two handed sword, and took off the top of Auchinbreck's head above the ears like the top of a soft-boiled egg.

His sister, known as Fionnghal Chaimbeul, wrote a Gaelic lament on the battle of Inverlochy where her brother was killed, and her eldest Hector Roy Maclean fought on the opposing side.

== Bibliography ==
- Royal Commission on the Ancient and Historical Monuments of Scotland
- Clan Campbell History
- ScotWars

Baronetage of Nova Scotia
Preceded by Dugald Campbell	Baronet (of Auchinbreck); 1641–1645	Succeeded by Dugald Campbell
