= Glasgow (Parliament of Scotland constituency) =

Constituency of the Parliament of Scotland

Glasgow in Lanarkshire was a royal burgh that returned one commissioner to the Parliament of Scotland and to the Convention of Estates.

After the Acts of Union 1707, Glasgow, Dumbarton, Renfrew and Rutherglen formed the Glasgow district of burghs, returning one member between them to the House of Commons of Great Britain.

== List of burgh commissioners ==
- 1630 (convention): Gabriel Cunningham, provost
- 1639–1641: Patrick Bell, provost
- 1643–44, 1644: James Bell
- 1645: Colin Campbell of Elie
- 1645–1647, 1649–51: George Porterfield
- 1661–1663: John Bell, provost
- 1665 (convention), 1667 (convention), 1669–1674: William Anderson, provost
- 1678 (convention): James Campbell, provost
- 1681–1682: John Bell, provost
- 1685–86: John Johnston of Clauchrie, provost
- 1689 (convention), 1689–1702: John Anderson of Dowhill, merchant-burgess
- 1702–1707: Hugh Montgomerie of Busbie, provost

== See also ==
- List of constituencies in the Parliament of Scotland at the time of the Union
