= Renfrew (Parliament of Scotland constituency) =

Constituency of the Old Parliament of Scotland

Renfrew was a royal burgh that returned one commissioner to the Parliament of Scotland and to the Convention of Estates.

After the Acts of Union 1707, Renfrew, Dumbarton, Glasgow and Rutherglen formed the Glasgow district of burghs, returning one member between them to the House of Commons of Great Britain.

== List of burgh commissioners ==
Renfrew was represented at meetings on 6 April 1478, 2 April 1481, 2 December 1482, 9 May 1485, 1 October 1487 and 6 October 1488, though the commissioners' names are unknown.

- 1579: John Spreull
- 1587: John Gilchrist of Sandford
- 1593: John Jackson
- 1612, 1617, 1621: William Somerville
- 1633, 1667: Robert Hall of Fulbar
- 1639–41, 1645–47, 1649: John Spreull
- 1640, 1644, 1661: Andrew Semple
- 1643, 1644: John Somerville
- 1645: James Lauder
- 1665 convention, 1678 convention: John Somerville of Townhead, provost
- 1667 convention, 1681, 1685–86: Robert Hall of Fulbar, provost
- 1669–74: Robert Pollock of Milburne
- 1689 (convention), 1689–95: William Cochrane of Kilmaronock
- 1698: Patrick Houston, provost (died c.1699)
- 1700–02: James Campbell of Burnbank and Boquhan
- 1702–07: Colin Campbell of Woodside

== See also ==
- List of constituencies in the Parliament of Scotland at the time of the Union
