= Sir James Campbell, 5th Baronet =

Scottish Jacobite[1] politician and landowner

Arms of the Campbell of Auchinbreck

Sir James Campbell of Auchinbreck, 5th Baronet (1679 – 14 October 1756) was a Scottish Jacobite politician and landowner. He was Lord Commissioner of Justiciary for the Highlands between 1701 and 1711, and Shire Commissioner for Argyllshire between 1703 and 1707. Considered a prominent Argyll laird, the fortune of the Campbells of Auchinbreck had however deteriorated since 1685.

== Biography ==
Sir James Campbell was the son of Sir Duncan Campbell, 4th Baronet (died c. 1700) and Lady Henrietta Lindsay, daughter of Alexander Lindsay, 1st Earl of Balcarres. His grandmother Lady Anna Mackenzie, governess to William III, married his grandfather Lord Balneil and then remarried Archibald Campbell, 9th Earl of Argyll. He was educated at the University of Glasgow (1695).

The progenitor of the Campbells of Auchinbreck Dugald Campbell was made a baronet in 1627. The Auchinbreck Campbells descend from Dugald Campbell of Kilmichael (fl. 15th century), a son of Duncan Campbell, 1st Lord Campbell, who received a large charter for the lands of Auchinbreck in 1452. The Campbells of Auchinbreck, regarded as among the most considerable branches of Clan Campbell, were one of the very few Campbell branches to support the Jacobite cause.

In 1700 he succeeded his father to the Campbell baronetcy, of Auchinbreck (Nova Scotia) and as the laird of Auchinbreck. He was Lord Commissioner of Justiciary for the Highlands between 1701 and 1711. He was Shire Commissioner for Argyllshire between 1703 and 1707. He was a Burgess of Edinburgh and of Inveraray.

As a prominent Argyll laird, his support to the Jacobite cause was significant in the West Highlands. He was a Jacobite conspirator since 1715, as he felt that the Dukes of Argyll had neglected his family during the course of their misfortunes. Restoring the Stuart monarchs also provided Auchinbreck with opportunity to regain wealth and prominence which was not otherwise attainable. During the Jacobite rising of 1745 Auchinbreck, who considered himself too elderly too participate in the rebellion, was arrested and imprisoned at Dumbarton Castle. He was later released and was not among those executed for treason. Auchinbreck was attainted and his large Argyll estates were confiscated nonetheless. Forced to live off of sparse Jacobite remittances, he died on 14 October 1756 at Lochgair.

== Family ==
Sir James was married three times and had 17 children. He married firstly Margaret Campbell, the daughter of Campbell of Carradale. He married secondly Janet MacLeod, the daughter of Iain Breac MacLeod of MacLeod, 18th Chief of Clan MacLeod. He married thirdly, his 'cousin', Susanna Campbell, the daughter of Campbell of Cawdor.

His daughter Anne was married to Donald Cameron of Lochiel, Chief of Clan Cameron, popularly known as the 'Gentle Lochiel', who played an important role in the '45. He was succeeded in the baronetcy by his grandson, Sir James Campbell, 6th Baronet (1721–1814), who was the only son of Duncan Campbell (his eldest son by Janet MacLeod).

Following the death of his grandson in 1814, the baronetcy became extinct.

== See also ==
- Campbell baronets of Auchinbreck
- Campbell of Auchinbreck
- Donald Cameron of Lochiel

Parliament of Scotland
Preceded by Sir Colin Campbell	Shire Commissioner for Argyllshire; 1703 – 1707	Succeeded by Parliament of the United Kingdom
Baronetage of Nova Scotia
Preceded by Duncan Campbell	Baronet (of Auchinbreck); 1700–1756	Succeeded by James Campbell
