= Charles Oliphant =

Scottish physician and politician

Charles Oliphant (1666 – 9 December 1719) was a Scottish physician and politician who sat in the House of Commons from 1710 to 1719. He built his medical career in Edinburgh, but moved to London in 1708. He became physician to the Prince of Wales (later King George II).

== Early life and family ==
Oliphant was the second son of Charles Oliphant of Edinburgh, a principal clerk of the court of session and a descendant of the 3rd Lord Oliphant. His mother Barbara was a daughter of Patrick Kinloch of Alderston, Haddingtonshire. He graduated from Edinburgh University with an M.A. in 1684, from Leiden in 1687, and was awarded his MD at Rheims University in 1691.

== Edinburgh ==
Oliphant set up a medical practice off High Street in Edinburgh, and became a fellow of the Royal College of Physicians of Edinburgh in 1693. In 1699 he published a treatise on vomiting during fevers, which was challenged in 1701 by Dr George Cheyne in his New Theory of Continual Fevers. Oliphant realised that Cheyne's criticism had been prompted by Dr Archibald Pitcairne, a fellow Edinburgh physician with whom Oliphant had been friendly at the start of the 1690 but fell out with over the course of the decade. Oliphant responded with a series of attacks on Pitcairne's work, accusing him of plagiarism. The dispute escalated into an acrimonious exchange of pamphlets.

== London ==
In 1708, Oliphant moved permanently to London, attributing his decision to the Act of Union. He had concluded that "our remoteness from the centre of the government must certainly drain us, and carry all those that have ambulatory employments, or live by their industry, to live in England".

At the 1710 general election, Oliphant was elected in the Duke of Argyll's interest (MP) as the Member of Parliament (MP) for Ayr Burghs. He had no previous connection to the area and appears to have been rather uninterested its affairs, but with the Duke's support he was re-elected 1715. Argyll also help to secure Oliphant's appointment in 1714 as physician to George, Prince of Wales.

Oliphant died in 1719. He had married before 1698, a daughter of Sir John Young of Leny, Edinburgh and left 2 daughters, one of whom, Mary, married Lord Strathmore.

Parliament of the United Kingdom
Preceded by Hon. James Campbell	Member of Parliament for Ayr Burghs; 1710 – 1719	Succeeded by Thomas Kennedy
