= Loch Fyne Oysters =

Scottish seafood company

Coordinates: 56.272591°N 4.927201°W

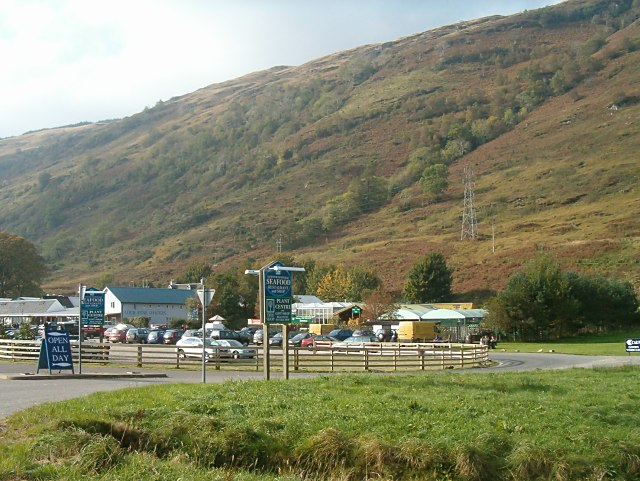
- The original Loch Fyne Oyster Bar at Clachan, near Cairndow.
- Industry: Restaurant
- Founded: 1979 in Scotland
- Headquarters: Loch Fyne, Scotland.
- Area served: UK
- Products: Seafood
- Website: www.lochfyne.com

Loch Fyne Oysters is a seafood and meat company that operates on the banks of Loch Fyne, Scotland. The company created the Loch Fyne Restaurants chain, which was later sold to Greene King. Loch Fyne Oysters still owns the Loch Fyne brand and supplies its products to the restaurant chain.

== History ==
The company takes its name from Loch Fyne, a sea loch on the west coast of Scotland. The business started life in 1979 as an oyster farm in that loch. It was originally a joint venture by Johnny Noble, the owner of the nearby Ardkinglas Estate, and Andy Lane, a fish farmer and biologist. Initially the business sold their oysters to UK restaurants. In the early 1980s the company diversified into the supply of other seafood, and opened a smokehouse to smoke salmon and other fish.

In 1988 the Loch Fyne Oyster Bar was opened adjacent to the A83 road on the banks of the loch at Clachan, on the other side of the head of the loch from Cairndow. The first Loch Fyne Oyster Bar away from the loch opened in Nottingham in 1990, followed by a second near Peterborough. Towards the end of the 1990s, the founders of the business began to look for partners to develop a larger restaurant chain and were joined by two entrepreneurs, Ian Glyn and Mark Derry. In 1998 the Loch Fyne Restaurant chain was founded, as a separately owned business using the Loch Fyne name under licence from Loch Fyne Oysters.

In 2002, Johnny Noble died and Loch Fyne Oysters was placed on the market. In 2003 it became an employee owned company, with its shares owned by 100 of its employees. Loch Fyne Oysters continues to run the Cairndow Oyster Bar, along with the oyster and mussel farms and smokehouses. It sells its product to the Loch Fyne Restaurant chain, to other restaurants, and over the internet.

As of 2007, the Loch Fyne Restaurant chain operated 38 restaurants across the UK. In August 2007, the restaurant chain (but not Loch Fyne Oysters) was bought by the Greene King Brewery for £68 million.

In 2012, the employee-owned company was taken over by Scottish Seafood Investments.

In 2013 Loch Fyne Oysters Ltd as part of an aquaculture strategy bought a controlling share of Seasalter (Walney) Ltd, the UK's only mainland oyster hatchery and producers of Morecambe Bay Oysters.

In 2013 Loch Fyne Oysters Ltd also acquired the assets of Hebridean Mussels & Hebridean Seafoods a well established mussel farming and processing business located in Loch Roag on the Isle of Lewis.

In 2023, the company was acquired by Associated Seafoods Ltd.

In 2024, Associated Seafoods Ltd. announced that the salmon processing would be moved to Buckie. The factory is to be converted to a charcuterie in the coming years.

== See also ==
- List of seafood restaurants
