= Clyde Burghs =

Parliamentary constituency in the United Kingdom, 1801–1832

Clyde Burghs or Glasgow Burghs
- Former district of burghs constituency for the House of Commons
- Subdivision: Lanarkshire, Dunbartonshire, Renfrewshire
- Major settlements: Dumbarton, Glasgow, Rutherglen, Renfrew

1708–1832
- Created from: Dumbarton; Glasgow; Renfrew; Rutherglen
- Replaced by: Glasgow constituency Kilmarnock Burghs

Clyde Burghs, also known as Glasgow Burghs, was a district of burghs constituency of the House of Commons of Great Britain (at Westminster) from 1708 to 1800 and of the House of Commons of the United Kingdom (also at Westminster) from 1801 to 1832. It elected one Member of Parliament (MP).

== Creation ==
The British parliamentary constituency was created in 1708 following the Acts of Union, 1707 and replaced the former Parliament of Scotland burgh constituencies of Glasgow, Dumbarton, Renfrew and Rutherglen.

== Boundaries ==
The constituency consisted of parliamentary burghs along the River Clyde and the Firth of Clyde: Dumbarton in the county of Dumbarton, Glasgow and Rutherglen in the county of Lanark, and Renfrew in the county of Renfrew.

== History ==
The constituency elected one Member of Parliament (MP) by the first past the post system until the seat was abolished for the 1832 general election.

When the district of burghs constituency was abolished in 1832 the Glasgow parliamentary burgh was merged into the then new two-member Glasgow constituency. The Dumbarton, Renfrew and Rutherglen burghs were combined with Kilmarnock burgh and Port Glasgow burgh in the then-new Kilmarnock Burghs constituency.

== Members of Parliament ==
Election	Member	Party
1708	Robert Rodger	
1710	Thomas Smith	
1716	Daniel Campbell	
1727	John Blackwood	
1728	Daniel Campbell	
1734	William Campbell	
1741	Neil Buchanan	
1744	John Campbell, Marquess of Lorne, later 5th Duke of Argyll	
1761	Lord Frederick Campbell	
1780	John Craufurd	
1784	Ilay Campbell	Pittite
1790	John Craufurd	
1790	William McDowall	
1802	Alexander Houstoun	
1803	Boyd Alexander	
1806	Archibald Campbell	Tory
1809	Alexander Houstoun	
1812	Kirkman Finlay	Tory
1818	Alexander Houstoun	
1820	Archibald Campbell	Tory
1831	Joseph Dixon	Whig
