= William Campbell (MP) =

Scottish politician and British Army officer

William Campbell (c.1710–1787) was a British Army officer and Scottish politician who sat in the House of Commons from 1734 to 1741.

Campbell was the fourth son of Hon. John Campbell of Mamore and his wife Elizabeth Elphinstone, the daughter of John, 8th Lord Elphinstone. His brothers included Charles Campbell and Gen. John Campbell. He was educated at Glasgow in 1725. He married Susanna Barnard, daughter of John Barnard of Jamaica.

In 1727 Campbell was appointed Gentleman usher to Queen Caroline. In 1731, he was a cornet in the Royal Horse Guards. At the 1734 British general election he was returned as Member of Parliament for Glasgow on the recommendation of his first cousin, John Campbell, 2nd Duke of Argyll. In 1737, he was appointed Equerry to the Duke of Cumberland. In Parliament he followed the Duke of Argyll into opposition, and voted against the Spanish convention in 1739. He was not put up again at the 1741 British general election apparently being completely unsatisfactory. For example, three years later when the Duke of Argyll suggested another candidate for Glasgow a respondent replied that his previous nominee had written only three letters to Glasgow corporation in seven years and he did not even who the magistrates were. In 1741 Campbell became lieutenant and captain in the Coldstream Guards and was on the reserve in 1744.

Later, Campbell bought Liston Hall in Essex, where he built ‘an elegant modern building on the site of the ancient manor house’. He married as his second wife twice widowed Bridget Bacon, daughter of Philip Bacon of Ipswich, on 7 April 1762. Her previous husbands were Edward Evers of Ipswich, and Sir Cordell Firebrace, 3rd Baronet. He died 8 September 1787 leaving two sons by his first wife.

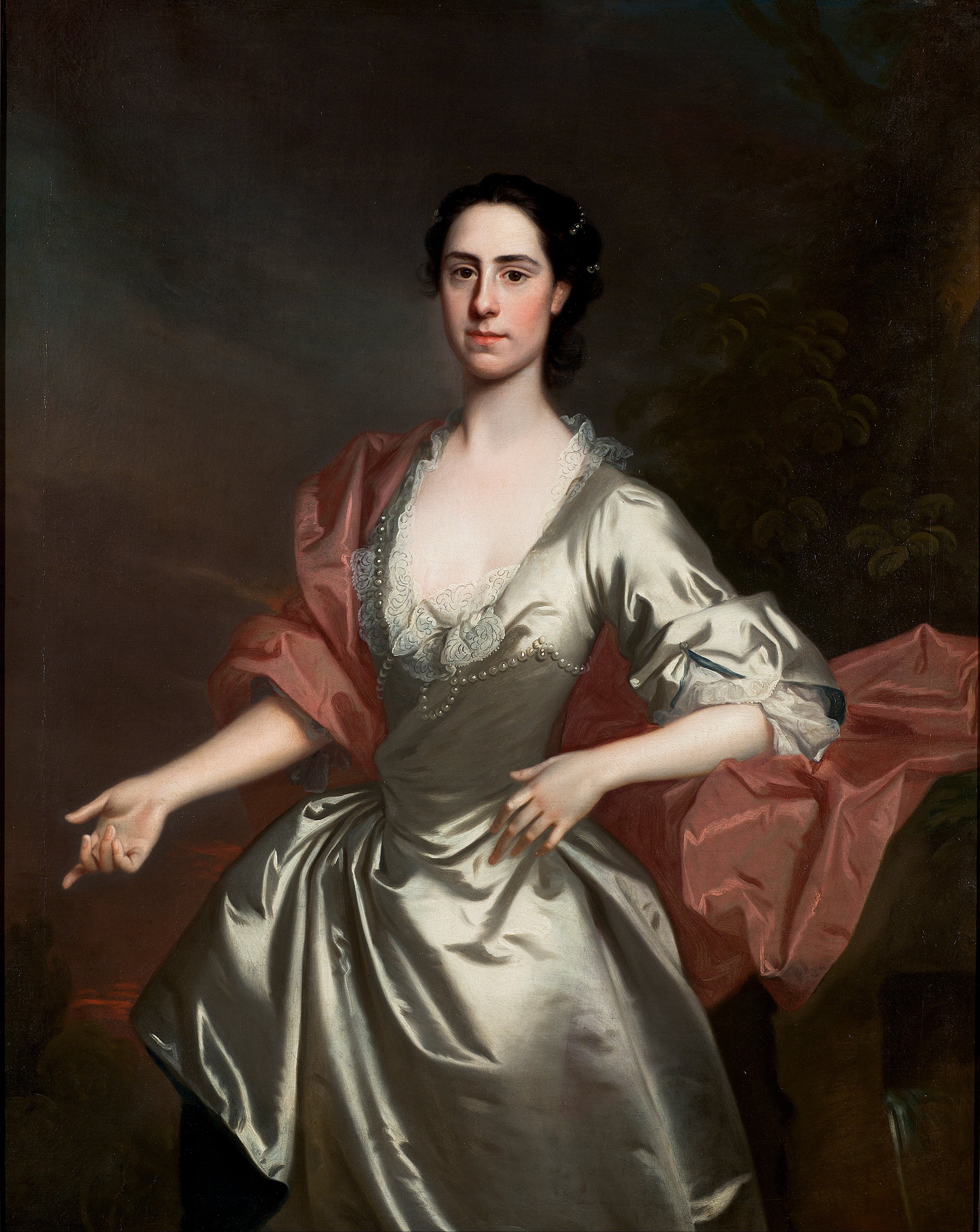
Lady Susanna Campbell, née Bernard (d. 1751), painting by Allan Ramsay.

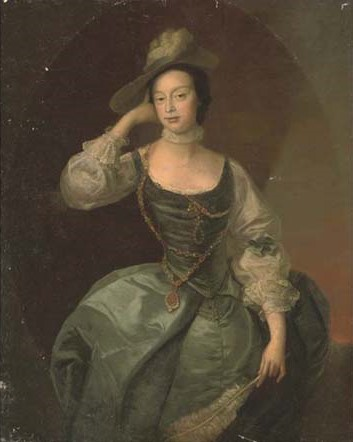
Bridget Bacon, Lady Firebrace, painting by the follower of Thomas Hudson

Parliament of Great Britain
Preceded by Daniel Campbell	Member of Parliament for Glasgow; 1734–1741	Succeeded by Neil Buchanan
