= James Campbell (of Burnbank and Boquhan) =

Scottish noble, kidnapper and British politician

The Honourable James Campbell (after c. 1660 – c. January 1713) of Burnbank and Boquhan was a Scottish nobleman of Clan Campbell. He was an officer of the Royal Scots Army and then the British Army, and a politician who sat in the Parliament of Scotland from 1699 to 1702 and as a Whig in the British House of Commons from 1708 to 1710.

He is also notable for an incident of bride kidnapping. In 1690 in London, 30-year-old Campbell abducted and married the 13-year-old granddaughter of an unamused Thomas, Lord Wharton. A notorious scandal ensued. Campbell stole away to Scotland, evading punishment.

== Family and early life ==
Campbell was the fourth son of Archibald Campbell, 9th Earl of Argyll and his first wife Lady Mary, daughter of James Stuart, 4th Earl of Moray. He was educated at the University of Glasgow.

During the Monmouth Rebellion in 1685, Campbell was held in preventive detention in Edinburgh Castle. His father played a leading role in the rising, for which he was later executed.

Campbell joined the army in 1689 as a captain in his brother's regiment, the Earl of Argyll's Regiment of Foot.

== Forced marriage ==
Scandal erupted in 1690 when Captain Campbell, aided by Sir John, son of Sir William of Johnston (who had served in King William's War and as a captain at the Battle of Boyne), and by Archibald Montgomery, abducted and married a young heiress in London. The teenaged Mary Wharton was heir to her father Philip Wharton of Goldsborough Hall in North Yorkshire, who had died in 1685. On her 13th birthday, Mary had come into an annual income of £1,500, equivalent to £315,000 in 2025.

On 10 November 1690, Mary was lured outside from the home she shared with her great-aunt on Great Queen Street, Westminster, where the three men forced her into a six-horse coach and took her off to the coachman's house. There, she was forcibly married to Campbell, without her consent, and without the presence of her legal guardian Robert Byerley, the son of her great-aunt. By order of the Lord Chief Justice, the marriage was annulled and Mary was returned to her guardian within two days, to whom she was wed two years later. Sir John was then arrested and indicted for the abduction on 11 December, convicted by jury, and hanged at Tyburn on 23 December 1690. Reputedly a "nasty piece of work", Johnston had previously been involved in a similar elopement with a Miss Magrath in County Clare, Ireland and had subsequently been imprisoned in Dublin as a debtor. He was also alleged to have committed rape in Utrecht.

However, the real culprit was Campbell, who had lured the impoverished Johnston with money, but escaped scot-free. Abduction and forced marriage was an ancient custom in the Scottish Highlands, but in London Campbell was regarded as lucky to have escaped the hangman's noose.

Mary Wharton and James Campbell Marriage Annulment Act 1690
- Act of Parliament
- Parliament of England
- Long title: An Act to annul and make void a Marriage between Mary Wharton an Infant and James Campbell Esquire.
- Citation: 2 Will. & Mar. Sess. 2. c. 9 Pr.
- Territorial extent: England and Wales

Dates
- Royal assent: 20 December 1690

Status: Current legislation

The marriage was annulled on 20 December 1690 by the Parliament of England, which passed a private act of Parliament: the Mary Wharton and James Campbell Marriage Annulment Act 1690 (2 Will. & Mar. Sess. 2. c. 9 Pr.). Campbell's older brother, the 10th Earl of Argyll and later 1st Duke of Argyll, had unsuccessfully petitioned against the annulment.

In 1692, Mary was married to her guardian, Robert Byerley. She died in 1727, having had two sons and three daughters. Campbell remarried in 1694 to Margaret Leslie, daughter of General David Leslie, 1st Lord Newark. They had two sons and three daughters.

== Politics ==
Campbell subscribed £500 to the Darien scheme in 1696. His relationship with his brother faltered during the 1690s, but had recovered sufficiently by 1699 that Campbell was elected in the Argyll interest to Parliament of Scotland, as a burgh commissioner for Renfrew. In 1702 he became a director of the Bank of Scotland.

The first Duke of Argyll died in 1703, and was succeeded by his son John Campbell, 2nd Duke of Argyll. At the 1708 British general election Campbell was chosen by his nephew, the second Duke, as his candidate for the Ayr District of Burghs of Ayr, Irvine, Rothesay, Inveraray and Campbeltown. The 1st Earl of Bute, who controlled Rothesay, acquiesced in the choice and made James Campbell a burgess of Rothesay to allow him to be appointed as the burgh's commissioner for the election. Argyll controlled Inverary and Campbeltown, so with three of five burghs backing James Campbell, a challenge would have been futile. He was returned unopposed as a Whig.

By the time of his election in 1708 Campbell had taken and then left another commission in the army, probably as colonel of a foot regiment. His efforts in 1709 to secure reinstatement to the army failed, and neither appeals to the Duke of Marlborough nor the lobbying of his nephew Argyll were enough to win him a new commission. He was not prominent in Parliament but supported Dr Sacheverell’s impeachment in 1710.

Campbell gave up his Parliamentary seat at the 1710 general election, when his nephew gave the seat to the London-based Scottish physician Charles Oliphant.

== Death and legacy ==
Campbell probably died in January 1713, leaving two sons and two surviving daughters. His main heir was his eldest son John Campbell, although his younger son and a daughter were served as heirs to their portions of his estate in 1738.

Parliament of Scotland
Preceded by Patrick Houston	Burgh Commissioner for Renfrew; 1699–1702	Succeeded by Colin Campbell of Woodside
Parliament of Great Britain
New constituency	Member of Parliament for Ayr Burghs; 1708 – 1710	Succeeded by Charles Oliphant
