= Daniel Campbell (died 1753) =

Scottish merchant, slave trader and politician

Daniel Campbell (c. 1671 – 1753) was a Scottish merchant, slave trader and politician who sat in the British House of Commons representing the constituency of Clyde Burghs from 1716 to 1734. He was nicknamed "Great Daniel" due to his weight and personal fortune.

== Dates ==
Campbell was the eldest son of Walter Campbell of Skipnish, and was born about 1671. In many books of reference he is stated to have been born in 1696 and to have died in 1777, the former date being that of his son John Campbell's birth, and the latter that of his grandson Daniel Campbell's death.

== Merchant ==
At the age of 22 he set up business in New England, before settling in Glasgow, where he traded tobacco for iron ore. He also engaged in the slave trade and in finance. He was very successful as a merchant, and in 1707 purchased the estate of Shawfield or Schawfield, in Rutherglen, from Sir James Hamilton. He also came to possess the valuable estate of Woodhall, near Holytown.

== Member of Parliament ==
A follower of the Duke of Argyll, he represented Inverary in the Scottish parliament from 1702 till the union, and was one of the commissioners who signed the treaty. He also sat in the first Parliament of Great Britain, 1707–8, and represented the Glasgow burghs from 1716 to 1734. In 1711 he built, for his town residence in Glasgow, Shawfield mansion, which became famous in connection with the Shawfield riots in 1725.

== The Shawfield Riots and the purchase of Islay ==
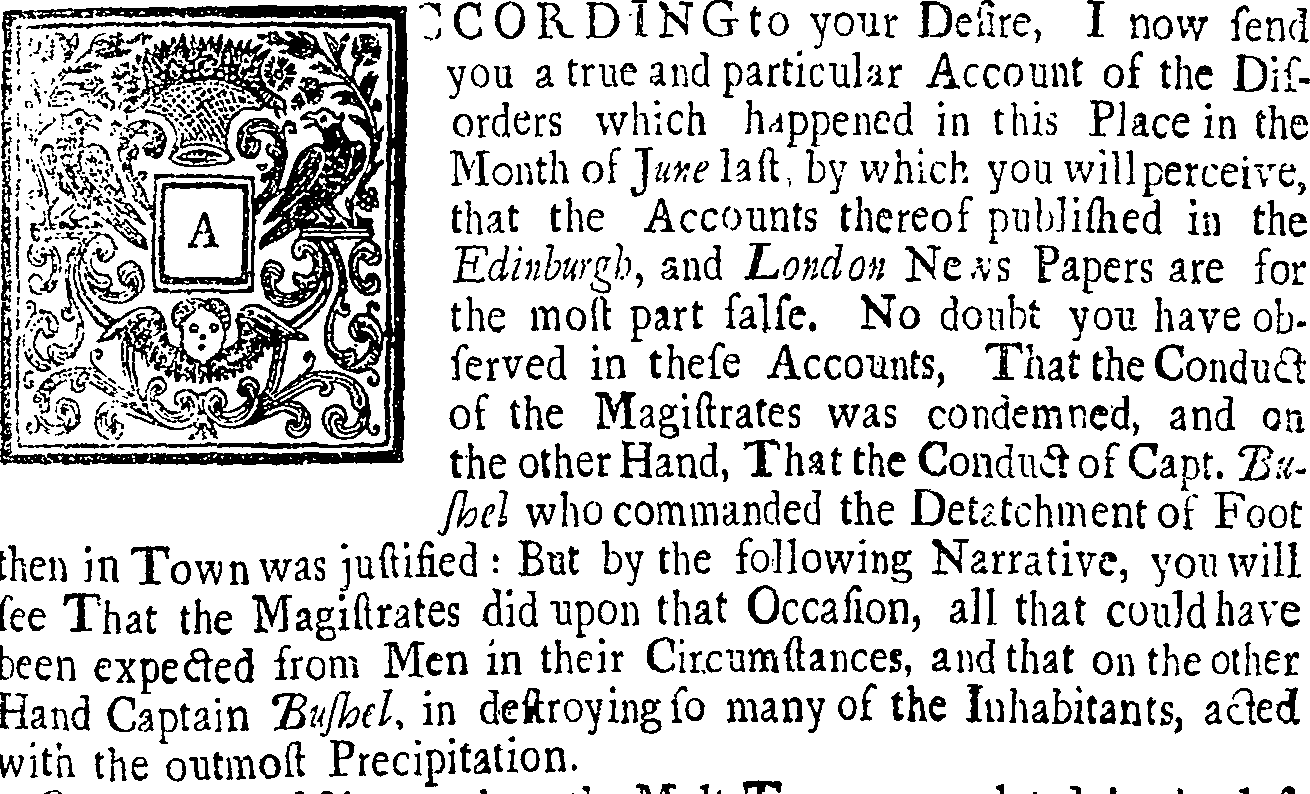
A letter from a gentleman in Glasgow, to his friend in the country, concerning the late tumults which happened in that city.

Campbell had voted for the imposition of the malt tax in Scotland, and on this account the mob, after taking possession of the city and preventing the officers of excise from collecting it, proceeded to the Shawfield mansion and completely demolished the interior. The provost and magistrates were arrested on the ground of having favoured the mob, and Campbell received £9,000 from the city as compensation for the damages caused by the riot. Soon afterwards he purchased the island of Islay, the sum obtained from the city forming a large part of the money paid for it.

== Family ==
Campbell died on 8 June 1753, aged 82. By his first marriage to Margaret Leckie (the daughter of John Leckie of Newlands) he had three sons and three daughters, and by his second to Catherine Denham one daughter. On his death, having been pre-deceased by his eldest son, he was succeeded by his grandson, Daniel Campbell of Shawfield and Islay (c 1737–1777). Another grandson was Walter Campbell of Shawfield.

Campbell died on 8 June 1753, aged 82. "By his first marriage to Margaret Leckie (the daughter of John Leckie of Newlands) he had three sons and three daughters. His sons all died before him. After Margaret's death in 1711 he married Katherine Erskine in 1714, herself a widow, and had another daughter." "Daniel the Younger inherited the Islay estates from his grandfather in 1753, when he was just 16 years old and legally a minor. Daniel was laird until his death in 1777." "The Round Church, Bowmore 1767/68 was built as part of Daniel Campbell's new village at Bowmore." "When Daniel the Younger died aged forty, in 1777 his brother Walter inherited the island and continued the process of integration with the mainland and their improvements, begun by great Daniel. The family as a whole worked indefatigably for improvements in education, religion, agriculture, industry and administration."

== Biography ==
Campbell's biography A very canny Scot was written by Joanna Hill and Nicholas Bastin, and published in 2007.

== Notes ==
Parliament of Great Britain
Preceded by Thomas Smith	Member of Parliament for Clyde Burghs; 1716 – 1727	Succeeded by John Blackwood
Preceded by John Blackwood	Member of Parliament for Clyde Burghs; 1728 – 1734	Succeeded by William Campbell
