= John Blackwood (art dealer) =

Scottish merchant (died 1777)

John Blackwood (2 October 1696 – 12 November 1777) was a Scottish merchant who early in his life was a slave trader in New Spain and a politician who sat in the House of Commons briefly from 1727 to 1728. Later he became a noted and sought-after art dealer. He was based in London but travelled widely on the Continent, and was one of the first dealers to introduce the works of Murillo to Britain.

== Biography ==
Blackwood was born in Edinburgh on 2 October 1696, and baptised two days later, a younger son of Sir Robert Blackwood of Pitreavie, a rich silk merchant and one-time (1711-1712) Lord Provost of Edinburgh, and Jannet Glas (variously spelled).

Records suggest that in 1716 Blackwood was indentured to Robert Aston, a merchant in London, although there is nothing to confirm this was the right John Blackwood.

Blackwood initially set out on a political career, and at the 1727 British general election, he was returned as Member of Parliament for Glasgow in a contest. However, on 28 March 1728, the Commons awarded the seat to his opponent, Daniel Campbell, on the merits of the return. Blackwood presented a petition which was referred to the elections committee, who reached no decision. The petition was renewed in 1730 and 1731 but never resolved. He did not stand again.

Blackwood's first known business venture was to set up as a merchant, in partnership with John Cathcart in 1726 in London, at Nag's Head Court, Gracechurch Street. There were illicit and authorised aspects to their enterprise.

The more lucrative source of income for the two merchants came from an illicit trade in wood via Kingston, Jamaica. They traded products of British industrial manufacture for the logwood that the Spanish cut, while silencing the royal officers of the province with a bribe of twelve per cent.

They were also licensed by the South Sea Company to engage in the slave trade in Campeche, Yucatán, in particular to bring 199 slaves into Campeche in 1730-33, at forty pieces of eight for each negro they imported. Interestingly, John Howberry, aged 13, a negro servant to John Blackwood, was baptised in England on 10 August 1740.

This enterprise continued until 1739, when the war with Spain broke out. There was not time to remove their effects and so they made a great loss from this and from the non-payment of debts owing to them. John Cathcart accepted a commission from Lord Cathcart to become Director of the Hospital in the Expedition to the West Indies, based in Cuba, then under the Lord Cathcart's command. The hope was John Cathcart could recover a considerable proportion of the debts and effects, and so restore health to the partnership. Meanwhile, Blackwood was in London looking after the stock and effects of the company.

Cathcart worked hard during his three years in the West Indies and recovered £600 of outstanding debts; he also paid more than £360 of his own earnings to help offset the losses, and a further £2,092 when back in London. But this was still insufficient, and the company was declared bankrupt on 19 August 1745.

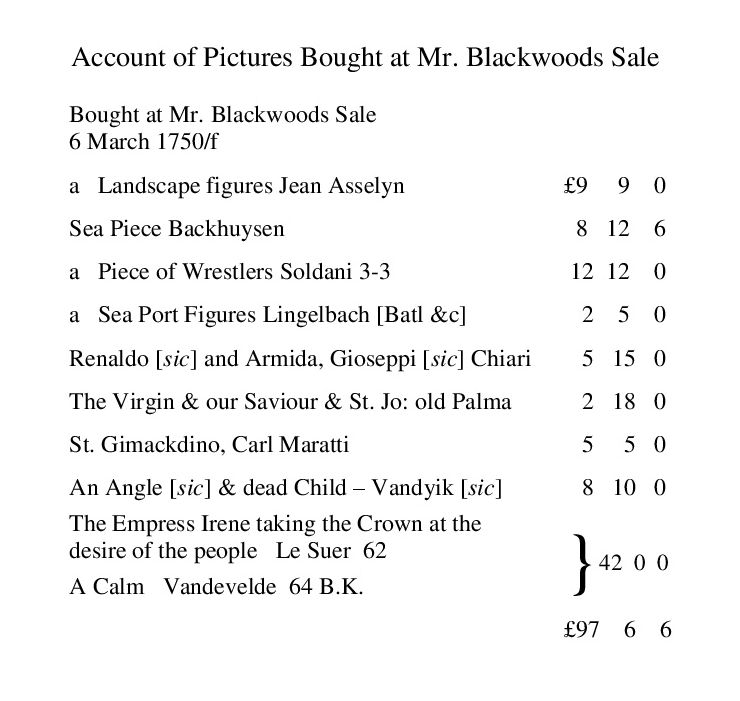
Account from John Blackwood to Sir Lawrence Dundas in 1750

It is not clear how, or exactly when, but at some stage Blackwood became interested in art and started dealing in paintings and sculptures. This was probably in the late 1730s or early 1740s, before the bankruptcy, and when money would have been available from the timber business.

According to the Apollo journal, Blackwood “travelled extensively on the Continent, assembled a sizeable collection there and then returned to London to dispose of it at leisure from their own homes or through the auction rooms”. He bought paintings by, and often directly from, artists who are now world-famous, but who were less well known in eighteenth century England. Samuel Ireland, the English engraver and art dealer reported in 1796 that the late Mr Blackwood had purchased a room full of Cuyp’s work some thirty years earlier “for seven or eight pounds a piece”.

John Blackwood was one of the first British dealers to purchase the paintings of Murillo, who was especially collected by Sir Lawrence Dundas. Blackwood undertook several commissions for Dundas during which time they came friends. Murillos of this provenance are now in galleries around the world, e.g. The Vision of Saint Francis of Paola in the J. Paul Getty Museum in Los Angeles. Denys Sutton has given a full description of Dundas's collection.

Several auctions of the art works he acquired were held in Blackwood's lifetime. A two-day sale by Mr Langford at his house in the Great Piazza, Covent Garden in March 1760 featured about 120 paintings, many by eminent artists, as well as bronzes and other items.

=== Family and property ===
John Blackwood married Anne Shovell, daughter of Sir Cloudesley Shovell at St Luke's, Old Charlton, Kent on 28 July 1726. They had a daughter, Mary, and two sons: Shovell and John. Shovell married Katherine Ambrosia, daughter of Albert Borgard in 1761. Mary married Thomas Desaguliers on 18 March 1745 at St George's Chapel, Mayfair.

Property in Crayford, Kent which once belonged to Sir Cloudesley Shovell eventually passed to his daughter Anne and her husband John Blackwood. They included "Howbery, Marshal's-place, the iron mills, a farm, called Wantsum, and other lands".

John Blackwood died on 12 November 1777 while visiting Dundas at his home at Moor Park. He was buried a week later at St Paulinus Church, Crayford, Kent.

Two auctions of Blackwood's property give a measure of how much he had personally amassed in his life. On 21 February 1778, Messrs. Christie and Ansell auctioned his "much distinguished, and valuable collection of pictures, fine bronzes, sepulchral urns, bustos, etc." More than forty painters were listed, including Velazquez, Poussin, Rubens, Rembrandt and Cuyp. Later that year a two-day auction was held of "The Improved Lease of the Genteel House, with convenient Offices, double Coach-House, and Stabling for Five horses, situated on the east side of Soho-square", together with furniture, wines and pictures.

Parliament of Great Britain
Preceded by Daniel Campbell	Member of Parliament for Glasgow; 1727– 1728	Succeeded by Daniel Campbell
