= Charles Campbell (MP for Argyllshire) =

Scottish Whig politician and British Army officer

Charles Campbell (c.1695–1741), of Auchnacreive, was a British Army officer and Scottish Whig politician who sat in the House of Commons from 1736 to 1741.

Campbell was the second son of Hon. John Campbell of Mamore and brother of General John Campbell and William Campbell. He joined the army and was an ensign in the 12th Foot in 1726. He was in the 3rd Foot Guards in 1728 and became captain in the 15th Foot in. 1733.

Campbell was returned at a by-election on 27 April 1736 as Member of Parliament for Argyllshire on the interest of his first cousin, John Campbell, 2nd Duke of Argyll. Following his cousin’s lead, he went into opposition and voted against the Spanish convention in 1739. He was returned again at the 1741 British general election.

In 1741, Campbell became a major in Robinson’s Marines and a lieutenant-colonel in the 61st Foot. He died unmarried in Jamaica on service on.8 October 1741.

Parliament of Great Britain
Preceded by Sir James Campbell, 2nd Baronet	Member of Parliament for Argyllshire; 1736–1741	Succeeded by James Stuart-Mackenzie
