= Ardkinglas =

Country house in Argyll and Bute, Scotland

Coordinates: 56°15′00″N 4°57′02″W

Ardkinglas House
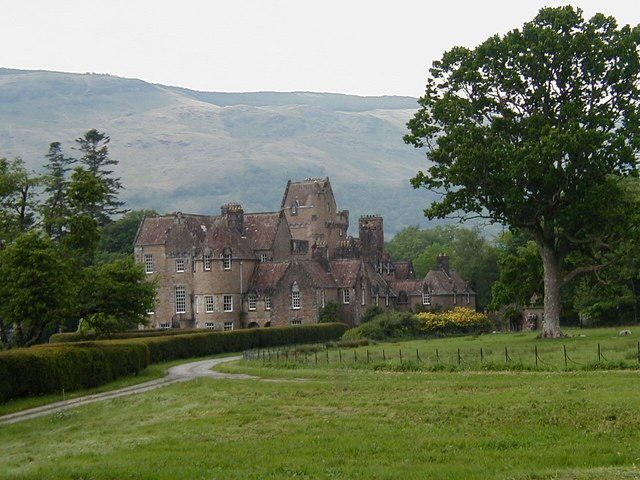
- Interactive map of Ardkinglas House
- Location: near Cairndow, Argyll and Bute, Scotland

History
- Built: 1906-1908

Site notes
- Architect: Sir Robert Lorimer
- Architectural style: Scottish baronial style
- Owner: David Sumsion

Listed Building – Category A
- Official name: Ardkinglas House
- Designated: 20 July 1971
- Reference no.: LB13786

Inventory of Gardens and Designed Landscapes in Scotland
- Official name: Ardkinglas and Strone
- Designated: 1 July 1987
- Reference no.: GDL00022

Ardkinglas House is a Category A listed country house on the Ardkinglas Estate in Argyll, Scotland. The estate lies on the eastern shore of Loch Fyne, and the house is located close to the village of Cairndow. Dating back to the 14th century and originally a Campbell property, the estate now covers more than 12,000 acres (4,900 ha) of rolling hills and landscaped parkland. The centre of the estate was Ardkinglas Castle until this was replaced by a new house in the 18th century. This house was itself replaced by the present Ardkinglas House in the early 20th century, designed by Sir Robert Lorimer for Sir Andrew Noble. It remains the property of the Noble family, and is open to the public on a limited basis. The woodland gardens are open all year round.

== Estate history ==
=== Ardkinglas Castle ===
Ardkinglas Castle is thought to date from the 14th century. It was built in the form of a quadrangle around an inner courtyard measuring 98 feet (30 m) in each direction. There were large turrets on three of the corners, to the front there was a large gate tower with two flanking defensive turrets. Ardkinglas became the home of a new line of the Campbell family when Sir Colin Campbell granted it to his son Caileen Oig in 1396 “in all its righteous heaths and marches, or as long as woods shal grow and waters flow”.

James VI of Scotland made James Campbell of Ardkinglas comptroller and in February 1584 "general searcher" of customs of the West Sea, with powers to apprehend ships with forbidden cargoes.

On 23 March 1679, Colin Campbell of Ardkinglas was made a baronet. His son Sir James Campbell, 2nd baronet, (died 1752) sat in the Parliament of Scotland from 1702 and, following the Union of Scotland and England, in the Westminster Parliament until 1741. He purchased the Dunderave estate around 1700, and was succeeded by his grandson, Lt.Col. Sir James Livingston-Campbell, son of his eldest daughter Helen.

By 1769 the castle was reported destroyed.

=== The first Ardkinglas House ===
During the 18th century the Campbells commissioned designs for a new house at Ardkinglas from some of the leading architects of the day, including Colen Campbell, Robert Adam and James Playfair. None of these designs were built, and the house constructed in 1795 has been described as "rather dull". This house was destroyed by fire in 1831 and, despite further designs from architects including William Burn and Alexander Binning, the family moved into the stable block which was adapted as the main house.

In 1810, when Sir Alexander Livingston-Campbell died, Ardkinglas was inherited by his cousin James Callander of Craigforth, who subsequently changed his name to Campbell and adopted the style of a baronet, although he was not entitled to do so.

In April 1905 the estate of 49,000 acres (77 sq mi) was offered for sale in two lots. Lot 1, the Loch Fyne section comprised 34,400 acres including the mansion house, deer forest, grouse moors and salmon and sea trout fishing in the Fyne and Kinglas rivers. Lot 2 was the Loch Goil and Loch Long section was contained about 14,600 acres and included the village of Lochgoilhead.

=== The present house ===
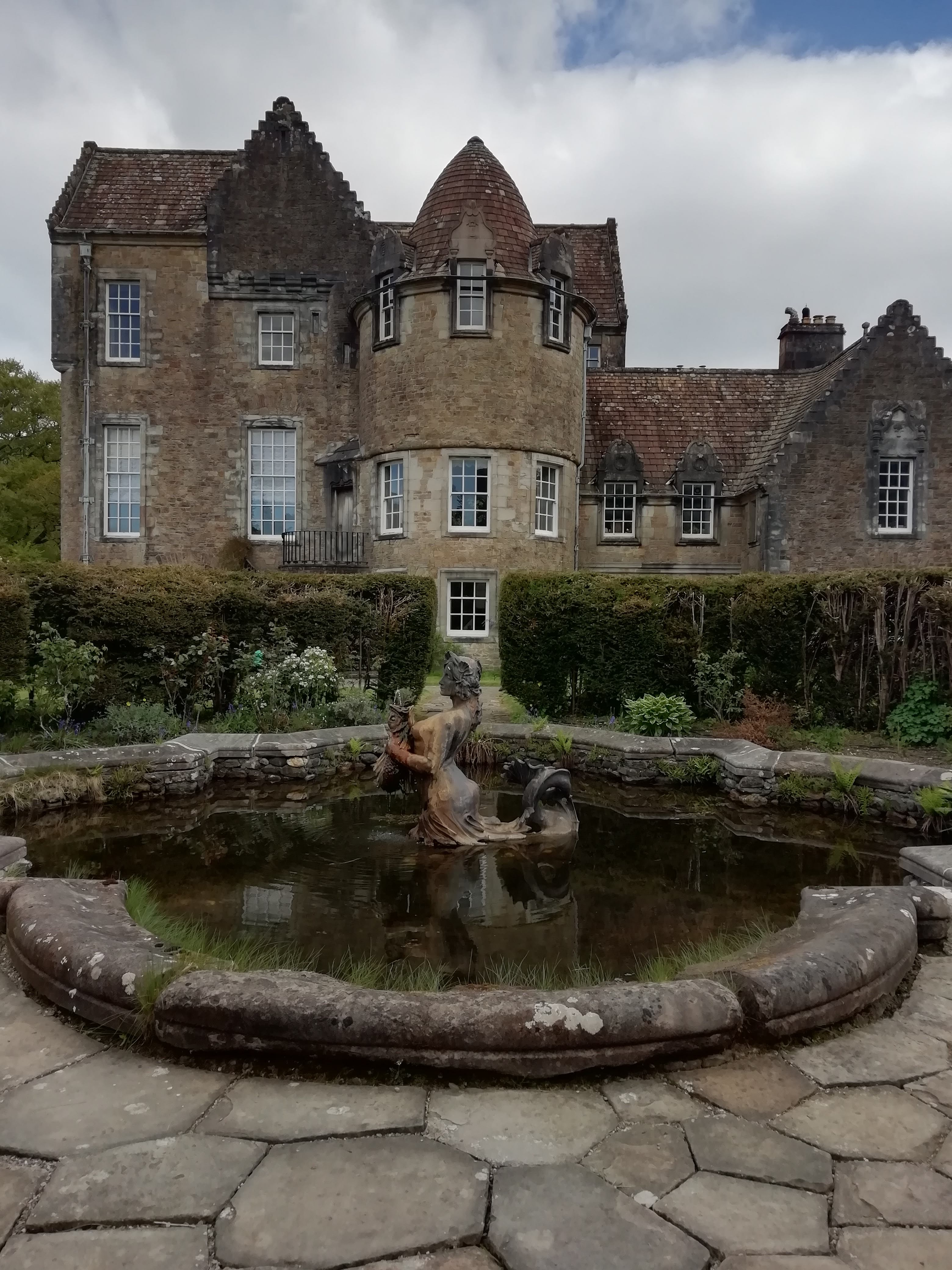
The house in 2019

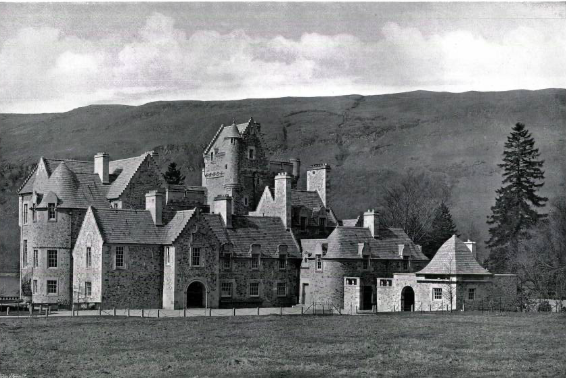
The entrance front 1911

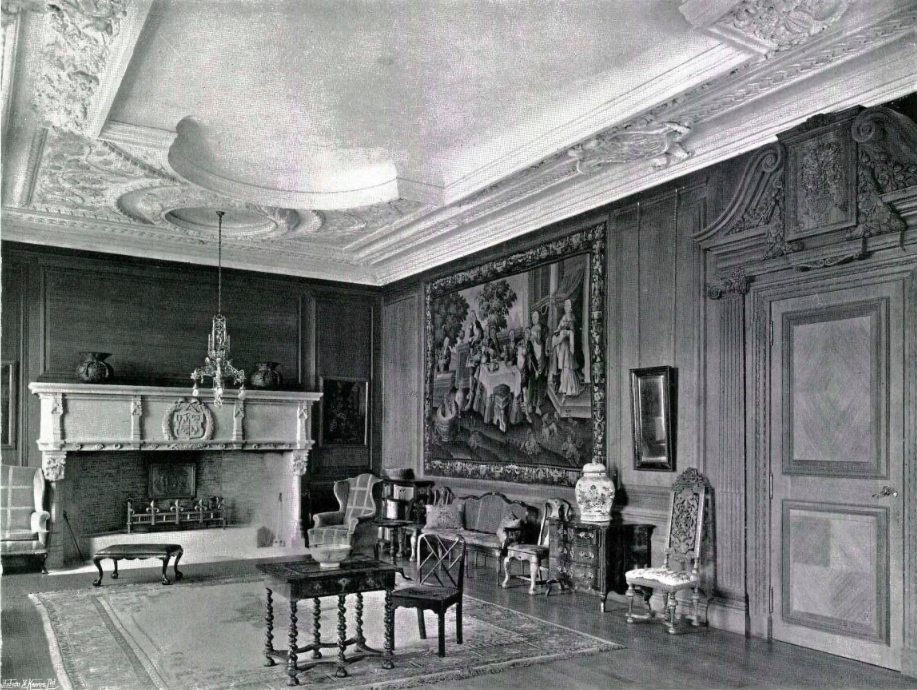
The Saloon 1911

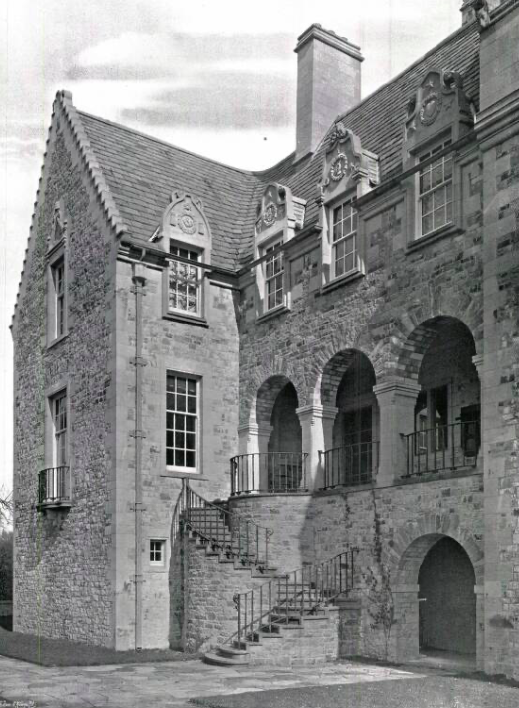
Staircase from loggia to garden 1911

In 1905 Ardkinglas was purchased by Sir Andrew Noble, an expert on ballistics and gunnery who was chairman of Lord Armstrong's artillery works in Newcastle. Ardkinglas House was designed by architect Sir Robert Lorimer, and construction began in May 1906. Although Noble's deadline for completion of 1 August 1907 was not met, the house was fully completed in 21 months. The house was lit with electricity powered from a hydro-electric plant on the estate. A dam was built on the river Kinglas and a building erected nearby to hold the generating equipment.

The house is built of local granite with a greenish hue, patched with gold, sourced locally from the blue whinstone prevalent at the loch side. The dressed quoins were sourced from a quarry at Dullatur, and the slates from Caithness.

Apart from the local granite, all of the building materials had to be transported to site. A new quay was built on the loch side for this purpose.

The ground floor included a porch, lower hall, men’s room for smoking and billiards, and an oval room used by Sir Andrew Noble as an office, servants quarters’ and deer larder. These rooms were grouped around an open courtyard providing light and ventilation. The principal rooms were set on the first floor. For access to the gardens, Lorimer provided an external staircase on the north-west side which leads from the loggia down to the garden level, and another on the south-west. On the first floor, the corridor provided access to the morning-room and great saloon, the fireplace within containing a single granite slab lintel of over 5 tons which was carved by Mr. Morgan of Aberdeen. A panel in the saloon contains a painting of a chariot and rearing horses by Roger Fry. The great saloon was 40 feet (12 m) by 30 feet (9.1 m). In its south-west corner a secret door in the panelling provided access to a lobby leading to a spiral staircase to the garden. The first floor also contained the loggia, dining room and principal bedrooms. A second floor above was entirely devoted to bedrooms. The male servants were quartered on the ground floor in the north west corner, with the female servants on the first floor in the east corner. The great kitchen was only used when the family were in residence, the scullery being adequate when only servants required meals. Outside the dining room were two pantries and a plate safe, with a lift from the kitchen below.

As Sir Andrew Noble was a noted scientist, he installed a complete set of meteorological and electrical recording instruments which connected with apparatus in the castellated tower and in the terrace below.

John Noble inherited the estate in 1972, and began farming oysters in the loch. In 1988 he opened the first Loch Fyne Oyster Bar, now a national chain. The house has been used as a filming location for television series, including The Crow Road, The Diplomat, and films including The Water Horse: Legend of the Deep.

It is open to the public, although not on a regular basis. The house's original "Butler's Quarters" can be rented out.

== Ardkinglas Gardens ==
The Woodland Gardens, dating back to the 18th century, are open year-round with views of the exterior of Ardkinglas House and its backdrop onto Loch Fyne. The Arboretum was planted in the 1860s-70s by the Callander family and has some specimens of large trees. One of these trees a Grand Fir (Abies grandis) held the record for many years as "The Tallest tree in Britain", another tree a Silver Fir (Abies alba) is described as the "Mightiest Conifer in Europe" with a trunk girth of over 31 feet (9.4 m).

== Ardkinglas Railway ==
Ardkinglas Railway
Overview
- Locale: Scotland
- Dates of operation: 1866–late 1890s
- Successor: Abandoned

Technical
- Track gauge: 12 in (305 mm)
- Length: 1 mile

The Ardkinglas Railway was a 12 in (305 mm) narrow gauge estate railway built to serve the Ardkinglas Estate, former seat of Sir James Campbell, 2nd Baronet, of Ardkinglass, on the shores of Loch Fyne. The railway ran along the shore of the loch from a boat house at Caspian. The railway was built as a transportation system for the estate and as a garden toy for the estate's 17th Laird, George Livingston-Campbell-Callander. A single steam locomotive operated the line; rolling stock consisted of a two-seat open passenger carriage and several wagons. The railway had been dismantled by 1897 and the equipment sold. The boiler from the locomotive was still in situ on the beach at Tayvallich on Loch Sween until the early 1950s.

== See also ==
- Ardgoil
- British narrow gauge railways
