= Rutherglen (Parliament of Scotland constituency) =

Constituency of the Old Parliament of Scotland

Rutherglen in Lanarkshire was a royal burgh that returned one commissioner to the Parliament of Scotland and to the Convention of Estates.

After the Acts of Union 1707, Rutherglen, Dumbarton, Glasgow and Renfrew formed the Glasgow district of burghs, returning one member between them to the House of Commons of Great Britain.

== List of burgh commissioners ==
- 1661, 1665 convention, 1672–74, 1678 convention: David Spens
- 1667 convention: Andrew Pinkerton, bailie
- 1669–70: James Riddell (dismissed for malversation, 1671)
- 1689 convention, 1689–1702: John Scott, maltman
- 1702–07: George Spens, provost

== See also ==
- List of constituencies in the Parliament of Scotland at the time of the Union
