= Sir Colin Campbell, 1st Baronet, of Ardkinglass =

Sir Colin Campbell, 1st Baronet (c. 1640–1709), of Ardkinglass, Argyllshire, was a Scottish politician who sat in the Parliament of Scotland from 1693 to 1702.

Campbell was the son of James Campbell of Ardkinglass, Argyllshire and his wife Mary Campbell, daughter of Sir Robert Campbell of Glenorchy, Perthshire. He married Helen Maxwell, daughter of Sir Patrick Maxwell, of Newark. He was created baronet on 23 March 1679. In 1684, he was imprisoned on an unfounded suspicion of high treason, The family seat was Ardkinglas Castle, which stood on the shore of Loch Fyne, Argyllshire, Scotland. The castle was built in the form of a quadrangle around an inner courtyard measuring 98 ft in each direction. There were large turrets on three of the corners and to the front was a large gate tower with two flanking defensive turrets. It was surrounded by beautiful gardens and parkland and the vast Ardkinglas estate.

Campbell was returned as Shire Commissioner for Argyllshire in 1693, and remained in Parliament until 1702.

Campbell died in April 1709. He was succeeded in the baronetcy by his son James.

Parliament of Scotland
Preceded by Sir Duncan Campbell; Sir John Campbell	Shire Commissioner for Argyll; 1693–1702; With: Sir Duncan Campbell; Sir John Campbell	Succeeded by Sir James Campbell, 2nd Baronet; Sir James Campbell
Baronetage of Nova Scotia
New creation	Baronet (of Ardkinglass); 1679–1709	Succeeded by James Campbell
