= Malt tax riots =

Protests against a tax in Scotland and England

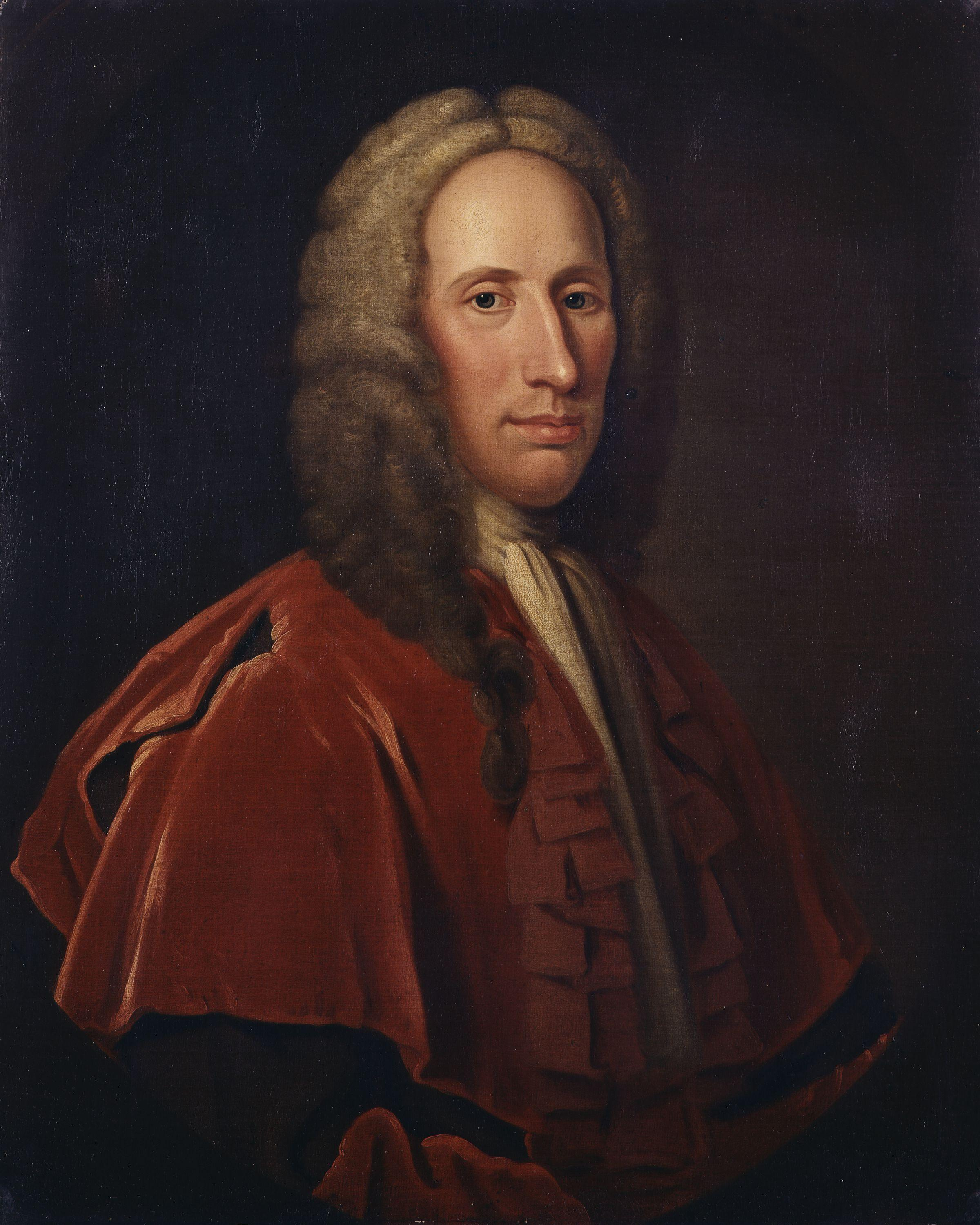
Duncan Forbes, 5th of Culloden, the Lord Advocate, accompanied George Wade and his force when they suppressed the Riots in Glasgow.

The malt tax riots were a wave of protest against the extension of the English malt tax to Scotland. The riots began in Hamilton on 23 June 1725 and soon spread throughout the country. The fiercest protests, the Shawfield riots, were in Glasgow, but significant disturbances occurred in Edinburgh, Stirling, Dundee, Ayr, Elgin and Paisley.

The Lord Advocate, Robert Dundas, an opponent of the imposition of the malt tax on Scotland, published an anti-malt tax pamphlet and was sacked. General Wade was appointed to quell the protests and several rioters were killed or transported. However, the British government was forced to make concessions, and the riots led to the establishment of the Board of Trustees for Manufacturers and Fisheries in 1727.

== Background ==
A duty on malt had been imposed in England to raise funds for war after the 1725 Treaty of Hanover. At the union with Scotland in 1707, most taxes were made uniform, but under the Treaty of Union Scotland was given a temporary exemption from the malt tax, until the end of the war.

An extension of the Malt Tax to Scotland was proposed in 1713 but abandoned in the face of opposition. By the 1720s the British Government was attempting to reform the Scottish taxation system. This climate of political turmoil promoted George Drummond by 1723. In 1725, the House of Commons applied a new malt tax which applied throughout Great Britain, but charged at only half the rate in Scotland. Scots were unused to this tax, which increased the price of beer. Enraged citizens in Glasgow drove out the military and destroyed the home of Daniel Campbell, their representative in Parliament, who had voted for the tax. In Edinburgh, brewers went on strike, illegally. Andrew Millar, then a book trade apprentice, helped overthrow attempts by Edinburgh magistrates to control dissemination of opinion during the unrest by printing opposition material in Leith, outside the council of Edinburgh's jurisdiction. The pamphlet to which Millar refers in the letter to Robert Wodrow dated 10 August 1725, and his actions detailed in the letter dated 15 July, emphasised contemporary doubts and challenges to the strike's "illegality".

== See also ==
- Porteous Riots, 1736
- Daniel Campbell
