= Sir Dugald Campbell, 1st Baronet =

Scottish landowner (died 1641)

Sir Dugald Campbell (died 1641) was a Scottish landowner.

He was a son of Sir Duncan Campbell, captain of Castle Sween and his wife Mary MacLeod, daughter of William MacLeod of Dunvegan.

== Career ==
He was heir to his estate before 1599. In November 1601 the courtier Roger Aston wrote that Campbell of Auchinbreck was one of the greatest followers of the Earl of Argyll and his standard bearer, able to command 500 Highland followers. He raided Bute in 1602, and in May the Earl of Argyll was made to take hands with the Steward of Bute as a show of friendship at the baptism of Duke Robert.

He was knighted by James VI and I in 1617. He was created a baronet, of Nova Scotia in 1628. MacPhail wrote (p. 65): “...(Dugald) was by King’s Charter 1st created Knight Baronet of Nova Scotia... (He received a charter wherein there are many privileges) “...dated at Whitehall, London 12 January 1628. He seems to have been knighted at an earlier date".

Dugald Campbell died during a fire at Auchinbreck Castle in 1641.

== Marriages and family ==
Dugald Campbell married three times, (1) Catherine Scrimgeour (1570–1590), a daughter of James Scrimgeour of Dudhope (2) in 1590, Mary Erskine, daughter of Alexander Erskine of Gogar, and sister to Sir Thomas Erskine, (3) Dame Isabel Boyd, daughter of Lord Boyd. She was born about 1574.

His children with Mary Erskine included:

- Sir Duncan Campbell, 2nd Baronet of Auchinbreck
- Florence Fingwel Campbell, or Fionnghal Chaimbeul, who married Iain Garbh Maclean of Coll. She wrote a Gaelic lament on the battle of Inverlochy where her brother was killed.

Baronetage of Nova Scotia
New creation	Baronet (of Auchinbreck); 1628–1641	Succeeded by Duncan Campbell
