= Auchenbreck Castle =

- Kilmodan, Argyll and Bute, Scotland

Site information
- Type: Castle
- Condition: No longer standing.

Location
- Location within Argyll and Bute
- Coordinates: 55.984641°N 5.1739443°W
- Grid reference: NS 02100 81400

Auchenbreck Castle (also spelt Auchinbreck) is located in Argyll and Bute, Scotland. Its remains are situated in Kilmodan parish, near the south of Glendaruel, 9 kilometres (5.6 mi) north of Tighnabruaich on the Cowal peninsula. Little remains of the castle, other than a flat rectangular platform, around 35 by 18 metres (115 by 59 ft), between Auchenbreck farmhouse and the Auchenbreck Burn. This is partially bounded by a revetment wall up to 2.2 metres (7 ft 3 in) high.

== History ==
The castle was held by the Campbells of Auchinbreck, a branch of the Clan Campbell descended from Duncan, a younger son of Duncan Campbell, 1st Lord Campbell. He was granted lands near Dunoon in 1435, and further lands in Glassary. By the 16th century, the family were known as "of Auchinbreck".

The castle appears on Timothy Pont's map of the late 16th century. Dugald Campbell of Auchenbreck was killed in a fire at the castle in 1641. Around 1703 the castle was purchased by John Fullarton, former minister of Kilmodan, and later Bishop of Edinburgh. Fullarton renamed the estate Greenhall, and was the last person to live in the castle. When the estate was sold in 1728, after Fullarton's death, it included a mansion which may have been built from the stones of the castle. The castle itself was in its current ruined state by 1870.
