= Tobias Bauchop =

Tobias Bauchop or Baccup (c.1665 – 1710) was a 17th-century Scottish master mason responsible for several architectural masterpieces, mainly working as contractor to the eminent architect Sir William Bruce.

== Life ==
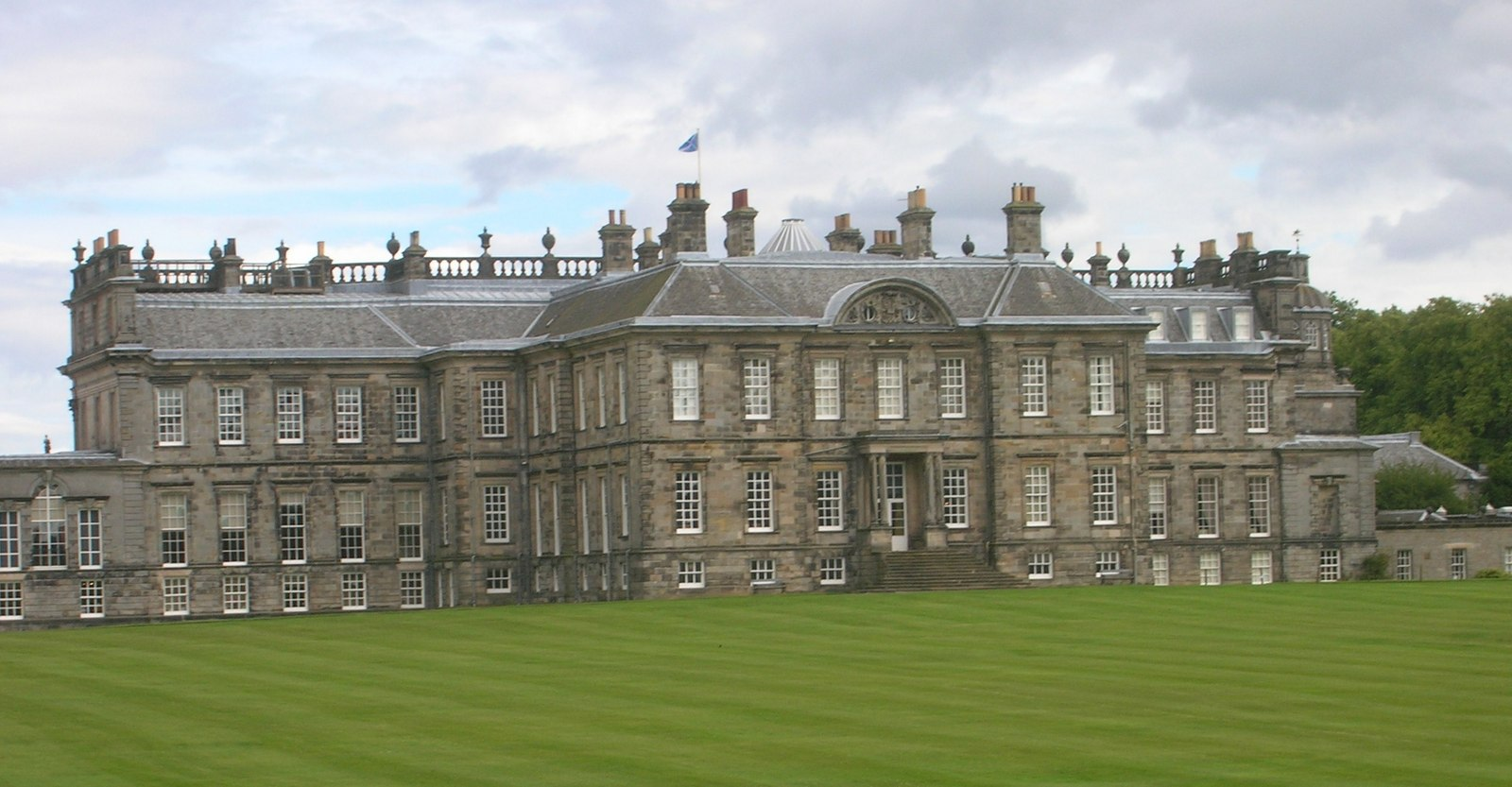
Hopetoun House

He was born around 1665 in Alloa in central Scotland, the son of Thomas Bauchop (b. 1639), a master mason and bridge builder, and his wife, Janet Meerson (b. 1650).

He was apprenticed to his father and took over his projects from at least 1680. From 1685 he had a working relationship with Sir William Bruce, Scotland's foremost architect of the day. From around 1695, he apprenticed Alexander Edward to provide working drawings for his projects. From 1699, Bruce, Bauchop and Edward jointly worked on the huge Hopetoun House project.

He died in Alloa on 26 April 1710.

Bauchop's house in Alloa survives, including its marriage stone with a devil's head. It was restored by the National Trust for Scotland.

== Known works ==
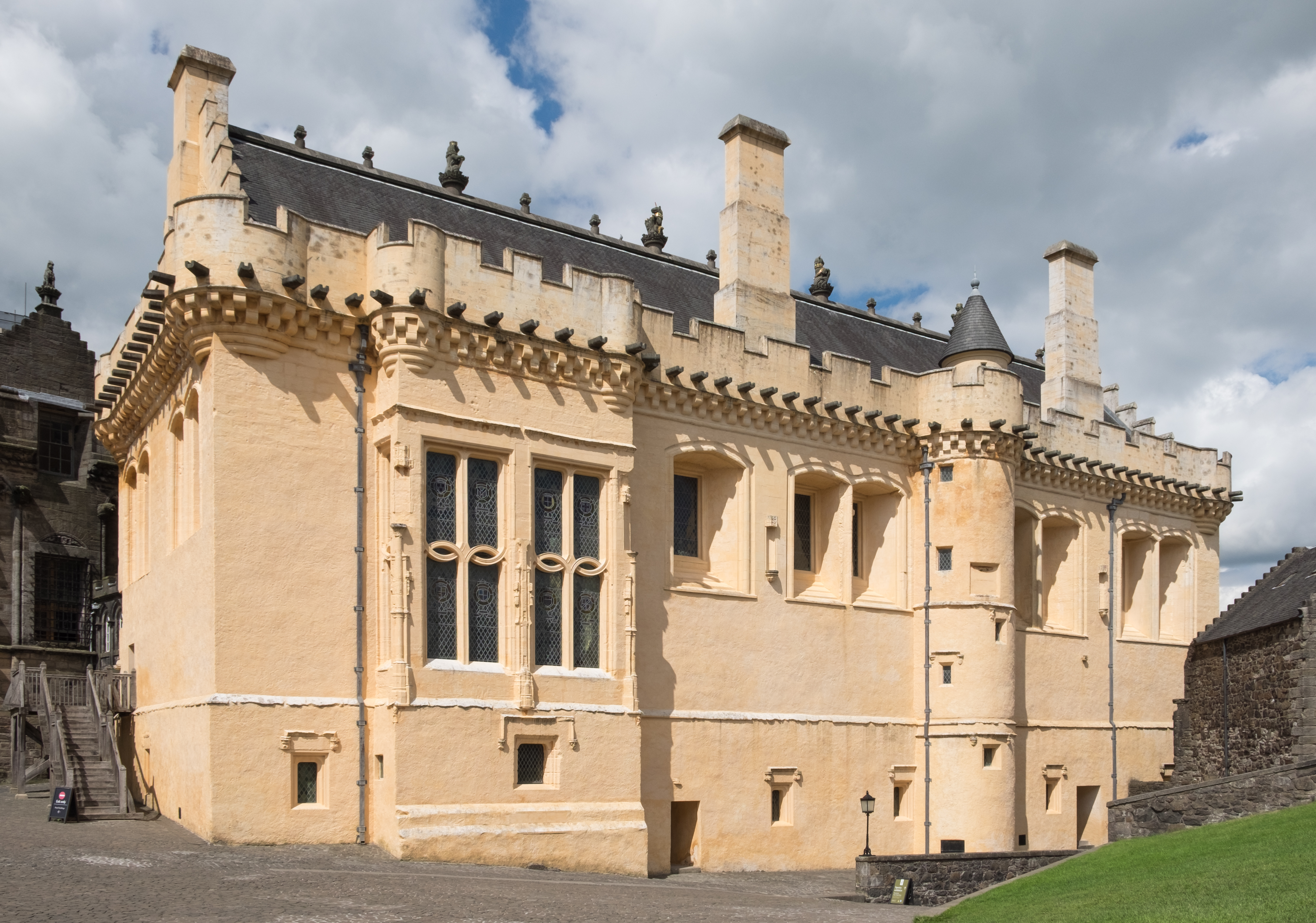
Great Hall at Stirling Castle

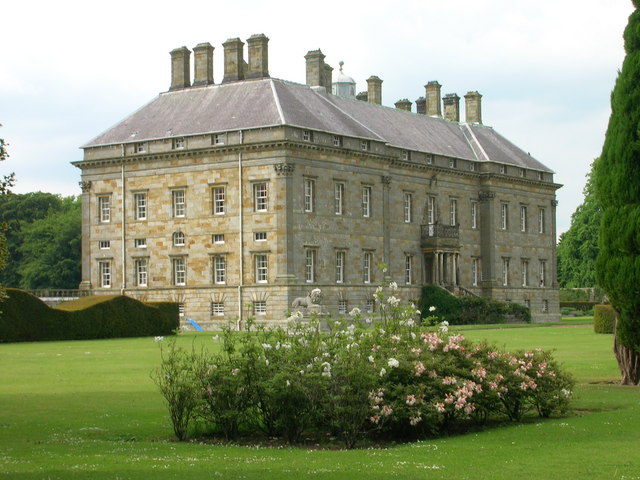
Kinross House

- Remodelling of Alloa Kirk (1680) including the church spire
- Logie Kirk (1684)
- Kinross House for Sir William Bruce (1685–87)
- Kinross Home Farm (1686)
- Remodelling of Argaty House (1687)
- Three Gun Battery, Stirling Castle (1689)
- Market Cross, Alloa (1690)
- House for himself Star House, 25 Kirkgate, Alloa (1695)
- Cortachy Castle (1696)
- Kinloch House, Meigle (1697)
- Memorial to Provost McCulloch, Church of the Holy Rude, Stirling (1698)
- Craigiehall near Edinburgh (1699) for William Johnstone, 2nd Earl of Annandale and Hartfell
- Mansion for Sir John Shaw, 3rd Baronet of Greenock (1702)
- Mertoun House with Bruce (1703)
- Dumfries Town Hall (1705)
- Hopetoun House with Bruce
- Duke of Montrose's house, Drygate, Glasgow (1708)
- Remodelling of the Great Hall at Stirling Castle (1710)

== Family ==
He was married to Margaret Lapsley.

He had a son Tobias Bauchop (1673-1719) and grandson Tobias Bauchop (1719-1746).
