= Alexander Edward =

Alexander Edward (10 June 1651 – 16 November 1708) was a priest of the Scottish Episcopal Church who later became a draughtsman, architect and landscape designer. He was a stylistic follower of Sir William Bruce, and planned several gardens in the grand French axial manner.

== Early life ==
Alexander Edward was the eldest son of Robert Edward, minister at Murroes in Angus, who was related by marriage to the Maule family, and as such enjoyed the patronage of the Maule Earls of Panmure. Alexander's diary records that his family had to hide from Cromwell's Puritan troops in the 1650s, and also that he had a squint. He graduated from the University of St Andrews in 1670.

Edward was not ordained until 1679, and his activities during the 1670s are unknown. At this time, his father was writing a description of Angus, and preparing a map to accompany the book, entitled Angusia, Provincia Scotiae. The work was commissioned by George Maule, 2nd Earl of Panmure, and published in 1678. John Lowrey has suggested that Alexander assisted with Angusia, acquiring skills as a draughtsman and cartographer. Lowrey also speculates that he may have come into contact with Sir William Bruce at this time, as Bruce designed new gates for Panmure House in 1672.

Edward was one of the pallbearers at the funeral of Archbishop Sharp, the churchman murdered by Presbyterian Covenanters in 1679. From 1681 he was minister of Kemback in Fife, until 1689 when he was deprived of his parish as a non-juror, following the establishment of the Presbyterian Church of Scotland. Despite this, he was still minister in 1694, despite his manse being attacked by a mob in 1691.

== Architectural works ==
In around 1685, apprenticed to the Alloa master mason Tobias Bauchop, he prepared plans and elevations of Kinross House, designed by the King's architect Sir William Bruce as his own country house. He worked as Bruce's draughtsman again on an unexecuted scheme for the house and gardens of Kinnaird Castle, Angus. He drew up plans for Melville House in Fife, where Bruce was also involved, and where James Smith served as main contractor and designer. In 1699, he made a drawing of Falkland Palace for its keeper, the 2nd Marquis of Atholl.

Edward's first architectural commission came from James Maule, 4th Earl of Panmure, for the reconstruction of Brechin Castle as a country seat, on which he worked from 1696 to 1708. This remains his only known substantial work, and shows the stylistic influence of William Bruce. In 1700, he was involved in the building of Rossie House in Angus for Patrick Scott (now demolished), and he also oversaw interior works at Kellie Castle, Angus, another Maule property. He may have been responsible for the designs of Careston Castle, which was extended from an L-plan to a symmetrical U-plan shape in 1702. He made a survey of the Castlestead or Nether Palace at Falkland Palace. In 1704, he designed the monument to John Murray, 1st Marquess of Atholl in Dunkeld Cathedral.

== Travels to Europe ==
He was sent on a fact-finding mission in 1701–02 by a group of Jacobite-leaning nobles, led by the Earls of Mar and Panmure. Edward was charged with visiting country seats in England, including Chatsworth and Castle Howard, before meeting various well-known craftsmen in London. He was then to travel to Paris and the low countries, visiting Versailles, Marly and St Cloud. His main aim was to collect material on the most up-to-date architectural styles, as well as observing land improvements, water works, mines and other projects. He bought plans, made sketches and took notes, building up a large collection of material, which several of his patrons attempted to secure on Edward's death. Another, more secret, purpose to his journey was to convey coded letters from the Duke of Hamilton to James Stuart, the "Old Pretender", at his court-in-exile at Saint-Germain.

== Landscape gardening ==
Edward assisted William Bruce with the layout for the gardens at Hopetoun House, as well as at Kinross. In 1708 Edward prepared drawings for the "Great Design" of the landscape around Hamilton Palace, for Duchess Anne Hamilton. The enormous scheme included plantations, forest rides, and mounds in the shape of the cinquefoils of the Hamilton arms. It was never fully realised, due to the deaths of Edward that year, and of Anne in 1716, and due to the expense of the proposals. However, the Nethertoun area of Hamilton was demolished, and a great avenue laid out, later terminated by William Adam's Chatelherault.

== Death ==
Alexander Edward died in Edinburgh, and was buried in Greyfriars Kirkyard. The antiquary Robert Sibbald described him as a "great master in architecture, and contrivance of avenues, gardens and orchards".
