= Kinross-shire (Parliament of Scotland constituency) =

Constituency of the Old Parliament of Scotland

Before the Acts of Union 1707, the barons of the shire of Kinross elected commissioners to represent them in the unicameral Parliament of Scotland and in the Convention of the Estates.

== History of the constituency ==
The small barons and freeholders were first authorised to elect "commissioners of the shire" to represent them in Parliament by an act of King James I in 1428; the sheriffdom of Kinross was to be represented by one commissioner. This act, however, remained inoperative, and the representation of the shires was not established until 1587.

For many years the majority of Kinross-shire was owned by the Earl of Morton and the Lord Balfour of Burleigh, who already sat in Parliament as peers. There was therefore no commissioner for the shire, except during the Commonwealth of England, Scotland and Ireland when the sheriffdoms of Fife and Kinross were jointly represented by one Member of Parliament at Westminster from 1654 to 1659. This situation continued until the 1670s when Lord Morton's estate of Kinross, comprising most of the shire, was purchased by Sir William Bruce of Balcaskie. Having been elected commissioner, Bruce was allowed to represent the shire according to former custom, by Royal Letter of 13 August 1681.

== List of shire commissioners ==
- 1681–82 and 1685–86: Sir William Bruce of Kinross
- 1689 convention and 1689–1690, 1700–1702: Sir David Arnot of Arnot
- 1702–07: John Bruce of Kinross

== After the Union ==
The commissioner for Kinross, John Bruce (son and later heir of Sir William) was chosen as one of the Scottish representatives to the first Parliament of Great Britain, sitting from 1707 until the general election of 1708. After 1708 Kinross-shire and Clackmannanshire were alternately represented by one Member of Parliament in the House of Commons of Great Britain.

== See also ==
- List of constituencies in the Parliament of Scotland at the time of the Union
