= Charles Hope, 3rd Marquess of Linlithgow =

British peer and businessman (1912–1987)

The Most Honourable The Marquess of Linlithgow MC
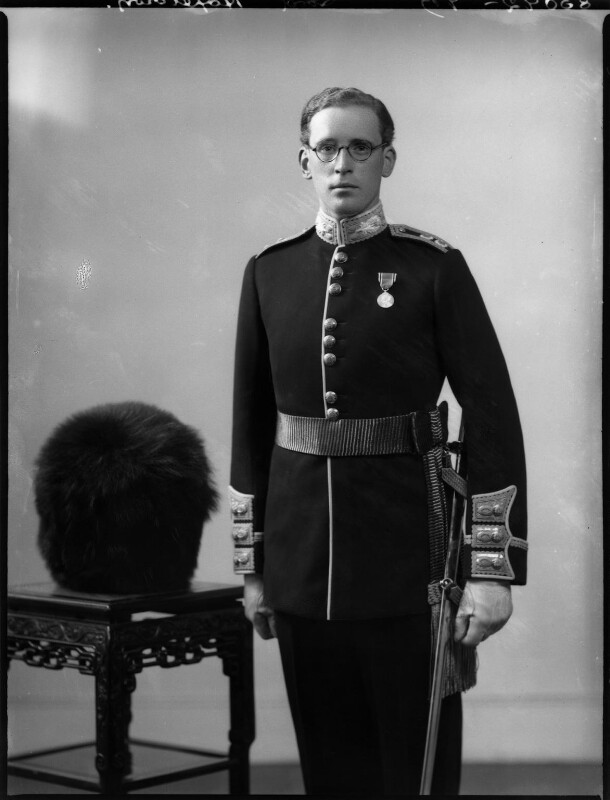
- Charles William Frederick Hope, 3rd Marquess of Linlithgow

Personal details
- Born: 7 April 1912
- Died: 7 April 1987 (aged 75) Westminster, London, England
- Spouses: Vivien Kenyon-Slaney (m. 1939; died 1963) Judith Lawson (m. 1965)
- Children: 2, including Adrian Hope, 4th Marquess of Linlithgow
- Parent: Victor Hope, 2nd Marquess of Linlithgow
- Relatives: John Hope, 1st Baron Glendevon (twin brother)
- Education: Eton College; Christ Church, Oxford (B.A., 1936)

Military service
- Allegiance: United Kingdom
- Branch/service: British Army
- Rank: Captain
- Unit: 51st (Highland) Division
- Battles/wars: World War II: Battle of Dunkirk

Charles William Frederick Hope, 3rd Marquess of Linlithgow MC (7 April 1912 – 7 April 1987) was a British peer and businessman. He was the son of Victor Hope, 2nd Marquess of Linlithgow, and elder twin brother of John Hope, 1st Baron Glendevon. Hope received his education at Ludgrove School and Eton College, respectively.

During the Second World War, with the 51st (Highland) Division, Lord Hope was awarded the Military Cross for his valour and service. He was taken prisoner in 1940 at Dunkirk and sent to Colditz Castle. After the war, Lord Hope entered the world of finance and became a director of Eagle Star Insurance.

In 1974, Lord Linlithgow established the Hopetoun House Preservation Trust with the express purpose of preserving his ancestral home, Hopetoun House, as a national monument. Since that time, it and its collection of historical artifacts, which include furnishings, paintings, manuscripts, and other relics of interest, have been carefully maintained under the guidance of the Trust. The house has also been improved by the Trust to facilitate public openings and educational use, and thus has given considerable enhancement to Scotland's cultural heritage, promoting a better understanding of its history.

== Early years ==
The son of Victor Hope, 2nd Marquess of Linlithgow. He was the elder twin brother of John Hope, 1st Baron Glendevon. His first wife, Vivien Kenyon-Slaney, daughter of Major Robert Orlando Rodolph Kenyon-Slaney, died on 23 September 1963. He later married Judith Lawson, daughter of Stanley Matthew Lawson, in 1965.

He was educated at Ludgrove School and Eton College. Lord Hope fought in WWII and received the Military Cross for his service. He was a member of the 51st (Highland) Division. In 1940, he was taken prisoner at Dunkirk and held at Colditz Castle.

After the war he went into finance and was a director of Eagle Star Insurance.

In 1974, Lord Linlithgow created The Hopetoun House Preservation Trust to ensure Hopetoun House and the estate were preserved for future generations.

== Marriages and children ==
Lord Linlithgow was married twice. His first marriage was to Vivien Kenyon-Slaney, daughter of Major Robert Orlando Rodolph Kenyon-Slaney and Lady Mary Cecilia Rhodesia Hamilton, on 24 July 1939. The couple had two children together.

- Lady Mary Sarah-Jane Hope (25 May 1940 – 8 November 2012); married Michael Gordon Learoyd, son of Philip Halkett Brook Learoyd, on 3 October 1967. The couple had one son and were divorced in 1978.
- Adrian John Charles Hope, 4th Marquess of Linlithgow (born 1 July 1946)

Lady Linlithgow died on 23 September 1963. Lord Linlithgow married, secondly, Judith Lawson, daughter of Stanley Matthew Lawson, on 15 February 1965.

He died on his 75th birthday on 7 April 1987, and was succeeded in the marquessate by his son, Adrian.

Peerage of the United Kingdom
Preceded by Victor Alexander John Hope	Marquess of Linlithgow; 1952–1987	Succeeded by Adrian John Charles Hope
