= William Adam (architect) =

Scottish architect, mason, and businessman

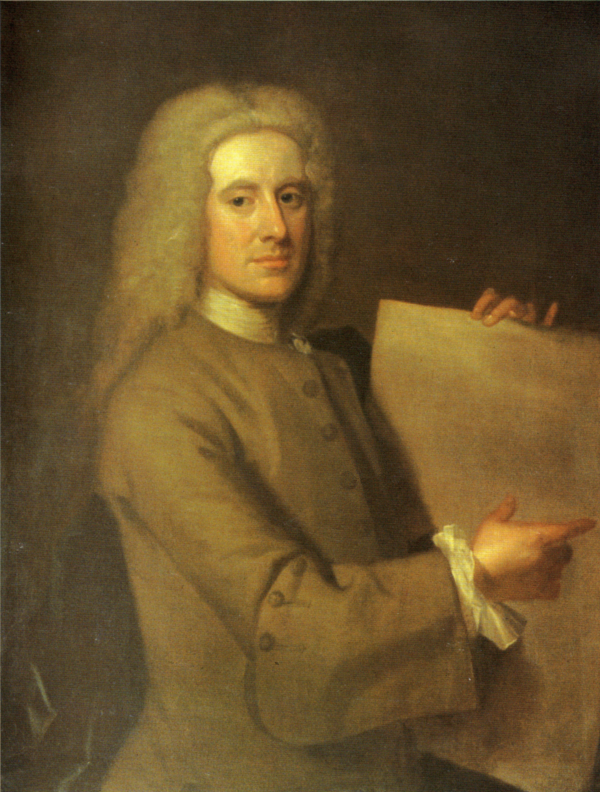
- Portrait by William Aikman, 1727
- Born: October 1689; Linktown of Abbotshall, Fife, Scotland
- Died: 24 June 1748 (aged 58)
- Occupation: Architect
- Spouse: Mary Robertson
- Children: at least 10, including John, Robert and James
- Buildings: Hopetoun House; Mavisbank House; Arniston House; Duff House; Pollok House
- Projects: Inveraray Castle

William Adam (1689 – 24 June 1748) was a Scottish architect, mason, and entrepreneur. He was the foremost architect of his time in Scotland, designing and building numerous country houses and public buildings, and often acting as contractor as well as architect. Among his best known works are Hopetoun House near Edinburgh, and Duff House in Banff. His individual, exuberant style built on the Palladian style, but with Baroque details inspired by Vanbrugh and Continental architecture.

In the 18th century, Adam was considered Scotland's "Universal Architect". However, since the early 20th century, architectural critics have taken a more measured view, Colin McWilliam, for instance, finding the quality of his work "varied to an extreme degree". As well as being an architect, Adam was involved in several industrial ventures and improvement schemes, including coal mining, salt panning, stone quarries and mills. In 1731 he began to build up his own estate in Kinross-shire, which he named Blair Adam. He was the father of three architects; John, Robert and James, the last two were the developers of the "Adam style".

== Biography ==
=== Early life ===
William Adam was born in Linktown of Abbotshall, now a neighbourhood of Kirkcaldy, Fife, and was baptised on 24 October 1689. He was the only surviving child of John Adam (d. c. 1710), a mason, and Helen Cranstoun, daughter of William Cranstoun, 3rd Lord Cranstoun. His paternal grandfather was Archibald Adam, a laird in Angus. Adam probably attended the grammar school in Kirkcaldy until 1704, when he turned 15, and thereafter learned the craft of masonry, possibly from his father. It is often suggested that Adam was apprenticed to Sir William Bruce at Kinross House, although the dates make this unlikely. John Fleming suggests that if Adam trained under Bruce at all, it must have been at Hopetoun House which Bruce was building from 1699 to 1703. By 1717 Adam was a fully qualified member of the Kirkcaldy masons' guild, and before 1720 he travelled to France and the Low Countries, visiting country houses and viewing the canal at Ostend.

In 1714, Adam entered into a partnership with William Robertson of Gladney, a local laird, to set up a brickworks at Linktown. The venture was successful, and Adam has been credited with introducing the manufacture of Dutch pantiles into Scotland. On 30 May 1716, Adam married Robertson's daughter Mary, and the couple moved into his home, Gladney House, at Abbotshall.

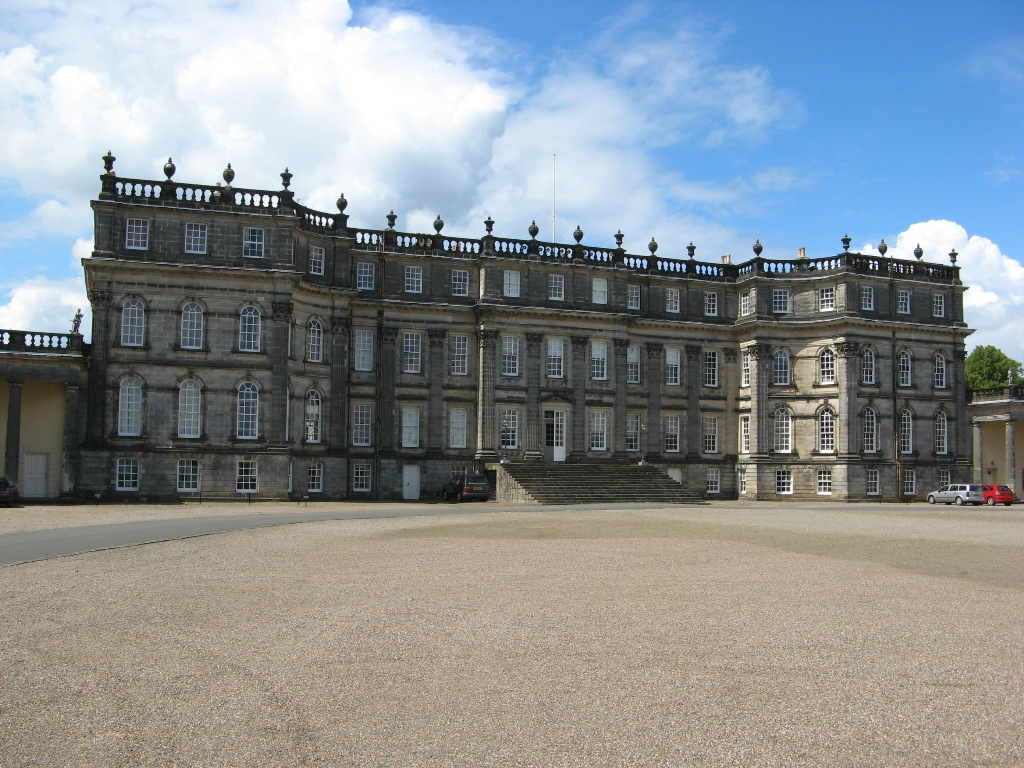
East front of Hopetoun House, designed and built by William Adam over a period of over 20 years

=== Rise to fame ===
It is not known how William Adam became a successful architect from these beginnings, but by 1721 he was engaged on major projects at Floors Castle, where he executed a design by Vanbrugh, and designing extensions to Hopetoun House. John Gifford links Adam's rise with the retirement of James Smith, the most prominent architect of the early 18th century, who was in his 70s by this time. Like Smith, Adam was a trained mason, had social connections through his family, and had the financial backing of successful business ventures. It was in 1721 that Adam became a Freemason being initiated in The Lodge of Edinburgh (Mary's Chapel), No.1.

However, unlike the Episcopalians Smith and Bruce, Adam was a Presbyterian Whig, in a time of Whig domination of the British government. Scottish Episcopalians were associated with Jacobitism, and as such found little favour with the ruling Hanoverian regime. Sir William Bruce, for example, was imprisoned on at least three occasions between 1693 and his death in 1710, merely on account of his principles. Adam's beliefs were much more acceptable, although he did manage to maintain relations with the exiled Jacobite, and amateur architect, John Erskine, Earl of Mar. Adam's political stance allowed him to acquire influential patrons such as John Dalrymple, 2nd Earl of Stair, and Sir John Clerk of Penicuik, who, besides being his clients, attempted to secure government positions and contracts for him. For example, Sir John Clerk unsuccessfully proposed Adam for city architect under the "Town of Edinburgh Bill", which would have seen him overseeing new public works in the capital. In 1727, Stair tried, again unsuccessfully, to have Adam appointed Surveyor of the King's Works in Scotland, although the following year he acquired the lesser position of Clerk and Storekeeper of the King's Works in Scotland, under the Master of Works Sir John Anstruther. In 1730 Adam was appointed principal Mason to the Board of Ordnance in North Britain.

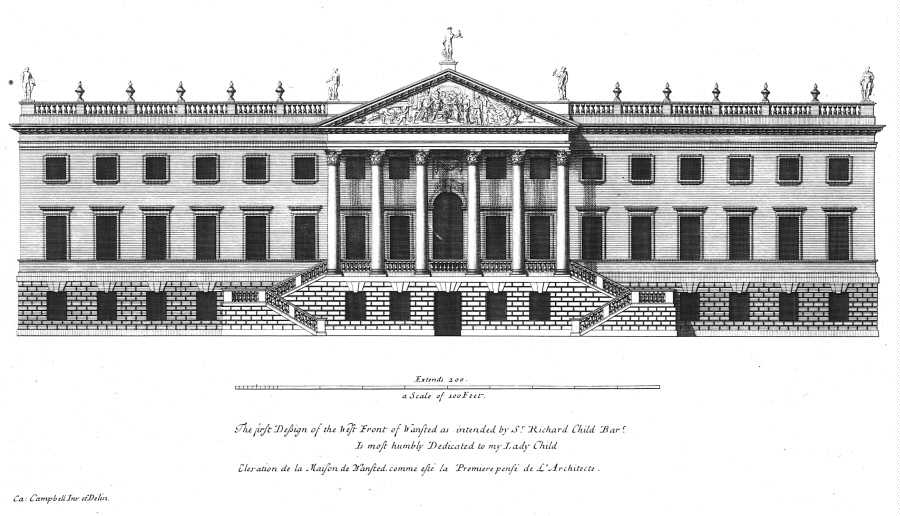
Colen Campbell's design for Wanstead House

In 1727 Adam and Sir John Clerk travelled to London, visiting a number of country seats along the way, including Cliveden, Wilton, and Wanstead House. In London, Adam attempted to make further political contacts, as well as seeking out an engraver for his projected book of architectural plans, which would eventually become Vitruvius Scoticus. Also while in London, he sat to William Aikman for his portrait.

=== Architect, entrepreneur, and laird ===
By 1728, Adam was firmly established as a successful architect with numerous ongoing business concerns, including coal mining, salt panning, quarrying and agricultural improvements, although in that year occurred the death of his partner and father-in-law William Robertson. For the same year, William Adam and Alexander McGill are called architects in the subscribers' list to James Gibbs's Book of Architecture. On 21 February 1728, Adam was made a burgess of Edinburgh, and moved with his family to a property on the Cowgate, where he later built a large tenement.

His business activities continued to expand. Since the commission for Hopetoun in 1721, he had leased quarries near Queensferry which provided the stone for his building contracts. Starting in 1734, he leased lofts, granaries and warehouses in Leith, and leased coal mines and salt pans at Cockenzie, and later at nearby Pinkie he built a canal in 1742–44, to serve the mines. Other engineering works included an aqueduct cut through a hill at Inveresk, and in 1741, an attempt to promote a Forth and Clyde canal, a project eventually realised by others some 30 years later. His main concern from 1731 became Blair Crambeth, the estate in Kinross-shire, near Kelty, which he purchased that year for £8,010 Scots. Renaming the estate Blair Adam, he set about expanding and improving it, planting trees, enclosing land, and setting up coal mines. He established the village of Maryburgh to house the miners, and built a small house, although he seldom visited for any length of time.

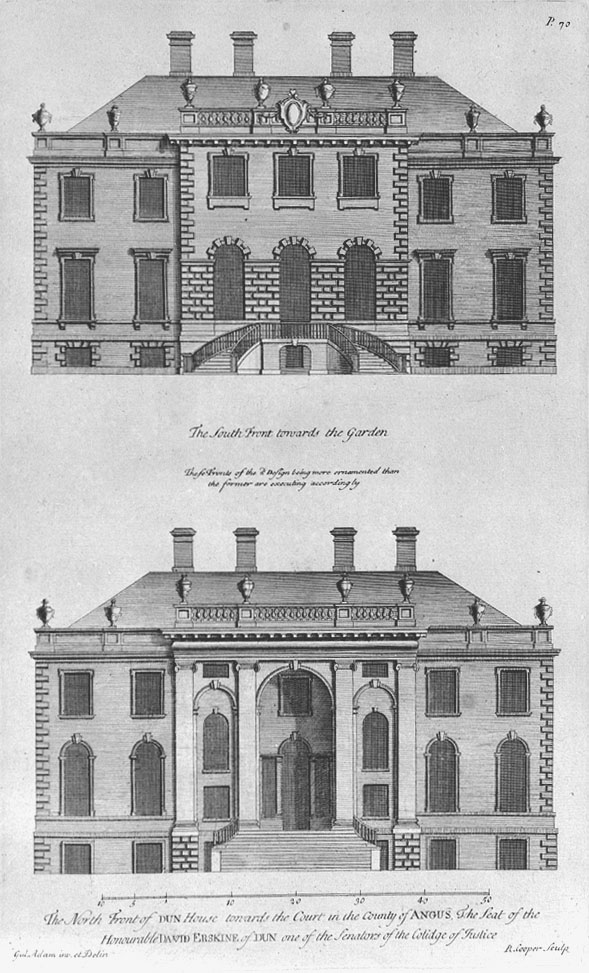
Realised designs for the south front (top) and north front of House of Dun, Angus

=== Later life ===
In 1741 Adam was forced to initiate legal proceedings against William, Lord Braco, to retrieve unpaid fees arising from his work at Duff House. There was no formal contract, and client and architect disagreed on costs for carved stonework. Adam sued for £5,796 12s 11⅓d, and the matter was initially resolved in his favour. However, Braco was a stubborn opponent, and dragged out the proceedings, which were not resolved until just before Adam's death.

After the Jacobite rising of 1745, Adam's position as Mason to the Board of Ordnance brought him a number of large military contracts in the Highlands. In 1746, the position of Master Carpenter to the Board of Ordnance became vacant, and Adam was quick to put forward his son John's name for consideration, although he was unsuccessful in securing him the post. His three eldest sons were all involved in the family business by 1746, James and John both leaving Edinburgh University early to join their father.

William Adam succumbed to illness in late 1747, dying the following summer. He was buried in Greyfriars Kirkyard, Edinburgh, where John Adam designed the family mausoleum built in 1753. This was restored by Edinburgh City Council and Historic Scotland in 1997 to mark the 250th anniversary of his death.

Adam created a personal library at Blair Adam which held a range of over 140 architectural works from Italy, France, Germany, the Netherlands and Britain. Upon his death, he bequeathed his library to his sons.

== Architectural works ==
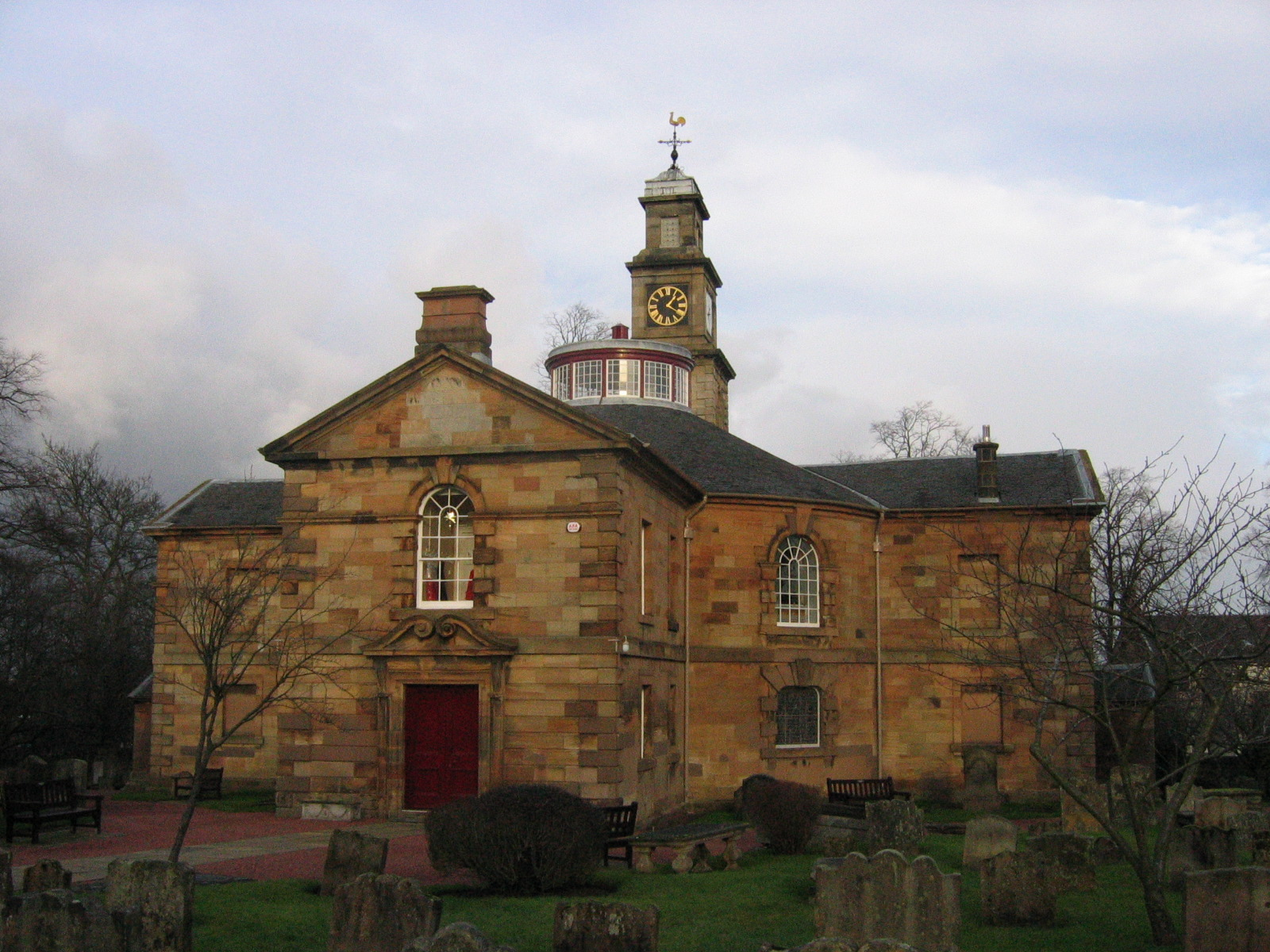
Hamilton Old Parish Church, designed by Adam in 1735

Adam used a wide variety of sources for his designs, and created an inventive personal style of decoration. His chief influences were from English Palladianism, and several of his houses have been likened to designs reproduced in Colen Campbell's Vitruvius Britannicus, but Adam mixed these with English Baroque motifs from Gibbs and Vanbrugh. He relied greatly on a range of French, Italian and English pattern books, including Gibbs' Book of Architecture, from which he borrowed freely with little regard for consistency of style. In addition, he took inspiration from earlier Scottish renaissance architecture, and from his predecessors Bruce and Smith. During his nearly 30-year career as an architect, Adam designed, extended or remodelled over 40 country houses, and undertook numerous public contracts. He also laid out landscape garden schemes, for instance at Newliston and Taymouth Castle.

=== Country houses ===
His first commission seems to have been for extensions to Hopetoun House, near Edinburgh, for Charles Hope, 1st Earl of Hopetoun. Hopetoun had been built only 20 years before by Sir William Bruce, and Adam was retained to rebuild the south-east wing. These works, completed in 1725, aimed to give the east front a bold new facade, stepping forward at the ends with curved sections. According to John Fleming, "nothing so ambitious or imaginative had ever before been attempted in Scotland". Over the following years, Adam would return to Hopetoun, building the south colonnade from 1726, the north wing from 1728, and finally the pavilions from 1736. These were not finished until 1742, the year of the Earl's death, and the completed scheme was finished by Adam's sons after his own death. Adam also laid out the gardens, possibly to designs by Bruce, whose axial style they follow.

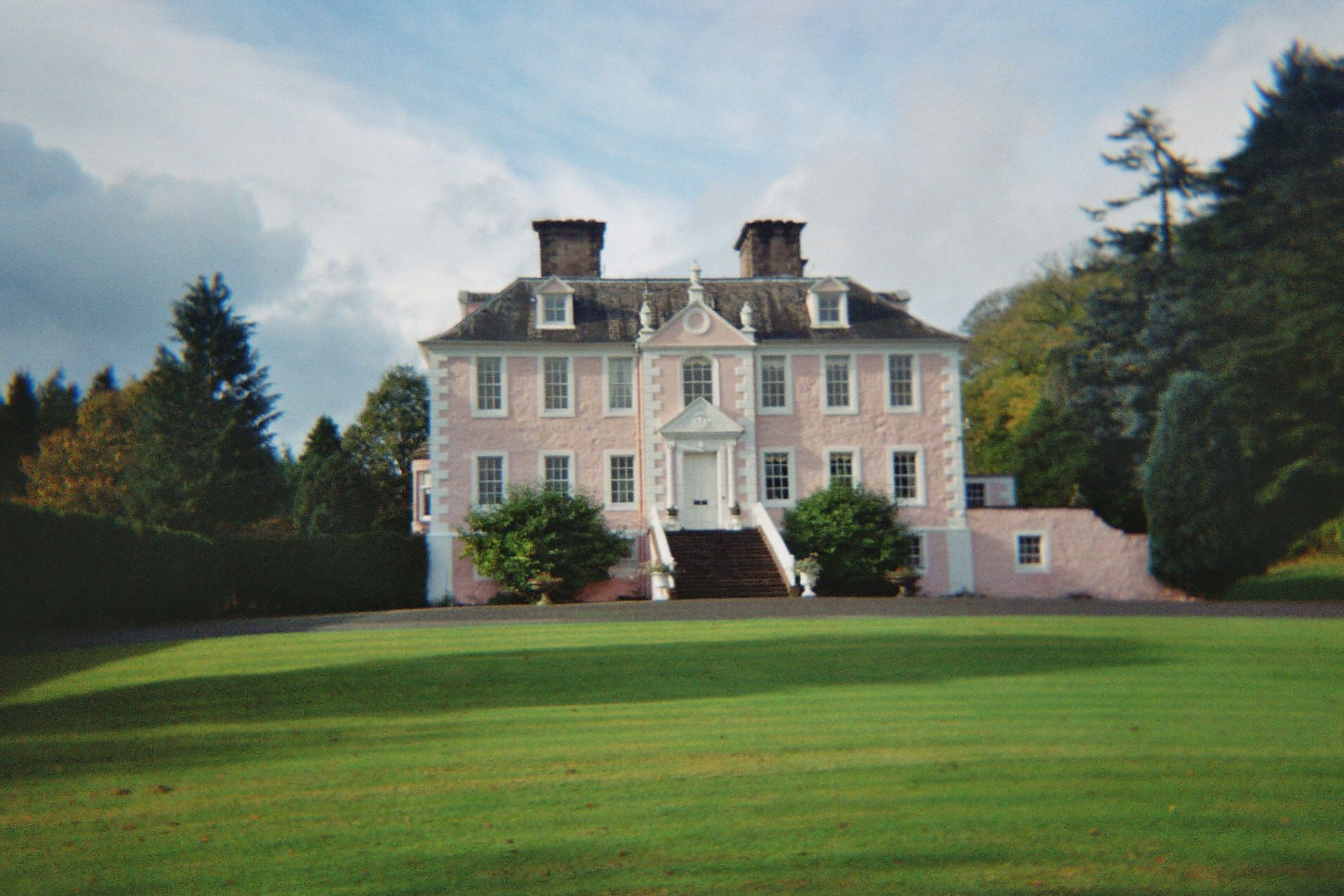
Craigdarroch in Dumfriesshire, a small house designed by Adam in 1729, for Alexander Fergusson

Other early designs included Drum House, which boasted Scotland's first venetian window, and Mavisbank House, both near Edinburgh. Mavisbank House, constructed between 1723 and 1727, was the first Palladian villa in Scotland, a collaboration between Adam and the owner, amateur architect Sir John Clerk of Penicuik. The latter claimed much of the credit, and certainly criticised some of Adam's suggestions, although evidence suggests Adam got his way on a number of points. As at Hopetoun, here Adam enjoyed an unusually close relationship with his client, despite their differences of opinion. His most ambitious early work was the baroque, Vanbrugh-inspired Arniston House, near Gorebridge. Built for Robert Dundas, a lawyer and politician linked to John Dalrymple, 1st Earl of Stair, Arniston includes extensive grounds laid out by Adam, with a parterre and cascade, and a main avenue centred on Arthur's Seat to the north. The stucco work to the hall at Arniston is one of Adam's finest Vanbrughian interiors.

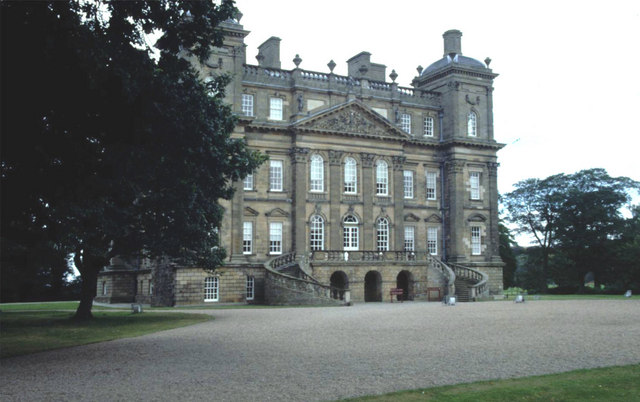
Duff House, "a medieval castle in baroque dress"

Duff House, Adam's major work of the 1730s, demonstrates his accretion of local and foreign influences, presenting itself as "a medieval castle in baroque dress". Built between 1735 and 1739, Adam acted as contractor and architect to William, Lord Braco. James Gibbs had recently built another house for Lord Braco, but he declined the commission for Duff, recommending Adam for the job. The main facade of Duff House is remarkable for its height, and with the tall corner towers the impression is of a highly vertical house. This style is related to the designs produced by the exiled Jacobite Earl of Mar, an amateur architect who collaborated with Adam at the House of Dun. Charles McKean compares Duff to the 17th century Drumlanrig Castle, and places it within the Scottish architectural tradition. Like Drumlanrig, and Heriot's Hospital (1620s–1690s) in Edinburgh before it, Duff House has a double-pile block flanked by taller square corner towers. The "baroque dress" at Duff derives from Vanbrugh, and particularly Eastbury Park (1724–38) in Dorset. Designs for pavilions and quadrant wings were never executed due to Lord Braco's dispute with Adam. Braco never occupied or fitted out the house for the same reason.

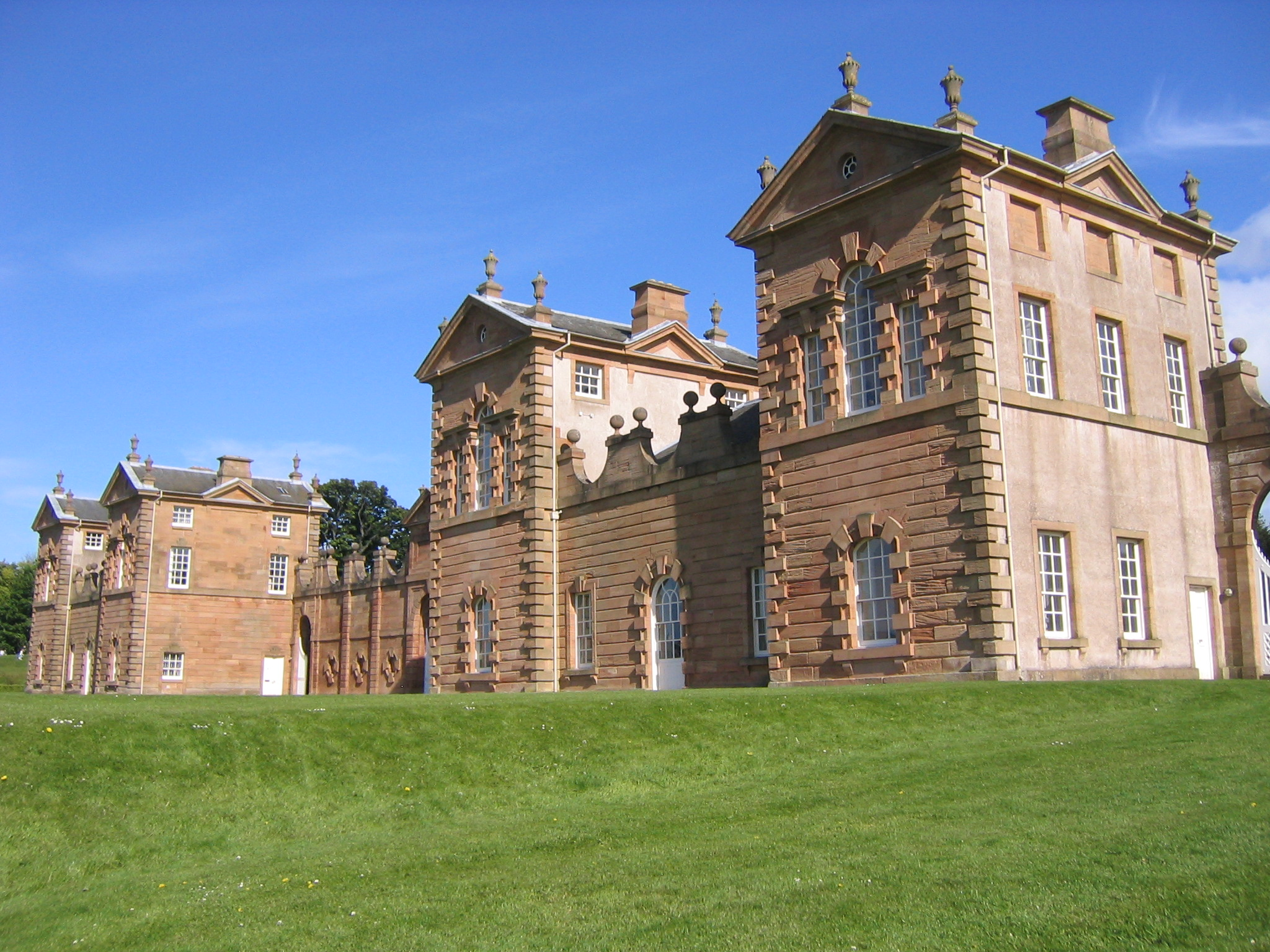
Chatelherault, the Duke of Hamilton's hunting lodge, 1731–43

Adam's other houses of the 1730s include House of Dun in Angus, Tinwald in Dumfriesshire, Lawyers House in Perthshire, and Haddo House in Aberdeenshire. His early, unexecuted design for House of Dun, a collaboration with the Earl of Mar, is interesting, as it appears to show a traditional tall Scottish tower house, complete with spiral stairs within the walls, but externally clad in neo-classical detailing; Adam clearly took some inspiration from the Scottish vernacular. Chatelherault, the Duke of Hamilton's "Dogg Kennel" and hunting lodge near Hamilton, was completed in 1743. His redecoration of the Duke's apartment in Holyroodhouse was Adam's most important interior design commission. In the 1730s Adam extended Taymouth Castle and laid out gardens, although his work was largely demolished to make way for the present building in the 19th century. Adam's approach here mirrored the work of Bruce at Balcaskie, extending a Scottish tower house to form a near-symmetrical architectural composition.

After 1740, Adam built only two houses, Cumbernauld House for the Earl of Wigton, and Cally House for Alexander Murray, which was not complete until 1763. From 1746, Adam was acting as "Intendant General" and contractor, overseeing the building of Inveraray Castle to a Gothic design by Roger Morris. His role was to correspond with the architect on behalf of the client, Archibald Campbell, 3rd Duke of Argyll, and Adam also offered Morris his own advice on detail design. He also provided an early draft for the layout of the new town at Inveraray. His last architectural work was for Lord Lovat in 1744, for a new house at Castle Dounie. The stone was supplied, but construction never started as Lord Lovat was "out" in the Jacobite rising of 1745, and his property was sacked by government troops.

=== Public buildings ===
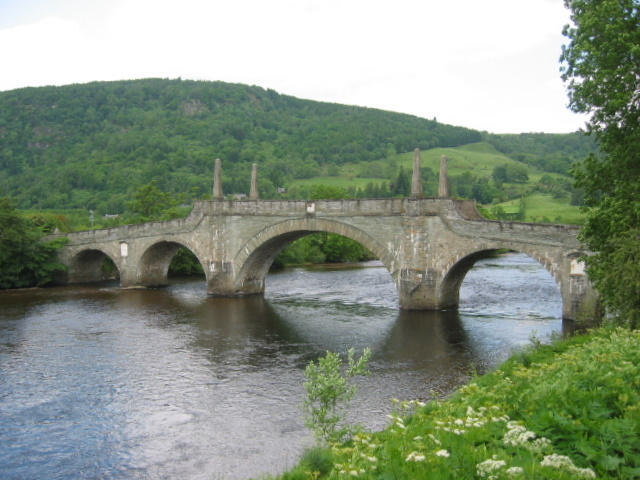
William Adam's Tay Bridge at Aberfeldy

Adam's first public building commissions were in Aberdeen, where he built the town house, or town hall, from 1729 to 1730, since demolished, and Robert Gordon's Hospital from 1730 to 1732, now an independent school. The original Edinburgh Royal Infirmary on Infirmary Street was an imposing building designed by Adam in 1738, although based on a standard Ordnance Board barrack block. One of the first infirmaries in the world, it was founded by physician Alexander Monro, and was demolished in 1884. Remnants of the building can be found on various sites in the city. Also in Edinburgh, Adam built George Watson's Hospital from 1738 to 1741, demolished 2004, which in the 19th century was incorporated by David Bryce as part of the new Royal Infirmary. In 1745, work was completed on William Adam's "New Library" for the University of Glasgow, also since demolished. Adam's town house for Dundee has also been demolished; Haddington Town House remains but is much altered. Adam built only one church, Hamilton Old Parish Church, in 1733 while working on nearby Chatelherault.

The last Jacobite rising occurred in 1745, when "Bonnie Prince Charlie" attempted to seize the British throne, aided by rebellious Scottish Highlanders. In the aftermath of this unsuccessful coup, the Highlands were extensively militarised by the government, and Adam's Ordnance Board work consequently multiplied. He and his sons carried out works at Fort Augustus, Fort William, Carlisle, and the castles of Dumbarton, Stirling, Edinburgh, Blackness, and Duart. He was engaged in 1747 to provide the mason work and brickwork for Fort George near Inverness, although the project only began shortly before Adam's death. Every summer until 1760, one of his sons spent the summer at Fort George, supervising the works under Colonel Skinner, the chief engineer for North Britain.

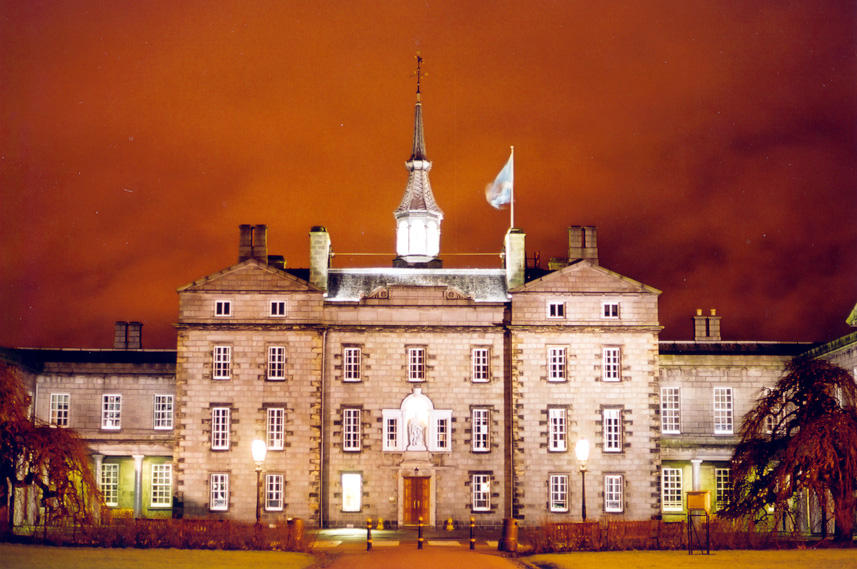
Robert Gordon's Hospital, Aberdeen, now Robert Gordon's College

=== Vitruvius Scoticus ===
In the 1720s Adam planned to publish a book of architectural drawings of Scottish houses, including his own work and that of others. His Vitruvius Scoticus was started and named in response to Colen Campbell's Vitruvius Britannicus. He commissioned some engravings during his 1727 trip to London, and had begun to collect subscriptions. Further engraving were completed in Edinburgh in the 1730s by Richard Cooper. The project then stalled, possibly due to the lack of subscriptions (only 150 were collected, compared to over 700 for Vitruvius Britannicus), although it may have been revived around the time of Adam's death. In 1766, John Adam attempted to restart the project and collect fresh subscriptions, although nothing came of this. The book was finally published in 1812 by John's son William, and contained 160 plates, including 100 of Adam's own designs.

== Legacy ==
William Adam's dominant position in Scottish architecture is reinforced by his lack of contemporaries. Colin McWilliam, in The Buildings of Scotland: Lothian, wondered "whether Scottish architecture at this period... would have achieved very much without him."

Adam's death coincided with the final defeat of the Jacobite threat in 1746, and the advance of the Scottish Enlightenment, which resulted in new styles of building becoming popular. The development of Neoclassicism in the late 18th century was paralleled by a revival of the "castle" form of house, which would lead to the Scottish baronial style. Neither idiom however, owed much to the work of William Adam. As a practical man rather than a theorist, Adam never developed a strong enough style to exert a direct influence on the course of building design.

His main bequest to architectural history were his three architect sons, and in particular Robert Adam, whose success as developer of the "Adam Style" far outran that of his father. Although Robert formed his own style through lengthy study in Rome, John Fleming detects traces of his father's influence on all three of the brothers' work, and suggests that the Adam principle of "movement" in architecture was partly inspired by William's admiration for Vanbrugh. More concretely, Fleming notes that working with their father gave the brothers a solid grounding in the technical aspects of architecture, and introduced them to a set of clients which they might never otherwise have had access to.

=== Critical appreciation ===
Although his contemporaries acclaimed Adam's "genius for architecture", recent architectural historians have found his work of more variable quality. In the 18th and 19th centuries, he was accepted as Scotland's "Universal Architect", and at the end of the 19th century, MacGibbon and Ross suggested in The Castellated and Domestic Architecture of Scotland that William was "at least" the equal in talent of his son Robert.

In the 20th century, a more critical view of Adam's work was taken. For example, Ian Hannah in The Story of Scotland in Stone (1934) found Adam to be "a rather ordinary classical architect". Arthur T. Bolton, in the introduction to his definitive work on Robert and James Adam (1922), dismissed the father's work as "heavy and ordinary", and a mere "compilation of ideas... from Vanbrugh and Gibbs to Kent". John Fleming lamented his "ad hoc improvisation from source books, improperly digested", and decided that he "cannot be allowed great distinction as an architect". John Summerson disregards Adam's work, in Architecture in Britain, 1530–1830 (1953), as it does not fit into the English Palladian orthodoxy, although John Dunbar suggests that "he could express himself convincingly enough in that idiom", for instance at Haddo House. Dunbar found Adam's work "as remarkable for its eclecticism as for its unevenness of quality", and he went on to stress William Adam's "robustness and directness", and found these "appropriate to the artistic climate of North Britain". Gifford also stresses Adam's Scottish context, pointing out that Scotland was in many ways a foreign country during his working life, and indeed was a separate country to England until 1707. Adam should, he argues, be seen not as a provincial British architect, but as "the architect of Scotland".

John Fleming and Colin McWilliam are in agreement that Adam was at his best as a collaborator. Fleming's comment that Adam "was at his best when guided by a man of taste who knew his own mind", is echoed by McWilliam, who suggests that William Adam "always did his best, but did his best architecture... when he was in touch not only with his source books, but with other lively minds".

== Family ==
William Adam and Mary Robertson had ten surviving children:

- Janet ("Jenny") (b. 1717), born at Linktown, later managed their brothers' London business.
- John (b. 3 July 1721), born at Linktown, took over Blair Adam and the other family businesses, as well as practising architecture.
- Robert (b. 3 July 1728), born at Linktown, architect, and best known of the Adam brothers.
- James, (b. 21 July 1732) architect, business partner of Robert.
- William ("Willie") (b. 1738)
- Elizabeth ("Betty"), with Janet, managed their brothers' London business.
- Helen ("Nellie")
- Margaret ("Peggy")
- Mary, married Rev John Drysdale FRSE (1718–1788), minister of the Tron Kirk with the rare distinction of being twice the Moderator of the General Assembly of the Church of Scotland (1773 and 1784), though now chiefly remembered for his friendship with economist Adam Smith.
- Susannah, married Sir John Clerk of Eldin, son of Sir John Clerk of Penicuik.

The birth dates of their five younger daughters are not recorded. In addition another son, named William, and two daughters died in infancy.

After William Adam's death, his oldest son John, inherited the family business, and immediately took his brothers Robert and James into partnership, which would last until the late 1750s when Robert established himself in London. William Adam's obituary in the Caledonian Mercury noted that "it is fortunate he has left behind him some promising young men to carry on what he has so happily begun". John Adam passed Blair Adam on to his own son, lawyer and politician William Adam KC, whose descendants continue to own the estate, and have included several notable politicians, soldiers and civil servants.

== See also ==
- Category:William Adam buildings
