= Adrian Hope, 4th Marquess of Linlithgow =

British noble (born 1946)

The Most Honourable The Marquess of Linlithgow

Marquess of Linlithgow
- Incumbent
- Assumed office 7 April 1987
- Preceded by: Charles Hope

Personal details
- Born: Adrian John Charles Hope, Viscount Aithrie; 1 July 1946 (age 80)
- Spouses: Anne Leveson (m. 1968; div. 1978) Peta Binding (m. 1980; div. 1997) Auriol Mackeson-Sandbach (m. 1997; div. 2007)
- Children: 4
- Education: Eton College

Adrian John Charles Hope, 4th Marquess of Linlithgow (born 1 July 1946), styled Viscount Aithrie until 1952 and Earl of Hopetoun between 1952 and 1987, is a British peer. His family seat is Hopetoun House, near Edinburgh, Scotland. He was educated at Eton College.

== Family ==
Lord Linlithgow has been married three times. He married, firstly, Anne Pamela Leveson, daughter of Arthur Edmund Leveson and Margaret Ruth Maude, on 9 January 1968. The couple had two children before divorcing in 1978 (she is now Countess De La Warr as wife of William Sackville, 11th Earl De La Warr).

- Andrew Victor Arthur Charles Hope, Earl of Hopetoun (b. 22 May 1969); married Skye Laurette Bovill, daughter of Major Bristow Charles Bovill and Kerry Anne Reynolds, on 10 July 1993. The couple have four children.
- Lord Alexander John Adrian Hope (b. 3 February 1971)

He married, secondly, Peta Carol Binding, daughter of Charles Victor Ormonde Binding and Peggy Eileen Godfrey, in 1980. They had two children. He and Peta Carol Binding were divorced in 1997.

- Lady Louisa Vivienne Hope (b. 16 April 1981); married Michael Luke van den Berg in 2012
- Lord Robert Charles Robin Adrian Hope (b. 17 January 1984); married Tamarisk Zoe Morris in 2015

He married, thirdly, Auriol Veronica Mackeson-Sandbach, daughter of Captain Graham Lawrie Mackeson-Sandbach and Geraldine Pamela Violet Sandbach, on 1 November 1997. He and Auriol Veronica Mackeson-Sandbach were divorced in 2004.

The current Marquess is expected to be succeeded by his eldest son, Andrew, Earl of Hopetoun. Lord Hopetoun is married to Skye Bovill, now Countess of Hopetoun. He is a former Page of Honour to Queen Elizabeth the Queen Mother. Lord and Lady Hopetoun took part in Queen Elizabeth II's carriage procession at Royal Ascot.

Lord and Lady Hopetoun live in Hopetoun House and the 4th Marquess lives on the Estate.

Peerage of the United Kingdom
Preceded by Charles Hope	Marquess of Linlithgow; 1987–present	Incumbent; Heir Apparent: Andrew Hope, Earl of Hopetoun
Orders of precedence in the United Kingdom
Preceded by The Most Hon. The Marquess of Zetland	Gentlemen; The Most Honourable the Marquess of Linlithgow	Succeeded by The Most Hon. The Marquess of Milford Haven
