= Sir John Bruce, 2nd Baronet =

Sir John Bruce, 2nd Baronet (before 1671 – 19 March 1711) was the son of William Bruce, an architect, and a member of parliament.

John married Christian Leslie, widow of the Marquess of Montrose and daughter of the Duke of Rothes. In 1702, he succeeded his father as a member of the Parliament of Scotland after William was expelled for his Jacobite sympathies, and was one of the Scottish representatives to the 1st Parliament of Great Britain. John inherited the baronetcy on his father's death in 1710. Following his own death shortly after, the baronetcy became extinct, and the Kinross estate passed to his sister Anne Bruce, who married Sir Thomas Hope, 4th Baronet Hope of Craighall.

Parliament of Scotland
Preceded by Sir David Arnot	Shire Commissioner for Kinross; 1702–1707	Succeeded by Parliament of Great Britain
Parliament of Great Britain
Preceded by Parliament of Scotland	Member of Parliament for Scotland; 1707–1708; With: 44 others	Succeeded by Mungo Graham (as MP for Kinross-shire 1710)
Baronetage of Nova Scotia
Preceded by William Bruce	Baronet (of Balcaskie); 1710–1711	Extinct
