= William Bruce (architect) =

Scottish architect (c. 1630–1710)

Sir William Bruce
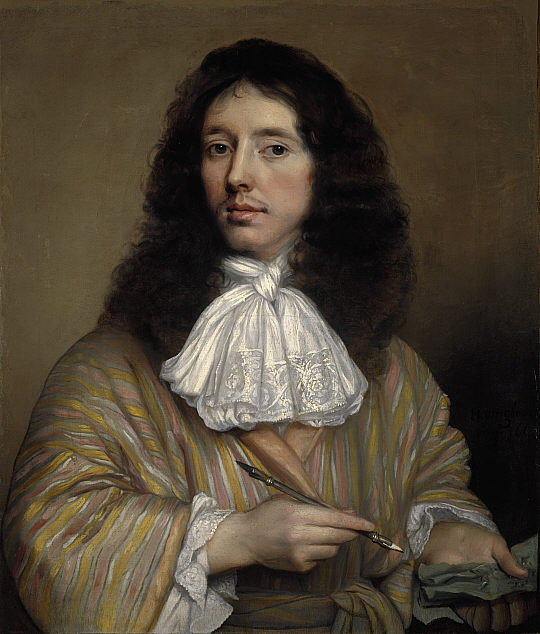
- Painting c. 1664
- Born: c. 1630; Blairhall, Fife, Scotland
- Died: 1710
- Occupation: Architect
- Buildings: Kinross House; Hopetoun House; Thirlestane Castle; Holyroodhouse

Sir William Bruce of Kinross, 1st Baronet (c. 1630 – 1710), was a Scottish gentleman-architect, "the effective founder of classical architecture in Scotland," as Howard Colvin observes. As a key figure in introducing the Palladian style into Scotland, he has been compared to the pioneering English architects Inigo Jones and Christopher Wren, and to the contemporaneous introducers of French style in English domestic architecture, Hugh May and Sir Roger Pratt.

Bruce was a merchant in Rotterdam during the 1650s, and played a role in the Restoration of Charles II in 1659. He carried messages between the exiled king and General Monck, and his loyalty to the king was rewarded with lucrative official appointments, including that of Surveyor General of the King's Works in Scotland, effectively making Bruce the "king's architect". His patrons included John Maitland, 1st Duke of Lauderdale, the most powerful man in Scotland at that time, and Bruce rose to become a member of Parliament, and briefly sat on the Privy Council of Scotland.

Despite his lack of technical expertise, Bruce became the most prominent architect of his time in Scotland. He worked with competent masons and professional builders, to whom he imparted a classical vocabulary; thus his influence was carried far beyond his own aristocratic circle. Beginning in the 1660s, Bruce built and remodelled a number of country houses, including Thirlestane Castle for the Duke of Lauderdale, and Prestonfield House. Among his most significant work was his own Palladian mansion at Kinross, built on the Loch Leven estate which he had purchased in 1675. As the king's architect he undertook the rebuilding of the Royal Palace of Holyroodhouse in the 1670s, which gave the palace its present appearance. After the death of Charles II, Bruce lost political favour and later, following the accession of William and Mary, he was imprisoned more than once as a suspected Jacobite. However, he managed to continue his architectural work, often providing his services to others with Jacobite sympathies.

== Early years ==
Little is known of William Bruce's youth, and his date of birth is unrecorded. He was probably born at Blairhall, now located in western Fife, in around 1630, the second son of Robert Bruce of Blairhall and Katherine Preston. He may have attended St Andrews University in 1637–1638, which would suggest that his birth date was as early as 1625. The Bruces were a well-connected Episcopalian family, strongly loyal to the king, and descended from Thomas Bruce, a cousin of King Robert II, who had been granted lands in Clackmannan and Fife. Bruce's first cousin Edward Bruce was created Earl of Kincardine in 1647.

Letters in the Earl of Kincardine's papers show that William Bruce was in exile in Rotterdam during the 1650s with his cousin, Alexander Bruce, brother of the Earl of Kincardine. As Episcopalians, William and Alexander would have sought refuge from the Puritan Commonwealth established by Oliver Cromwell. In Rotterdam, they were in contact with Sir Robert Moray, a soldier and natural philosopher close to Charles II, who then resided at Maastricht. William Bruce was a merchant, based in the Scottish community in Rotterdam, but traveling widely. He owned a ship with Alexander Bruce and John Hamilton of Grange, and was involved in the trade of wine, coal, and timber between Norway, France, England, Scotland and the Low Countries. He is recorded as having a house and a mistress in La Rochelle. He may have had a son Normand by this mistress since in 1672 he figures as a witness to the baptism at Holyrood of a William Bruce, son of Normand Bruce, mason. Moreover, the marriage record of Normand Bruce states that he was employed at Balcaskie. In 1658, William and Alexander traveled together from Bremen overland to Maastricht to meet Moray. Alexander Bruce and Moray were founder members of the Royal Society in 1660, and it is likely that architecture featured in their discussions, particularly the new town hall in Maastricht that Moray had recently advised on.

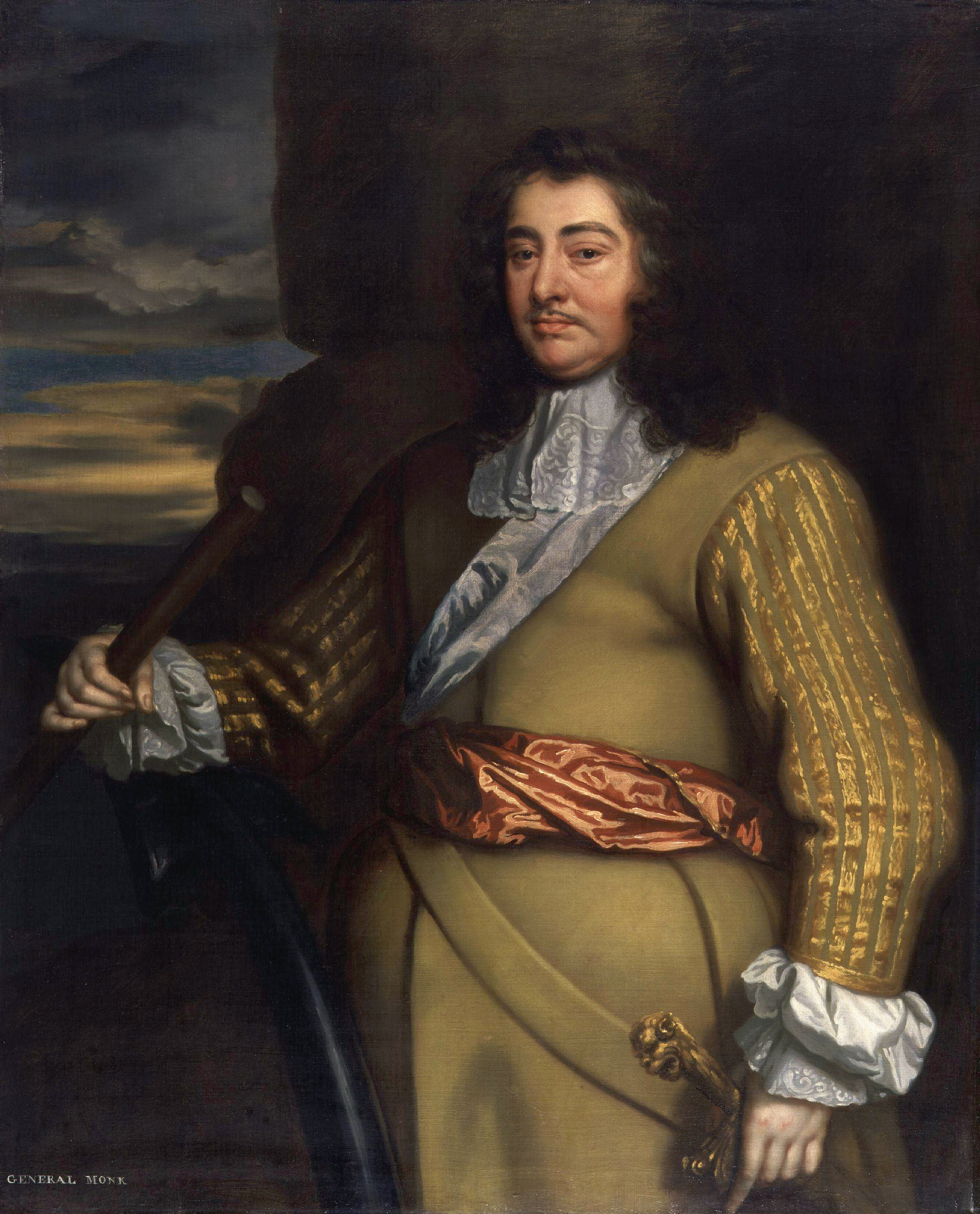
General George Monck, painted 1665–1666 from the studio of Sir Peter Lely

In 1659, Bruce acted as a messenger between General Monck, Cromwell's commander-in-chief in Scotland, and the exiled King Charles II. A passport survives, issued to Bruce by Monck in September 1659, and giving him permission to remain in Scotland until his "returne to Holland," and it appears that the messages he brought from Charles persuaded Monck to march his army to London, a decisive event in the Restoration. The nature of their communications is not known, although it would appear that Moray selected him for the task. Sir Robert Douglas stated that Bruce "painted the distress and distractions" of Scotland before the General, and suggested to him "the glory that would be acquired in restoring the royal family."

== Political career ==
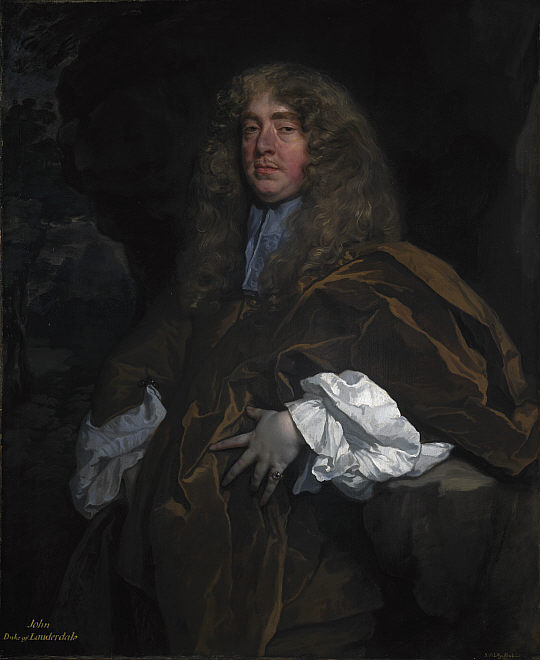
John Maitland, 1st Duke of Lauderdale, by Sir Peter Lely. Lauderdale was the most powerful man in Scotland, and Bruce benefited from his patronage.

Following the restoration, William Bruce was appointed Clerk to the Bills in 1660, and Clerk of Supply to the Lords in Council in 1665. Both were lucrative positions, involving collection of fees, from Parliament in the first case, and from petitioners to the Court of Session in the latter. Meanwhile, Sir Robert Moray had established himself as a courtier and scientist at Whitehall, London, and employed Bruce as a trusted messenger between Whitehall and the Duke of Lauderdale, Secretary for Scotland.

Moray later served on the Treasury Commission for Scotland, as did Alexander Bruce, now Earl of Kincardine. Bruce reported to this commission as a revenue collector, and benefited from the patronage of its members. The Commission had responsibility for the King's Works, and in 1667 Bruce was appointed Superintendent and Overseer of the Royal Palaces in Scotland. Four years later he was made Surveyor General of the King's Works in Scotland, with a salary of £3600 Scots (£300 Sterling, or £ 57,000 in 2025), for the purpose of rebuilding Holyroodhouse. In March 1671, Bruce was part of a syndicate which bought the rights to collect taxes over a five-year period, paying £26,000 Sterling (£ 5 million in 2025) for the privilege. As such, it would appear that Bruce was not only the architect of Holyroodhouse, but one of the principal financiers of the £21,000 project.

As a key figure of the Restoration administration, William Bruce became close to other Stuart loyalists, who included such powerful patrons as the Duke of Lauderdale, Lord Haltoun, and the Earl of Rothes. In 1667, he undertook his first building work for Lord Rothes, overseeing the extensions to Leslie House, and later worked on several of Lauderdale's properties, concurrently with Holyroodhouse. In 1668 he was created a Baronet of Nova Scotia.

From 1669 to 1674 Bruce sat in the Scottish Parliament as shire commissioner for Fife, and from 1681 to 1682 as a shire commissioner for Kinross. From April 1685 to May 1686 he reached the peak of his political career, as a member of the Privy Council of Scotland. But, in 1674, he became embroiled in factional rivalry between his patron Lauderdale, and his rivals William Douglas, Duke of Hamilton and John Hay, 2nd Earl of Tweeddale. His actions, which apparently included passing information to Hamilton, invoked the fury of Elizabeth Maitland, Duchess of Lauderdale, who tried to persuade her husband to deprive Bruce of his offices. Bruce survived, although his relationship with his patron was damaged. Lauderdale described him as "the bitterest factionalist partie man of his quality in all Scotland". This breakdown resulted in Bruce's eventual dismissal as Surveyor General of the King's Works, on the false pretext that Holyroodhouse was finished.

Bruce's earnings from his offices had made him a wealthy man, even by the standards of his patrons. This wealth allowed him to purchase the Balcaskie estate in 1665, and to extend the house and gardens. In 1675 he purchased the larger estate of Loch Leven, Kinross, from William Douglas, 9th Earl of Morton, which brought him the hereditary sheriffdom of Kinross-shire. In the late 1670s Bruce took on his first architectural projects for entirely new houses.

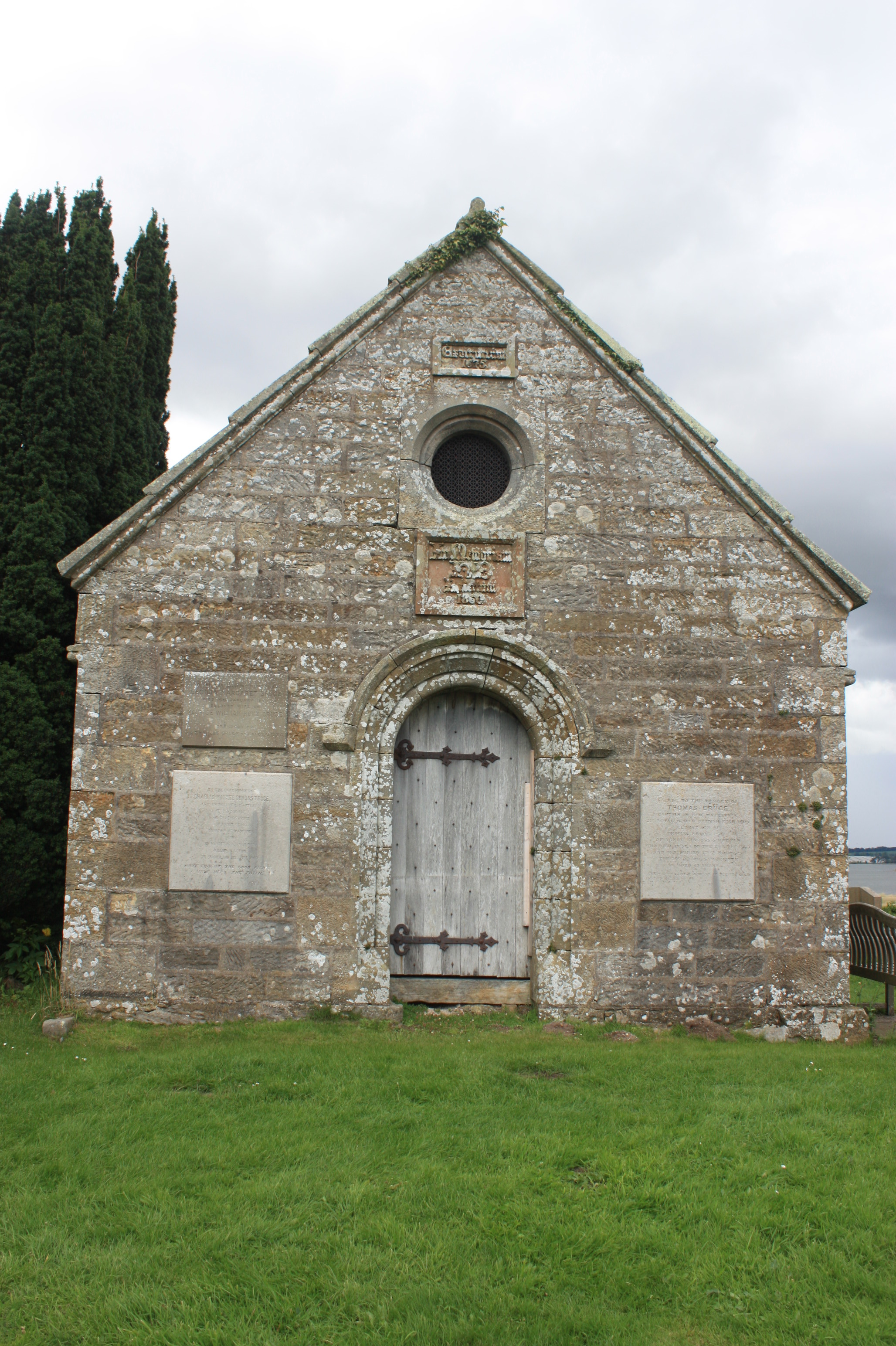
The Bruce family vault, old Kinross churchyard

Following the accession of James VII in 1685, Bruce gradually fell from favour, and was distrusted by the new regime. After the Revolution of 1688, and the accession of William of Orange as king, he was once again at odds with his Protestant rulers, and he refused to take up his seat in Parliament. As a staunch Episcopalian, Bruce was considered a potential Jacobite threat. In 1693 he was briefly imprisoned in Stirling Castle for refusing to appear before the Privy Council. He was incarcerated again at Stirling in 1694, and from 1696 in Edinburgh Castle. Bruce was expelled from parliament in 1702, his seat passing to his son John Bruce. Despite these imprisonments, he continued his architectural work, indeed the 1690s and 1700s were his most prolific years. Bruce was imprisoned at Edinburgh Castle again in 1708 and was only released a short time before his death, at the beginning of 1710.

He was buried in the family mausoleum at Kinross Kirk. The ruins of the church still stand beside Kinross House; the mausoleum remains intact in the churchyard. Dating from 1675, it was built by Bruce shortly after he acquired the estate.

Bruce's surviving account books show purchases of books on music, painting and horticulture, as well as numerous foreign-language works, suggesting that William Bruce was a learned man. He studied horticulture extensively, and applied his knowledge of the subject in his own gardens at Kinross. He was a friend of James Sutherland of the Edinburgh Botanic Garden, and may have known John Evelyn and other English horticulturalists.

== Family ==
Bruce's first wife was Mary Halkett, daughter of Sir James Halkett of Pitfirrane. Their son John succeeded to his father's baronetcy in 1710 and died on 19 March 1711. Around 1687, John Bruce married Christian, Dowager Marchioness of Montrose. She was the widow of James Graham, 3rd Marquess of Montrose, and the daughter of John Leslie, 1st Duke of Rothes. John Bruce left no issue and the estate passed to his sister, and then to her son, Sir William's grandson, John Bruce Hope.

After the death of his first wife, Sir William Bruce married Magdalen Scott, widow of an Edinburgh merchant called George Clerk, in 1700. They had no issue. Magdalen lived until 1752, and gained a reputation as a Jacobite, establishing a Jacobite cell at her home in Leith Citadel.

== Architectural works ==
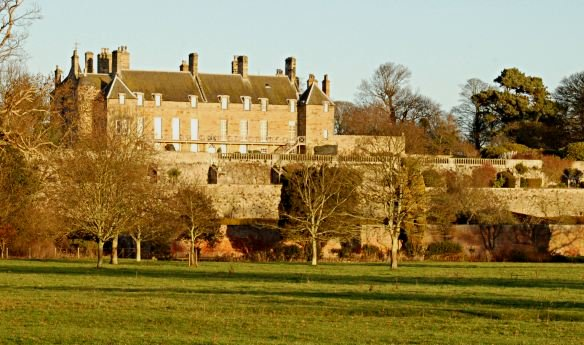
The south front of Balcaskie, showing the near-symmetrical facade, and Italian terraces

=== Influences ===
The Netherlands provided William Bruce with many of his influences. He was in the Low Countries at a time when Italian Classicism was the height of fashion, and similarities have been observed between Bruce's work, particularly Holyroodhouse, and such buildings as the Amsterdam City Hall (1648–65), the work of Jacob van Campen, and Maastricht's City Hall (1659–1664), by Pieter Post. Alexander Bruce had married a Dutch woman with family ties to the House of Orange, and it seems likely that he provided links to the Dutch artisans who worked on some of Bruce's projects.

Bruce was certainly familiar with northern France, and in 1663 he made a further "foreign journey" at the behest of Lauderdale, although his itinerary is unknown. Whether by visit or through studying engravings, he knew several notable French houses including Vaux-le-Vicomte, Blérancourt, and the Château de Balleroy, the last the work of French architect François Mansart. These modern French designs, incorporating features then unknown in Scotland, such as the double-pile of major rooms in two enfilades, ranged back-to-back, were also influential on Bruce's designs.

English influence is also visible in his work. His country houses took the compact Anglo-Dutch type as their model, as introduced into England by Hugh May and Sir Roger Pratt, but with Continental detailing, such as the rustication on the façade at Mertoun. Roger Pratt's Coleshill House of 1660 is often cited as a model for Bruce's Kinross House. Konrad Ottenheym concludes that Bruce employed an "international style", which was fashionable in France, Holland, and England, and that he was pivotal in disseminating this style in Scotland.

=== Early works ===
Bruce's early work involved advising clients and rebuilding existing houses, rather than designing new buildings from scratch. Panmure House and Leslie House (seat of the Earl of Rothes) had been projects of the king's master mason John Mylne. At Panmure, although Bruce has been credited with the design in the past, the works were overseen by Alexander Nisbet, although Bruce did design the gates and gate piers. At Leslie, Bruce oversaw the works after Mylne's death, and probably made his own amendments. Panmure was demolished in the 1950s, and only a small part of Leslie House remains standing, following a fire in the 18th century. Bruce later advised William Douglas, 1st Duke of Queensberry regarding his plans for Drumlanrig Castle.

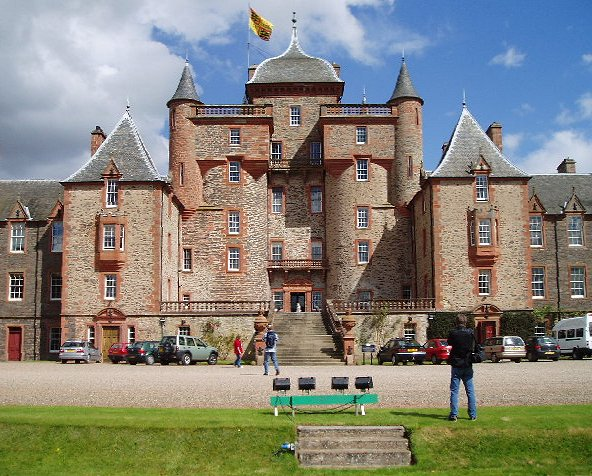
The main front of Thirlestane Castle, largely as Bruce remodelled it

Bruce also worked on his own property at Balcaskie, Fife, which he bought in 1665, and which does survive intact, although with later alterations. He doubled the L-plan house to a near-symmetrical U-plan, and may have built the curving wing-walls and linking pavilions. Gifford, however, attributes these to a later building phase. The curving walls, a form later seen at Hopetoun, were a new innovation if Bruce did carry them out, possibly inspired by the work of the Italian Gian Lorenzo Bernini. In the gardens he laid out parterres and stepped "Italian" terraces, with a vista leading the eye to the Bass Rock, all inspired by French baroque gardens such as Vaux-le-Vicomte. Internally, Bruce created a new layout of rooms, and it was for his continental-inspired internal planning, as much as his exterior design, that he was sought after as an architect.

In 1670 the Duke of Lauderdale commissioned Bruce to remodel Thirlestane Castle, his 16th-century tower house in the Border country. Bruce, working with King's master mason Robert Mylne, extended the building with new corner pavilions and a new entrance, and re-planned the interior. Lauderdale continued to employ Bruce, often working closely with Lord Haltoun, Lauderdale's brother, during the 1670s, on his homes at Brunstane near Edinburgh, and Lethington (later renamed Lennoxlove), as well as commissioning a design for new gates at his English property, Ham House, near London, in 1671. At Ham Bruce may have had further involvement with the remodelling works going on there, under the direction of the English architect William Samwell. While engaged at Thirlestane, Bruce also designed the nearby Lauder Kirk, his only complete church. One of very few 17th century cruciform-plan churches in Scotland, it may have been inspired by François Mansart's similar church at Balleroy in France.

=== Holyroodhouse ===
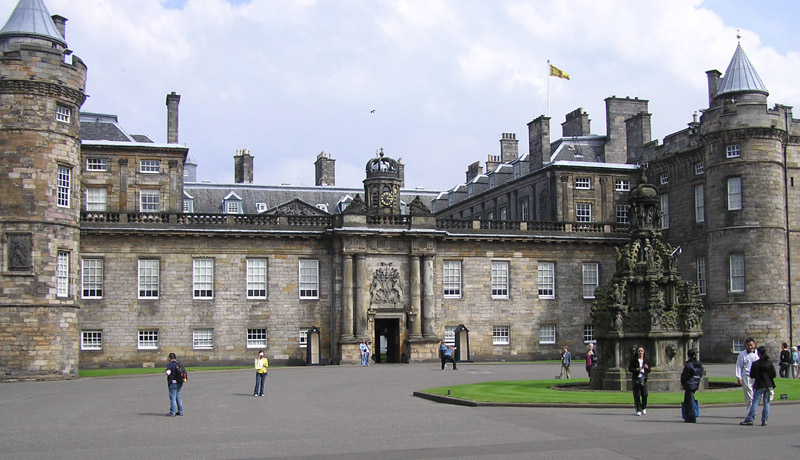
The entrance front of Holyroodhouse, as designed by Bruce

William Bruce's appointment as Surveyor General of the King's Works in Scotland was made chiefly for the purpose of rebuilding the palace of Holyroodhouse. Aside from this project, he only carried out minor repairs to Edinburgh and Stirling Castles, and to the fortifications on the Bass Rock. Charles I had intended to extend and rebuild Holyroodhouse, and plans had been drawn up in the 1630s. Nothing was done however, and in 1650 the palace was burnt out, destroying all but the west range. Bruce was contracted to design and oversee the works, with Robert Mylne acting as contractor. Bruce's plans were drawn up by Mylne, as Bruce himself apparently lacked the technical skills of architectural drawing.

Charles II criticised Bruce's initial plans for the internal layout, and an improved scheme was eventually approved. Construction began in July 1671, and by 1674 much of the work was complete. Bruce built a second gothic tower to mirror the existing one built by James V between 1528 and 1532, and created the courtyard block in a restrained classical style. A second phase of work started in 1676, when the Duke of Lauderdale ordered Bruce to demolish and rebuild the main west façade, resulting by 1679 in the screen wall, topped by a carved imperial crown, which forms the main entrance.

Also in 1676, Bruce drew up plans for the completion of Heriot's Hospital in Edinburgh, which had been started in the 1620s. His design, for the central tower of the south façade, was eventually executed in 1693.

=== Country houses ===
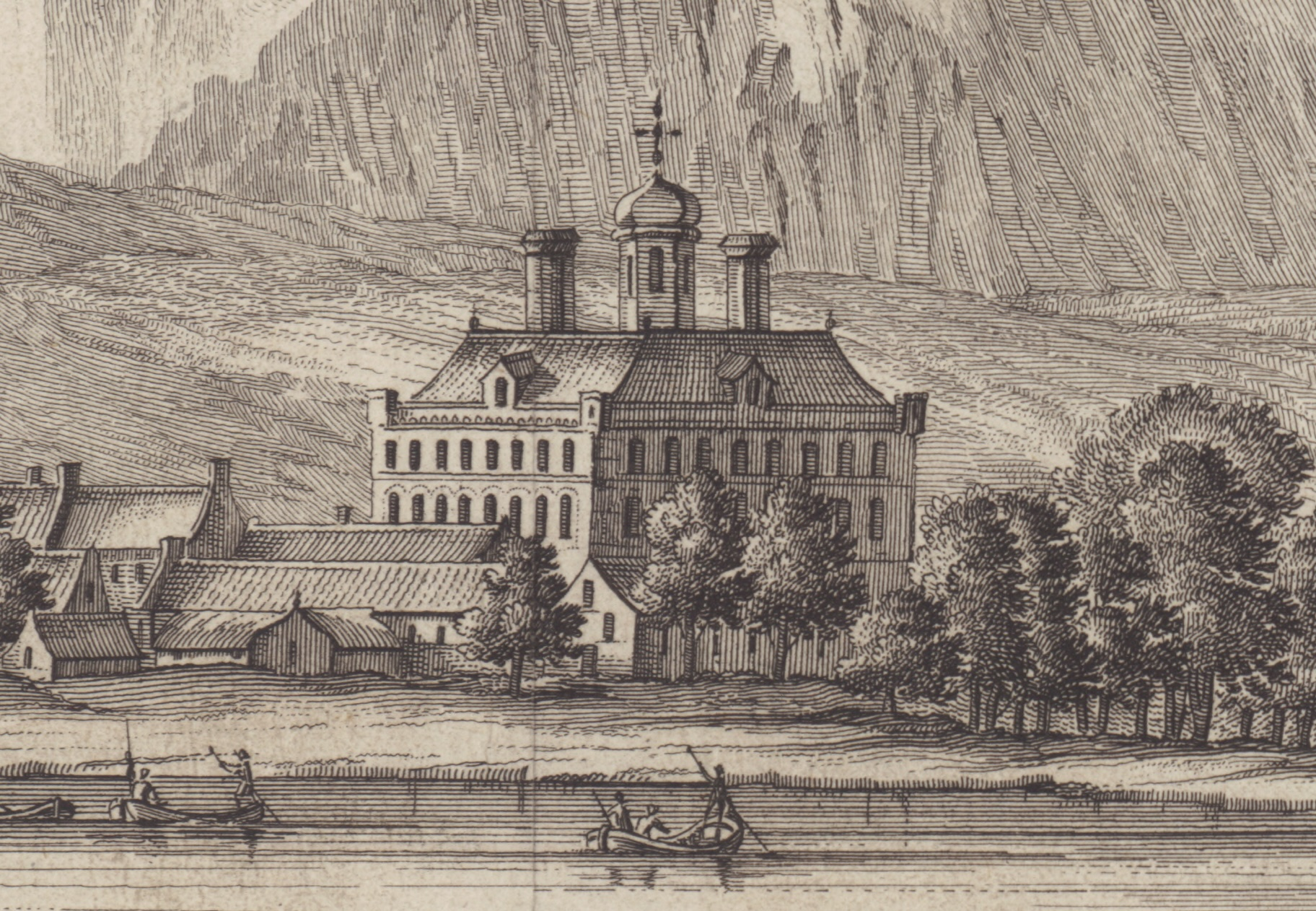
Old Dunkeld House, c. 1693

His first commission for a new building was for the construction of Dunkeld House, and came from John Murray, 2nd Earl of Atholl in 1676. The house had been badly damaged in 1654, during the civil war, and Bruce was given the task of building its replacement. (The house was later demolished). Another early full-scale commission was for Moncrieffe House (1679), which burned down in 1957.

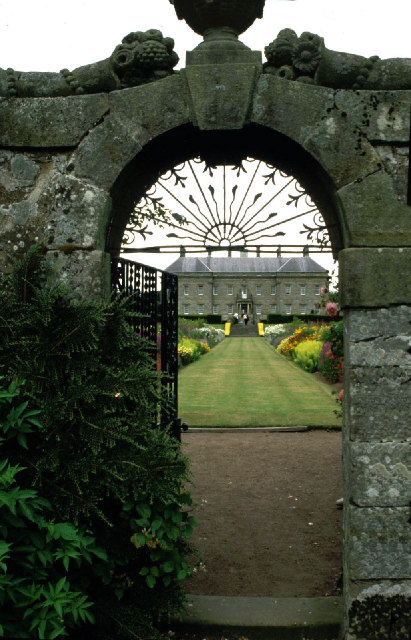
East front of Kinross House, seen through the garden gate

In 1675, Bruce bought the estate of Loch Leven from the Earl of Morton. The estate included an old manor near Kinross, as well as the ruins of Lochleven Castle, famous as the jail of Mary, Queen of Scots. After carrying out repairs on the old manor, and beginning to lay out the gardens, Bruce began work on his new home, Kinross House, in 1686, employing master mason Thomas Bauchop. The Palladian building bears some resemblance to Roger Pratt's Coleshill House of 1660 (demolished), but with features Bruce derived from French sources. These features, ultimately classical and Italian in origin, include the rusticated basement stonework, and the giant order of corinthian pilasters, the latter possibly deriving from Bernini's first designs for the Louvre Colonnade. Following Bruce's fall from favour, he found himself increasingly in debt, which delayed the completion of the house until 1693. Kinross was one of the earliest Palladian-style country houses in Scotland, and was recognised as one of the finest buildings in the country; Daniel Defoe described it as "the most beautiful and regular piece of Architecture in Scotland", and Thomas Pennant called Kinross "the first good house of regular architecture in North Britain".

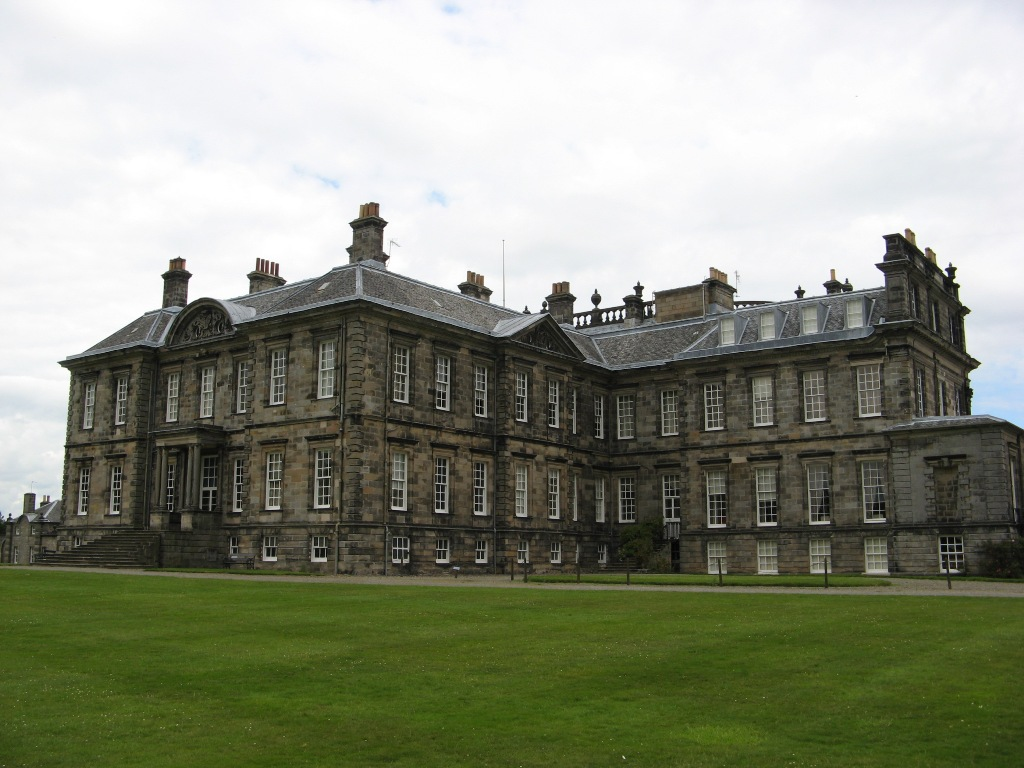
The west front of Hopetoun, which was designed by Bruce for Charles Hope. The east front was enlarged and remodelled by William Adam.

Despite William Bruce's fall from political favour, and his intermittent imprisonment, he continued to practice. During the 1690s he completed Hill of Tarvit (1696), Craighall (1697–99) in Fife, and Craigiehall (1699) near Edinburgh. The latter, built for William Johnstone, 1st Marquess of Annandale, still stands, and was used as the British Army's Scottish headquarters until 2015. From 1698 he was working on a new house for the young Charles Hope, later 1st Earl of Hopetoun. Hopetoun House, near Edinburgh, was completed in 1702, and represents Bruce's grandest country house design. The master mason was again Thomas Bauchop, and the inspiration was again Anglo-Dutch, with French rustication. The bulk of Bruce's work is now obscured by 18th-century remodelling, carried out by William Adam. Bruce was commissioned again by Hopetoun in 1708, to build a private aisle at Abercorn Kirk. The Hopetoun Loft overlooks the interior of the kirk, and connects to a retiring room with an oval "squint" giving a view of the pulpit.

In 1702 Bruce was commissioned by the burgesses of Stirling to design the new Stirling Tolbooth. Bruce provided only sketch plans, which were executed by local masons between 1703 and 1705. Bruce's last country houses were Harden House (now known as Mertoun House), built for the Scotts in the Borders, and his smallest house, Auchendinny in Midlothian.

His final work, built from 1706 to 1710, was the House of Nairne, for the Jacobite William Murray, 2nd Lord Nairne. The house was not completed until two years after Bruce's death, and the extent of his involvement is unclear. Nairne House was demolished in 1760, although the cupola was retained and installed on the roof of the King James VI Hospital in nearby Perth.

== Legacy ==
Although Daniel Defoe called Bruce "the Kit Wren of North Britain", for his role as the effective founder of classical architecture in that country, Gifford suggests he is more comparable to Hugh May and Roger Pratt in his achievements. Like May and Pratt, he popularised a style of country house amongst the nobility, encouraging the move away from the traditional "tower house", which came to be perceived as increasingly anachronistic, towards a more continental, leisure-oriented architecture. Sir John Clerk of Penicuik named Bruce as "the chief introducer of architecture in this country", while to Colen Campbell, compiler of Vitruvius Britannicus, he was "justly esteem'd the best Architect of his time in that Kingdom". His work was a major influence on the design of country houses in the 18th century, an influence which was spread through the masons and draughtsmen he worked with, including Mylne and Bauchop, James Smith, and Alexander Edward. At Kinross his deliberate alignment of the main vista on the ruins of Lochleven Castle suggested to Howard Colvin "that Bruce, like Vanbrugh, has a place in the prehistory of the picturesque".

== Notes ==
Parliament of Scotland
Preceded by William Scott; Sir Henry Wardlaw	Shire Commissioner for Fife; 1669–1674; With: Sir John Wemyss	Succeeded by Sir Charles Halkett; William Anstruther
Vacant	Shire Commissioner for Kinross; 1681–1686	Succeeded by Sir David Arnot
Baronetage of Nova Scotia
New title	Baronet (of Balcaskie); 1668–1710	Succeeded by John Bruce
Political offices
Vacant Title last held by James Murray Jr.	Surveyor General of the King's Works in Scotland; 1671–1678	Vacant Title next held by Sir Archibald Murray of Blackbarony
