= Hopetoun House =

Category A listed building; historic Scottish country house

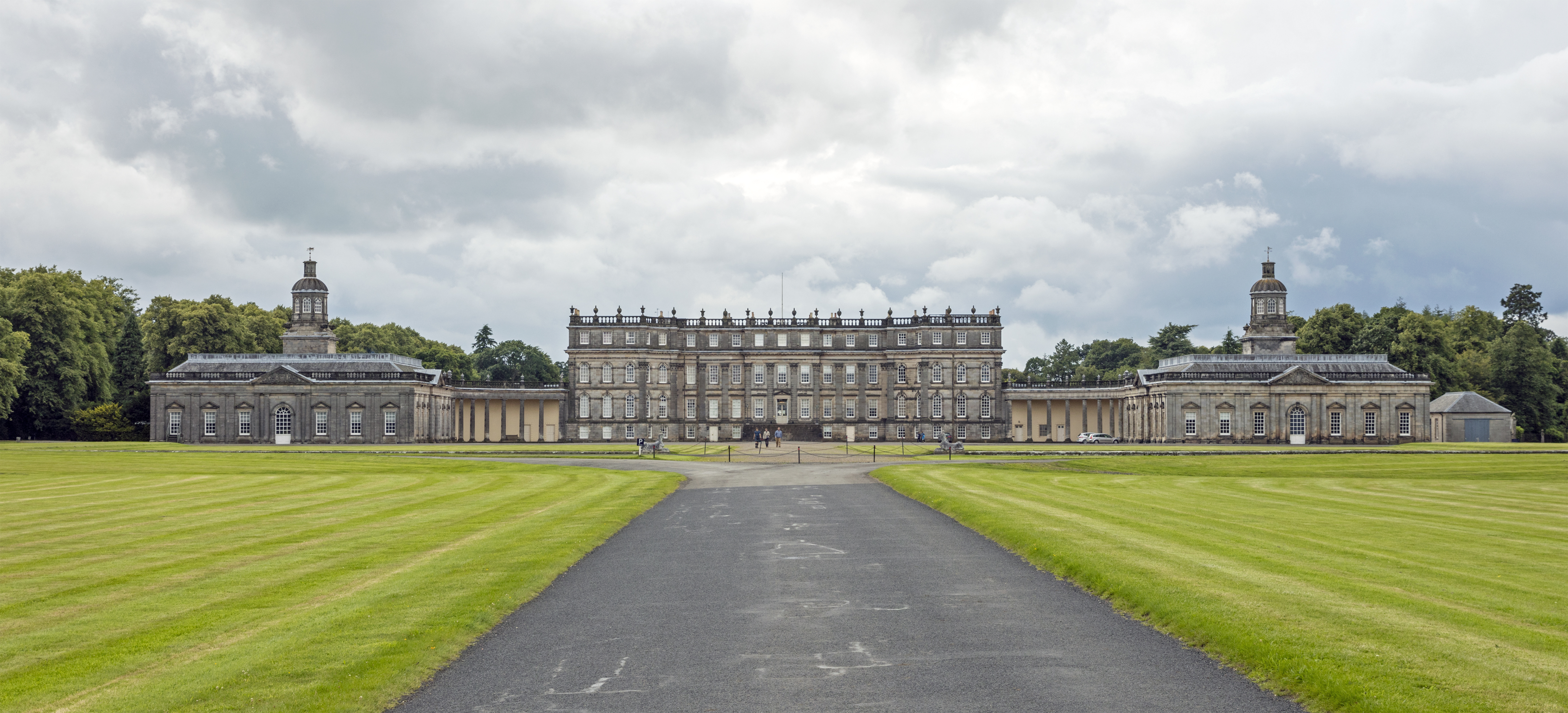
- East facade of Hopetoun House and gardens

- Location in West Lothian
- 55.9954°N 3.4629°W

History
- Built: 1699–1752
- Built for: Charles Hope, 1st Earl of Hopetoun

Site notes
- Architect(s): Sir William Bruce, William Adam, Robert Adam, John Adam
- Owner: The 4th Marquess of Linlithgow

Listed Building – Category A
- Designated: 22 February 1971
- Reference no.: LB613

Inventory of Gardens and Designed Landscapes in Scotland
- Official name: Hopetoun House
- Designated: 1 July 1987
- Reference no.: GDL00212

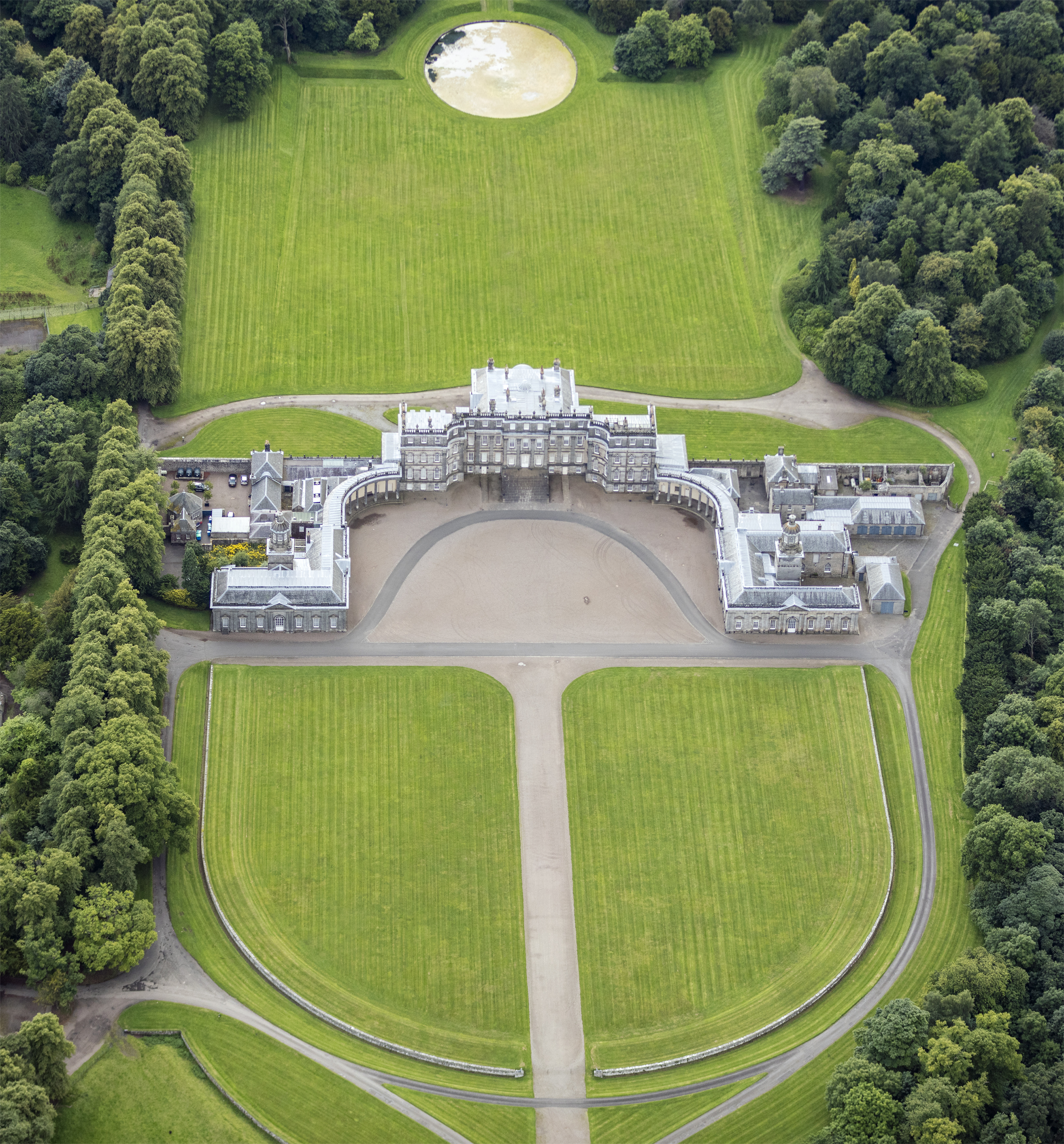
Aerial view

Hopetoun House is a stately home near South Queensferry in West Lothian, Scotland. It is owned by the Hopetoun House Preservation Trust, a charity established in 1974 to preserve the house and grounds as a national monument, to protect and improve their amenities, and to preserve the furniture, paintings, manuscripts, and other articles of historical interest associated with the house. In the interior are valuable portraits by Thomas Gainsborough and George Dance the Younger, and paintings by Rubens, Rembrandt, van Dyck, Backhuysen and Canaletto. The south wing of the house is occupied by the family of Adrian Hope, 4th Marquess of Linlithgow. The house is a Category A listed building. and the grounds are included in the Inventory of Gardens and Designed Landscapes in Scotland.

== History ==
=== Architecture ===
The house was built 1699–1701 and designed by Sir William Bruce, with Bruce's master mason Tobias Bauchop in charge of the construction and working drawings (aided by his apprentice Alexander Edward). The house was then hugely extended from 1721 by William Adam until his death in 1748, being one of his most notable projects. The interior was completed by his sons John Adam and Robert Adam. The magnificent entrance hall dates from 1752.

The Hope family acquired the land in the 17th century and operated lead mines. Charles Hope, the first occupant, was only 16 years old when his mother, Lady Margaret Hope, signed the contract for building with William Bruce, on 28 September 1698. The master mason was Tobias Bachope of Alloa. The plumber and glazier was John Forster of Berwick.

The house was the site of the departure of King George IV on 29 August 1822 after his Scottish visit and the knighthood of Captain Adam Ferguson and Henry Raeburn.

=== Grounds ===
The English-style landscape park in which the house lies was laid out in 1725, also by William Adam. The east front centres on the distant isle of Inchgarvie and North Berwick Law. The walled garden dates from the late 18th century. In the grounds an 18th-century mound was excavated in 1963 to reveal the remains of the earlier manor house, Abercorn Castle, dating from the 15th century.

=== Preservation ===
In 1974, Charles Hope, 3rd Marquess of Linlithgow created the Hopetoun House Preservation Trust to ensure Hopetoun House and the estate were preserved for future generations.

== Access ==
Throughout the year, Hopetoun House plays host to weddings, private events, and exclusive celebrations, with its grand interiors, catering, and surroundings.

Open to the public from Easter to late September, the House and Grounds offer a seasonal visitor experience, architecture and natural beauty.

== In popular culture ==
First seen as the Duke of Sandringham's home, Hopetoun House has been used in seasons 1, 2 and 3 of Outlander, to recreate scenes in Scotland, England and Paris.

In 2020, some scenes for the ITV drama series Belgravia were filmed at the castle.

In the 2020 film The Princess Switch: Switched Again, Hopetoun House was used for the exterior of the fictional Montenaro Royal Palace.

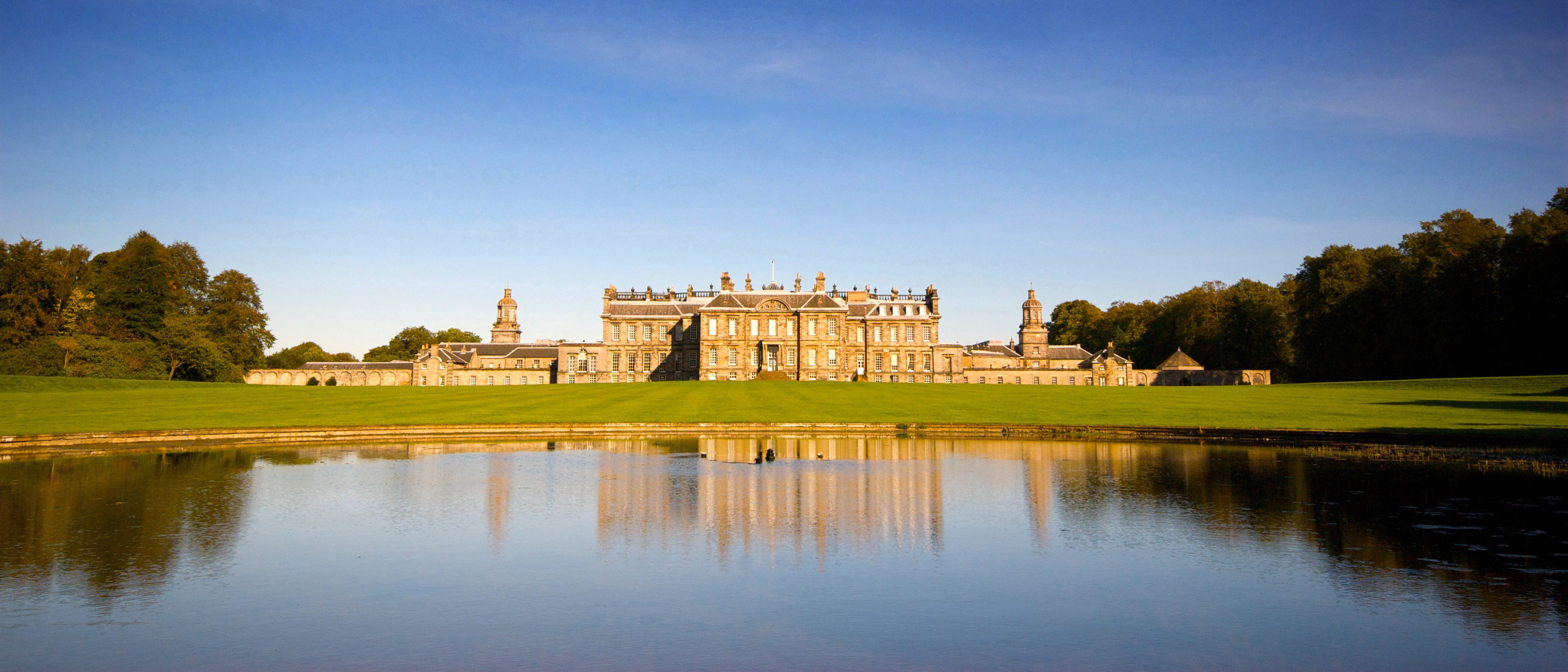
Hopetoun House and Gardens
