= Kinross House =

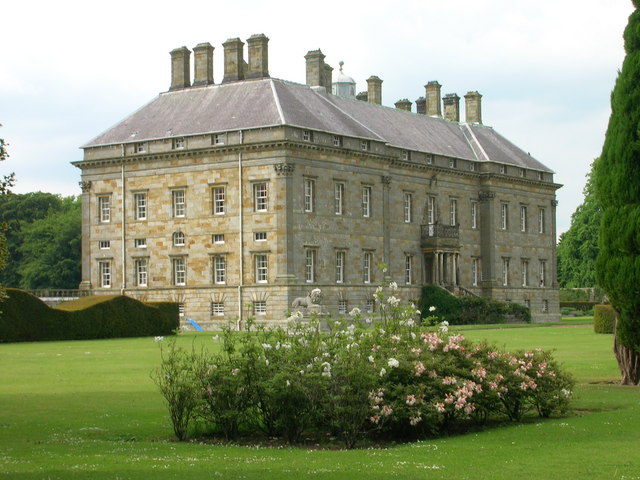
- The garden front of Kinross House

- Location within Perth and Kinross

General information
- Coordinates: 56.203003°N 3.409553°W

Inventory of Gardens and Designed Landscapes in Scotland
- Official name: Kinross House
- Designated: 1 July 1987
- Reference no.: GDL00247

Kinross House is a late 17th-century country house overlooking Loch Leven, near Kinross in Kinross-shire, Scotland.

== History ==
Construction of the house began in 1685, by the architect Sir William Bruce as his own home. It is regarded as one of his finest works, and was called by Daniel Defoe "the most beautiful and regular piece of architecture in Scotland". The builder was Tobias Bauchop of Alloa.

The house retains most of its original internal decoration. It was occupied for 200 years as the home of the Montgomery family, who purchased the property in the late 18th century. Kinross House is a Category A listed building, and its grounds are listed in the Inventory of Gardens and Designed Landscapes in Scotland.

The grounds cover 100 acres of formal gardens and woodland, also including Castle Island on Loch Leven. Lochleven Castle is amongst the most important medieval castles in Scotland, and is renowned as the castle where Mary Queen of Scots debated the future of the Scottish Reformation with Presbyterian theologian John Knox and where she was later imprisoned in 1567. It is also where she abdicated the Scottish throne in favour of her infant son James VI (later to become King James I of England).

In 2010, the house and grounds were sold to Donald Fothergill (becoming Baron of Kinross in the Baronage of Scotland) a Yorkshire businessman, who thoroughly refurbished the house. Kinross House and its grounds are now offered for hire for gatherings such as parties, weddings and meetings. The House and Coach House have a number of reception rooms and 24 bedrooms located between the House and the adjacent Coach House: the main house has 14 bedrooms and the Coach House has a further 10 bedrooms. The Coach House also has a boutique day spa.

== Media ==
Kinross House was featured in the BBC TV series The Country House Revealed (2011) and How We Built Britain (2007) as well in Land of Hope and Glory - British Country Life. The series was accompanied by a full-length illustrated companion book published by the BBC which featured Kinross House as a dedicated chapter appearing as Chapter Two of the book edition. The six chapters of the book correspond to the six episodes of the BBC series.
