= Campbell baronets =

Set index for Campbell baronets

There have been 18 baronetcies created for persons with the surname Campbell, six in the Baronetage of Nova Scotia and twelve in the Baronetage of the United Kingdom.

- Campbell baronets of Glenorchy (1625)
- Campbell baronets of Lundy (1627)
- Campbell baronets of Auchinbreck (1628)
- Campbell baronets of Ardnamurchan and Airds (first creation, 1628)
- Campbell baronets of Aberuchil (c.1668)
- Campbell baronets of Ardkinglass (1679)
- Livingston baronets of Glentirran (1685) (later Campbell)
- Campbell baronets of Succoth (1808)
- Campbell (later Cockburn-Campbell) baronets, of Gartsford (1815/1821): see Cockburn-Campbell baronets
- Campbell baronets of St Cross Mede (1815)
- Campbell baronets of Inverneil (1818): see Sir James Campbell, 1st Baronet
- Campbell baronets of New Brunswick (1831)
- Campbell baronets of Carrick Buoy (1831)
- Campbell baronets of Barcaldine and Glenure (1831)
- Campbell baronets of Dunstaffnage (1836)
- Campbell baronets of Blythswood (1880): see Baron Blythswood
- Campbell baronets of Ardnamurchan (second creation, 1913)
- Campbell baronets of Milltown (1917): see Baron Glenavy
- Campbell baronets of Airds (1939)

== See also ==
- Clan Campbell
- Campbell-Orde baronets
- Cockburn-Campbell baronets
- Home-Purves-Hume-Campbell baronets
