= General Campbell =

General Campbell may refer to:

== United Kingdom ==
- Alexander Campbell (died 1832) (c. 1750–1832), British Army general
- Alexander Douglas Campbell (1899–1980), British Army major general
- Sir Alexander Campbell, 1st Baronet (1760–1824), British Army lieutenant general
- Archibald Campbell (British Army officer, born 1739) (1739–1791), British Army major general
- Archibald Campbell (British Army officer, born 1774) (1774–1838), British Army major general
- Sir Archibald Campbell, 1st Baronet (1769–1843), British Army general
- Archibald Campbell, 1st Duke of Argyll (1658–1703), British Army general
- Archibald Campbell, 1st Marquess of Argyll (1607–1661), Scottish general in the Scottish Civil War
- Barrington Campbell, 3rd Baron Blythswood (1845–1918), British Army major general
- Colin Campbell (British Army officer, born 1754) (1754–1814), British Army lieutenant general
- Colin Campbell (British Army officer, born 1776) (1776–1847), British Army lieutenant general
- Colin Campbell, 1st Baron Clyde (1792–1863), British Army general
- David Campbell (British Army officer) (1869–1936), British Army general
- Duncan Campbell (British Army general) (1763–1837), British Army general
- Frederick Campbell (British Army officer, born 1780) (1780–1866), British Army general
- Gunning Campbell (1863–1920), Royal Marines major general
- Sir Guy Campbell, 1st Baronet (1786–1849), British Army major general
- Henry Frederick Campbell (1769–1856), British Army general
- James Campbell (British Army officer, died 1745) (c. 1680–1745), British Army lieutenant general
- James Campbell (Royal Marines officer) (1761–1840), Royal Marines major general
- Sir James Campbell, 1st Baronet (1763–1819), British Army lieutenant general
- Jock Campbell (British Army officer) (1894–1942), British Army major general
- John Campbell (1802–1878) (1802–1878), British Army general
- John Campbell, 1st Marquess of Breadalbane (1762–1834), British Army lieutenant general
- John Campbell, 2nd Duke of Argyll (1680–1743), British Army general
- John Campbell, 4th Duke of Argyll (c. 1693–1770), British Army general
- John Campbell, 4th Earl of Loudoun (1705–1782), British Army general
- John Campbell, 5th Duke of Argyll (1723–1806), British Army general
- John Hasluck Campbell (1855–1921), British Army brigadier general
- John Vaughan Campbell (1876–1944), British Army brigadier general
- Sir John Campbell, 1st Baronet (1836–1915), British Army major general
- Neil Campbell (British Army officer) (1776–1827), British Army major general
- Patrick Campbell (British Army officer, born 1684) (c. 1684–1751), British Army lieutenant general
- Shawn W. Campbell (fl. 1990s–2020s), U.S. Air Force brigadier general
- Victor Campbell (British Army officer) (1905–1990), British Army major general
- Walter Campbell (British Army officer) (1864–1936), British Army lieutenant general
- William Pitcairn Campbell (1856–1933), British Army lieutenant general

== United States ==
- Alexander William Campbell (general) (1828–1893), Confederate States Army brigadier general
- Boniface Campbell (1895–1988), U.S. Army major general
- Charles C. Campbell (general) (1948–2016), U.S. Army general
- Charles Thomas Campbell (1823–1895), Union Army brigadier general
- Craig Campbell (politician) (born 1952), Alaska National Guard lieutenant general
- Donald M. Campbell Jr. (born 1955), U.S. Army lieutenant general
- Harold D. Campbell (1895–1955), U.S. Marine Corps major general
- James L. Campbell (born 1949), U.S. Army lieutenant general
- James R. Campbell (Illinois politician) (1853–1924), U.S. Volunteers brigadier general
- John F. Campbell (general) (born 1957), U.S. Army general
- John Allen Campbell (1835–1880), Union Army brevet brigadier general
- Kevin T. Campbell (1973–2011), U.S. Army lieutenant general
- Levin H. Campbell Jr. (1886–1976), U.S. Army lieutenant general
- Murdock A. Campbell (1889–1972), Vermont National Guard major general
- William Campbell (general) (1745–1781), Virginia Militia brigadier general
- William B. Campbell (1807–1867), Union Army brigadier general
- William J. Campbell (general) (1931–2017), U.S. Air Force lieutenant general

== Others ==
- Angus Campbell (general) (fl. 1980s–2020s), Australian Army general
- Ian Ross Campbell (1900–1997), Australian Army major general
- Kathryn Campbell (fl.2000s–2020s), Australian Army Reserve major general
- Lloyd Campbell (general) (born c. 1947), Canadian Air Force lieutenant general

== See also ==
- Attorney General Campbell (disambiguation)
