= John McKail =

Australian politician

Member of the Legislative Council of Western Australia
- In office 18 October 1870 – 4 April 1871
- Preceded by: None (new seat)
- Succeeded by: Albert Hassell
- Constituency: Albany

Personal details
- Born: 22 January 1810 Deptford, Kent, England
- Died: 6 August 1871 (aged 61) Albany, Western Australia, Australia

John McKail (22 January 1810 – 6 August 1871) was an early settler of Western Australia. He was among the first arrivals in the Swan River Colony in 1829, but in 1835 was banished to Albany after trouble with the law. In Albany, he set up as a merchant and subsequently developed interests in a number of fields. He owned hotels, invested in whaling, and exported sandalwood to Asia. McKail served in the Legislative Council from 1870 to 1871, as one of the council's first elected members.

== Early life ==
McKail was born in Deptford, Kent, England, and was descended from an old Scottish Covenanter family. His father, Nathaniel, was a naval architect at Deptford Dockyard, and had intended for his son to take up the same profession. That did not eventuate, however, as at the age of 19, McKail secured a place on board Parmelia, the ship carrying the first British settlers (including the new governor, James Stirling) to the Swan River Colony. His father was an acquaintance of the Mangles family, of which Stirling's wife was a member.

== Swan River Colony ==
After arriving in the new colony, McKail and a friend initially camped out on Mount Eliza, overlooking the Perth townsite. He worked as a carpenter, helping with the construction of various government buildings. McKail was in trouble with the law on several occasions in the early 1830s, and was eventually banished from Perth. He was charged with "riotous behaviour" in 1833, and in May 1835 was charged with the manslaughter of Gogalee, the son of Yellagonga (a local Noongar leader). McKail reputedly confessed to shooting Gogalee, but because the circumstances were disputed the colonial authorities believed it was unlikely that a jury would convict him. An acquittal would have angered the local Aborigines, so it was decided that, instead of a trial, McKail would pay blood money to Gogalee's family, and then be expelled from the area.

== Albany ==
McKail arrived in Albany later in 1835, and initially worked as a commercial agent for Anthony Curtis, a merchant who traded between Albany and Fremantle. He was again in trouble with the law in 1836, when he was imprisoned for illegally selling alcohol. McKail eventually went into business on his own, in the late 1830s acquiring two hotels (which he leased to others) and a large warehouse. He was also contracted by the government to build Albany's first jetty. Beginning in 1841, McKail chartered a brig, the Emily Smith, which he used to trade with Singapore and China. The ship would carry sandalwood to those countries and return to Australia with a cargo of sugar and tea, which were sold in Adelaide. McKail also had interests in whaling, and acquired several pastoral properties, including in the Porongorup Ranges, on the Hay River, and at Torbay.

From 1843 to 1846, McKail taught at a school in Albany for Aboriginal children. He also helped build St John's Anglican Church, splitting the shingles for the roof himself. In October 1870, McKail was elected to the Legislative Council, winning the seat of Albany unopposed. The 1870 elections were the first official elections held in Western Australia. However, McKail served in parliament for less than six months before resigning his seat in April 1871, becoming the first elected member to do so. The journey from Albany to Perth in those days took seven days, and there was no reimbursement for travel expenses. McKail died in Albany later that year, aged 61. He had married Henrietta Jenkins in 1839, with whom he had two sons and seven daughters.
