= Richard F. Natonski =

United States Marine Corps general

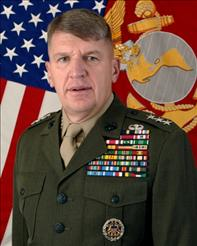
- Born: 1951 (age 74–75)
- Military career
- Allegiance: United States
- Branch: United States Marine Corps
- Service years: 1973–2010
- Rank: Lieutenant general
- Commands: 1st Battalion 2nd Marines; 24th Marine Expeditionary Unit; Task Force Tarawa; 1st Marine Division; Deputy Commandant; U.S. Marine Corps Forces Command
- Conflicts: Vietnam War; Persian Gulf War; Iraq War
- Awards: Navy Distinguished Service Medal; Defense Superior Service Medal; Legion of Merit

Richard F. Natonski is a retired United States Marine Corps lieutenant general whose last assignment was as the Commander of U.S. Marine Corps Forces Command. He assumed the post in August 2008, having previously served as the United States Marine Corps Deputy Commandant for Plans, Policies and Operations from 2006. He retired at Marine Barracks 8th & I on 8 September 2010.

== Early life and education ==
Originally from Amsterdam, New York, Richard Natonski grew up in New Canaan, Connecticut after his family moved there in April 1956. His parents were Frank J. Natonski and Sadie C. Strenges Natonski. He graduated from the University of Louisville in 1973 with a Bachelor of Arts degree in History and was commissioned a second lieutenant in the United States Marine Corps.

== Career ==
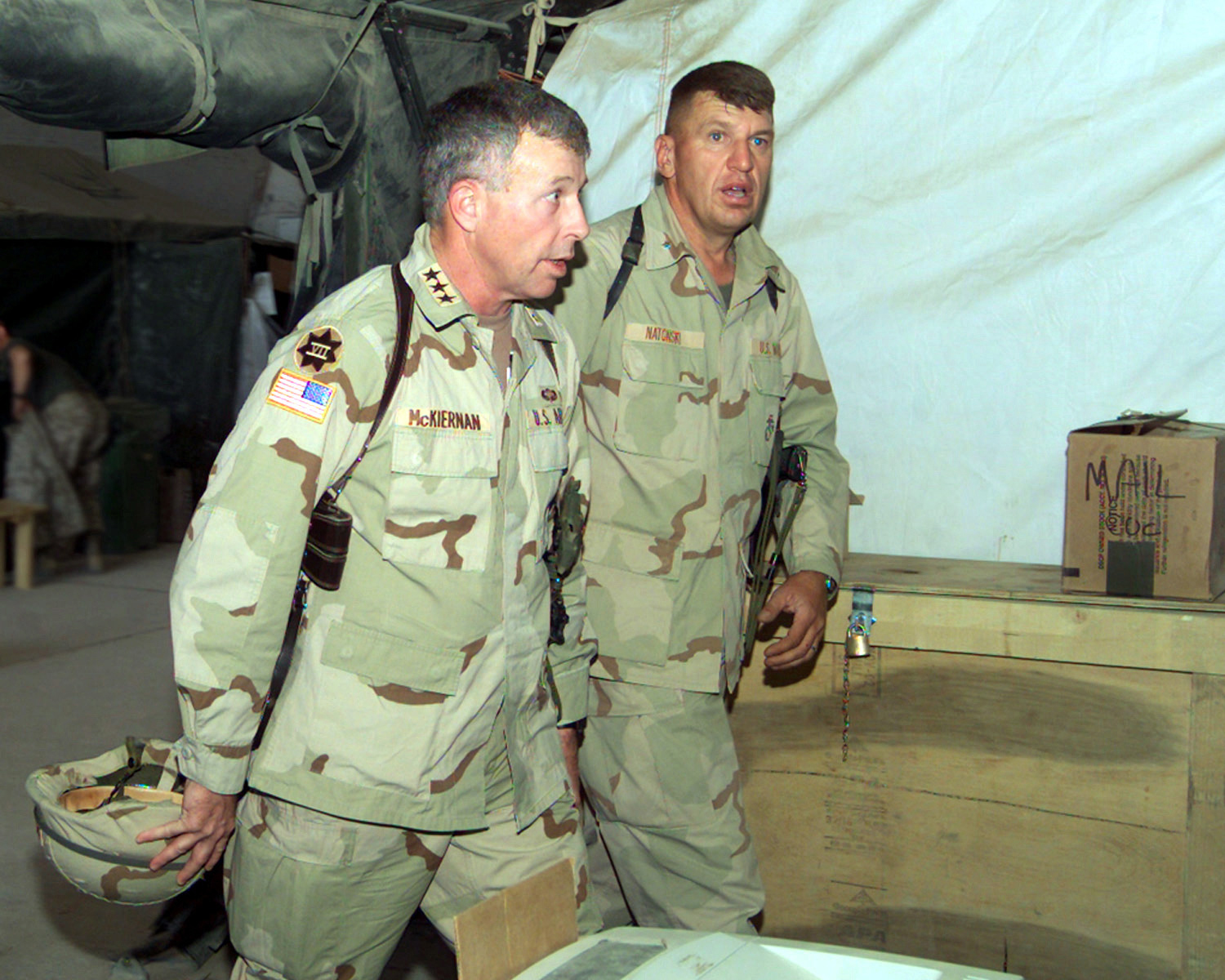
Natonski with David D. McKiernan in May 2003

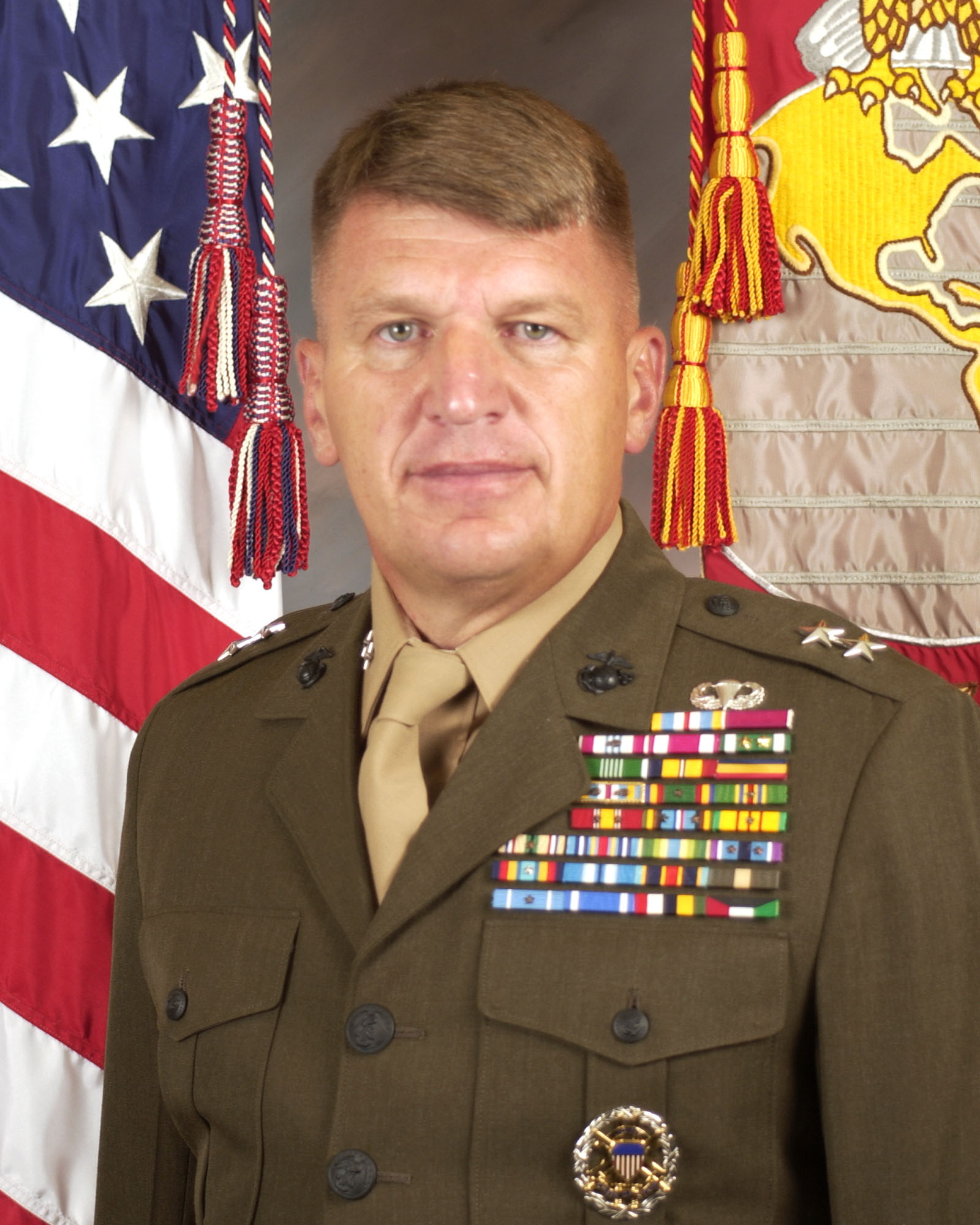
Natonski as a major general in August 2004

Upon completion of The Basic School in 1974, Natonski served as a platoon commander and executive officer with Company H, 2nd Battalion, 4th Marines. There he participated in Non-Combatant Evacuation Operations in Cambodia (Operation Eagle Pull) and in South Vietnam (Operation Frequent Wind).

Transferring to Marine Corps Recruit Depot San Diego in July 1975, Natonski was assigned as a series commander in Company A, 1st Recruit Training Battalion and subsequently as the battalion operations officer. In April 1978, Captain Natonski was transferred to Marine Barracks, 8th and I, where he served as executive and commanding officer of Company B.

Upon completion of this tour in Washington, D.C. in 1981, he spent the summer as a platoon commander at Officer Candidates School prior to attending the Amphibious Warfare School in Quantico, Virginia.

In July 1982, he was assigned as the operations officer for 1st Battalion, 5th Marines at Camp Pendleton, California. Subsequent to his tour in the 1st Marine Division, Major Natonski was transferred to Headquarters Marine Corps in July 1984, where he served in the Ground Combat Requirements Branch of the Plans, Policy, and Operations Department. From 1987 to 1988, he attended the Marine Corps Command and Staff College.

Following his instruction at Quantico, he was assigned as an Observer to the United Nations Truce Supervision Organization in the Middle East. Upon completion of this tour in June 1989, he was transferred to the 2nd Marine Aircraft Wing at Cherry Point, North Carolina, where he was assigned as the G-3 plans officer.

In July 1991, now a lieutenant colonel, Natonski was transferred to 2nd Marine Division, where he served as the executive officer of the 2nd Marine Regiment until assuming command of 1st Battalion, 2nd Marines in May 1992. As commanding officer, he participated in Operation GTMO, a humanitarian relief mission for Haitian migrants in Cuba and Operations Restore Hope and Operation Continue Hope in Somalia. He completed his tour in the Division as the deputy G-3.

From 1994 to 1995 he attended the NATO Defense College in Rome, Italy. Natonski as a colonel served in the II Marine Expeditionary Force Operations Section until assuming command of 24th Marine Expeditionary Unit (MEU) in October 1995. Natonski as a colonel made two deployments as MEU commander supporting operations in Bosnia and Kuwait. In May 1998, he gave up command of the MEU and reported to the Joint Staff in The Pentagon where he was assigned duties as the chief of the Central Command Division, Joint Staff (J-3) Operations Directorate and subsequently the deputy director for Operations in the National Military Command Center. Following his tour on the Joint Staff, Brigadier General Natonski served first as the Director of the Strategy and Plans Division and then as the Director of the Operations Division in the Plans, Policies, and Operations Department of Headquarters Marine Corps.

Brigadier General Natonski assumed command of 2nd Marine Expeditionary Brigade (MEB) in June 2002. From January to June 2003 the MEB deployed in support of Operation Iraqi Freedom. During this operation 2nd MEB was redesignated as Task Force Tarawa and employed as the lead ground maneuver element under I Marine Expeditionary Force. They fought the Battle of Nasiriyah and participated in the rescue of Jessica Lynch.

Major General Natonski assumed command of the 1st Marine Division in August 2004, while in Iraq. There he led the ground maneuver element under I MEF through counter insurgency operations, the Battle of Fallujah (Operation Al–Fajr), and the Iraqi National Elections in January 2005.

On 12 June 2006, the Secretary of Defense announced that President George W. Bush had nominated Natonski for appointment to the rank of lieutenant general, to be assigned as the Deputy Commandant, Plans, Policies, and Operations. Natonski became Deputy Commandant on 7 November 2006 upon the retirement of LtGen. Jan Huly and received his third star. He served in this post until August 2008 when he assumed command of U.S. Marine Corps Forces Command.

On 8 September 2010, Gen. James T. Conway, the Commandant of the Marine Corps, presented Lt. Gen. Natonski with a signed letter from President Barack Obama thanking him for his service during his retirement ceremony at Marine Barracks Washington. Natonski served in the Marine Corps for 37 years. He retired as the most decorated Marine on active duty.

=== Battle of Wanat investigation ===
On 30 September 2009, US Central Command commander General David Petraeus appointed United States Marine Corps Lieutenant General Richard F. Natonski to lead a new inquiry into the Battle of Wanat which would look into related issues "beyond the tactical level." General Natonski's review "focused on the totality of circumstances that included and affected actions at Wanat", including interviews of the officers involved, and reviews of previous investigations with the exception of the Fort Leavenworth Combat Studies Institute (CSI) narrative—stating that it had "not undergone pre-publication vetting and academic review in accordance with standing CSI research protocols".

In June 2010, upon the conclusion of Natonski's investigation, Army General Charles C. Campbell revoked the reprimands, citing that they would have a "chilling effect" on ground operations. The "Army said that the second look at the incident proved that the officers were 'neither negligent nor derelict' and that 'their actions were reasonable under the circumstances.'"

== Awards and decorations ==

Badge	Basic Parachutist Insignia			
1st row	Navy Distinguished Service Medal w/ one gold star		Defense Superior Service Medal	Legion of Merit
2nd row	Bronze Star	Defense Meritorious Service Medal w/ 1 oak leaf cluster	Meritorious Service Medal	Navy and Marine Corps Commendation Medal w/ 2 award stars
3rd row	Army Commendation Medal	Combat Action Ribbon	Navy Presidential Unit Citation	Joint Meritorious Unit Award w/ 4 oak leaf clusters
4th row	Navy Unit Commendation w/ 2 service stars	Navy Meritorious Unit Commendation w/ 2 service stars	National Defense Service Medal w/ 2 service stars	Armed Forces Expeditionary Medal w/ 3 service stars
5th row	Vietnam Service Medal w/ 1 service star	Southwest Asia Service Medal w/ 1 service star	Iraq Campaign Medal w/ 1 service star	Global War on Terrorism Expeditionary Medal
6th row	Global War on Terrorism Service Medal	Korea Defense Service Medal	Armed Forces Service Medal	Humanitarian Service Medal w/ 2 service stars
7th row	Navy Sea Service Deployment Ribbon w/ 6 service stars	Navy Arctic Service Ribbon	Navy & Marine Corps Overseas Service Ribbon	Marine Corps Drill Instructor Ribbon
8th row	United Nations Medal w/ 1 service star	NATO Medal for Yugoslavia	Inter-American Defense Board Medal	Kuwait Liberation Medal (Kuwait)
Badge	Office of the Joint Chiefs of Staff Identification Badge			
