= Tony Curtis (disambiguation) =

Tony Curtis (1925–2010) was an American actor.

Tony or Anthony Curtis may also refer to:

- Tony Curtis (Irish poet) (born 1955), Irish poet
- Tony Curtis (Welsh poet) (born 1946), Welsh poet and author
- Tony Curtis (American football) (born 1983), American football tight end
- Anthony Samuel Curtis (1926–2014), British writer, editor, and critic
- Anthony Curtis (writer) (born c.1958), American gambler and author
- Anthony Curtis (character), a fictional character from the 1995 film Dead Presidents
- Anthony Curtis (whaler) (1796–1853), Australian whaler and businessman
