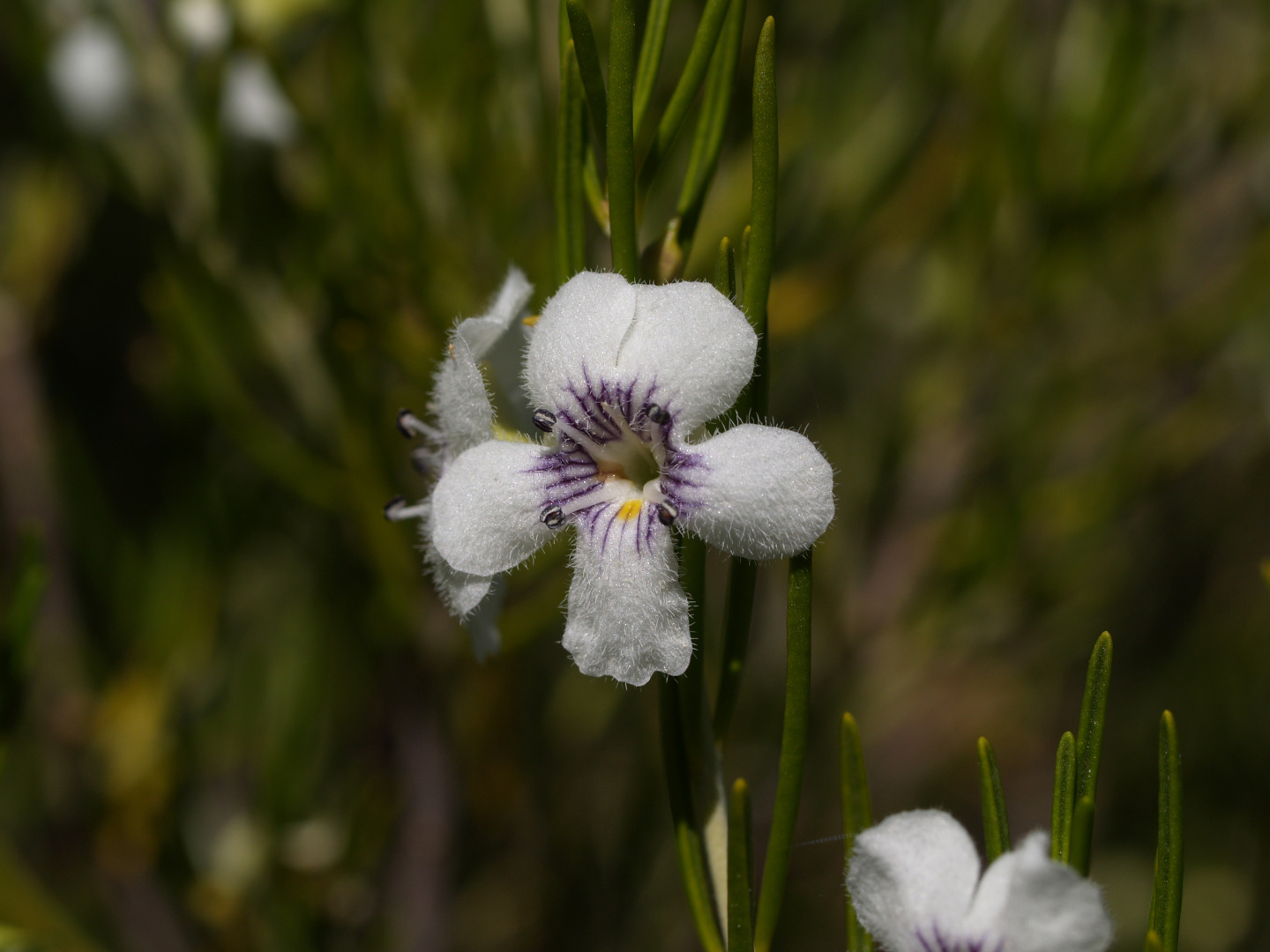
- Near Wiluna

Scientific classification
- Kingdom: Plantae
- Clade: Tracheophytes
- Clade: Angiosperms
- Clade: Eudicots
- Clade: Asterids
- Order: Lamiales
- Family: Lamiaceae
- Genus: Prostanthera
- Species: P. campbellii

Binomial name
- Prostanthera campbellii F.Muell.
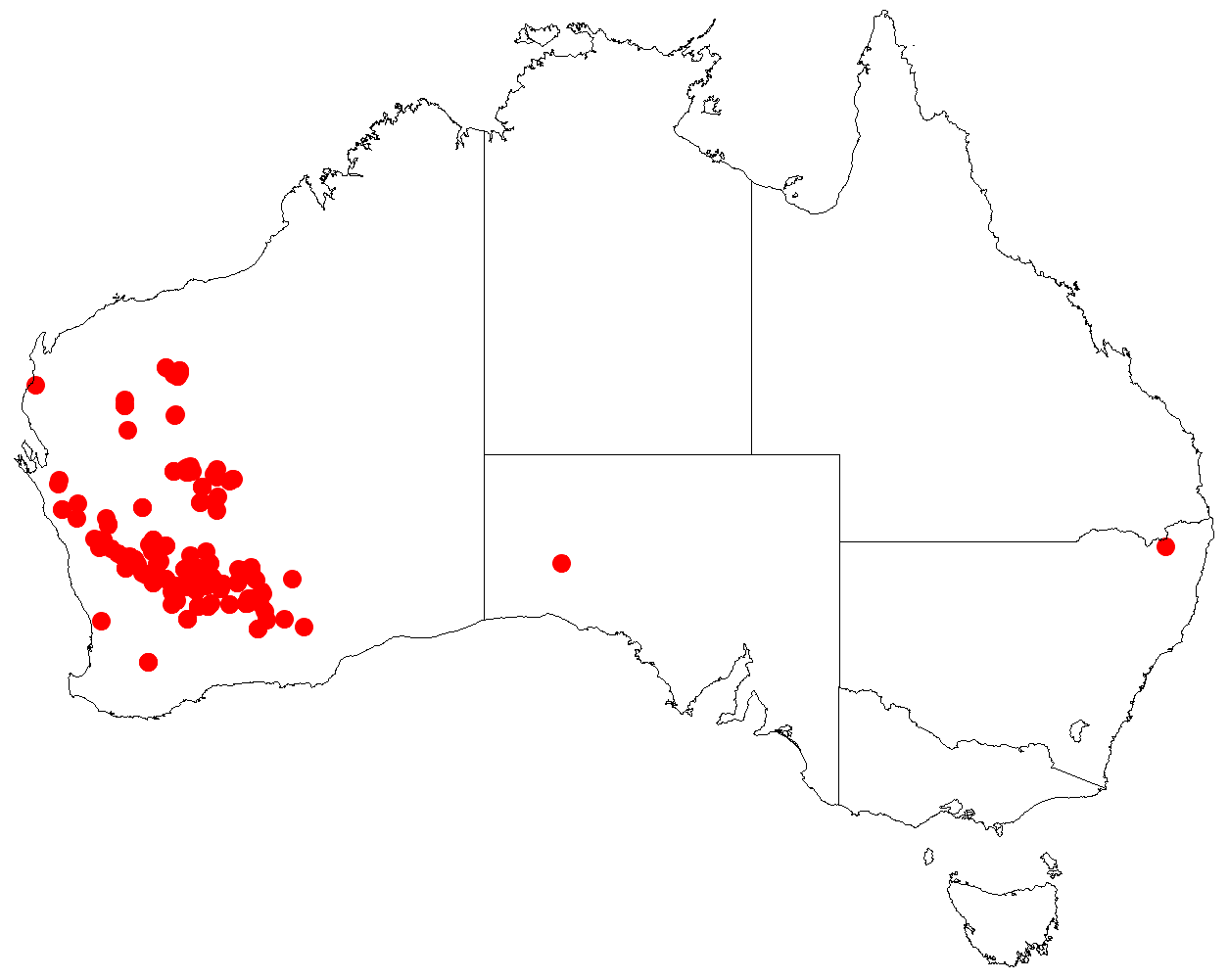
- Occurrence data from AVH

= Prostanthera campbellii =

Species of flowering plant

Prostanthera campbellii is a species of flowering plant in the family Lamiaceae and is endemic to the south-west of Western Australia. It is an erect shrub with linear leaves and white to cream-coloured flowers with purple striations.

== Description ==
Prostanthera campbellii is an erect shrub that typically grows to a height of 0.5–1.5 m (1 ft 8 in – 4 ft 11 in). The leaves are linear, yellowish green, 11–28 mm (0.43–1.10 in) long, 0.5–1.5 mm (0.020–0.059 in) wide and sessile. The flowers are arranged singly in two to sixteen upper leaf axils, each flower on a pedicel 1.5–3 mm (0.059–0.118 in) long. The sepals are green and form a tube 2–4 mm (0.079–0.157 in) long with two lobes, the lower lobe 1–3 mm (0.039–0.118 in) long and the upper lobe 2–6.5 mm (0.079–0.256 in) long. The petals are white to cream-coloured with purple striations near the base of the lobes, 6.5–10 mm (0.26–0.39 in) long and fused to form a tube 3–6 mm (0.12–0.24 in) long. The lower lip has three lobes, the centre lobe spatula-shaped, 2.5–4.5 mm (0.098–0.177 in) long and 2–4.5 mm (0.079–0.177 in) wide and the side lobes 2–4.5 mm (0.079–0.177 in) long and 1–3 mm (0.039–0.118 in) wide. The upper lip has two lobes 2–5 mm (0.079–0.197 in) long and 2–6.5 mm (0.079–0.256 in) wide. Flowering occurs from July to November.

== Taxonomy ==
Prostanthera campbellii was first formally described in 1882 by Ferdinand von Mueller in the journal Southern Science Record from specimens collected by John Forrest near the Gascoyne River. The specific epithet honours the politician Thomas Cockburn-Campbell.

== Distribution and habitat ==
This mintbush grows on granite outcrops and rocky places in the South-West and Eremaean botanical regions of Western Australia.

== Conservation status ==
Prostanthera campbellii is classified as "not threatened" by the Western Australian Government Department of Parks and Wildlife.
