= Sir John Campbell, of Airds =

Lieutenant Governor of Saint Vincent and the Grenadines

Sir John Campbell of Ardnamurchan and of Airds, called by courtesy 7th Baronet, of Ardnamurchan and Airds (27 November 1807 - Kingstown, Saint Vincent, Saint Vincent and the Grenadines, 18 January 1853) was a Scottish lawyer, landowner and Lieutenant Governor of Saint Vincent and the Grenadines.

== Ancestry ==
He was the only child of Lieutenant Colonel Sir John Campbell, of Airds, 6th Baronet by courtesy (15 March 1767 – 7 November 1834) and wife (m. 27 July 1803) Margaret Maxwell Campbell (c. 1776 - Woolwich, Kent, 19 August 1865), sixth daughter of John Campbell, Esq., of Lochend. Sir John Campbell, of Airds Bay, gained the rank of lieutenant colonel in the service of the Argyllshire and Bute Militia. In 1804 he claimed the baronetcy of Sir Donald Campbell, 1st Baronet, of Ardnamurchan and Airds, but this claim involves a descent from an illegitimate child.

== Career ==
Campbell qualified as an advocate in 1831 and inherited the Airds estate on the island of Lismore in Argyll from his father in 1834. He undertook agricultural improvements on the estate, including reclaiming waste land, draining and top dressing. However, the agricultural recession of the 1830s and the potato famine of the 1840s brought him into fanancial difficulties, and he appears to have been bankrupt by 1848.

He was appointed Lieutenant Governor of Saint Vincent and the Grenadines in 1845, in which office he served until his death at Kingstown on 18 January 1853. At that time, Saint Vincent was a British dominion, having been won from the French at the Treaty of Versailles in 1783 after changing hands more than once during the mid-18th century. As Lieutenant Governor he was the highest British authority on the island, the direct representative of the Queen.

== Title ==
Although Sir John claimed the Baronetcy of Campbell of Ardnamurchan and Airds, his father was the first to claim it as successor to Sir Donald Campbell, the 1st Baronet. The intervening heirs (the 2nd, 3rd, 4th, and 5th Baronets) did not assume the title. Although Sir John's father, himself, and his son considered themselves rightful heirs to the baronetcy, and used the title socially, the Standing Council of the Baronetage later refused to certify their claim. Eventually the baronetcy was re-created in 1913, but again fell dormant after the death of Sir John's grandson in 1943.

== Marriage and children ==
On 21 November 1833, he married Hannah Elizabeth Macleod (c. 1813 - Twickenham, 4 November 1873), the daughter of Lieutenant Colonel James Macleod, Esq., 10th of Raasay (d. 1824) and wife Flora Maclean. Their eldest son, John William Campbell succeeded him as 8th Baronet in 1853. He had at least another son, Lieutenant Colonel Frederick Campbell (15 June 1843 - Airds, Sydenham Hill, Surrey, 13 September 1926), who married at Christ Church, Paddington, London, on 28 January 1869 Emilie Guillamine Maclaine (c. 1847 - Airds, Sydenham Hill, Surrey, 21 July 1928). They were the parents of Sir Edward Campbell, 1st Baronet.

His great-great-great-great grandson is actor Jamie Campbell Bower. Another great-great-great-great-grandson is Ferdinand Zvonimir von Habsburg.

== Ancestry ==
Ancestors of Sir John Campbell, of Airds

8. Donald Campbell, of Airds (1704–1775)
4. John Campbell, of Airds (1736/7-1788)
18. Murdoch MacLean, 13th of Lochbuie (Abt 1672-1727)
9. Margaret MacLean (Abt 1708-?)
19. Anne Campbell (Abt 1676), granddaughter of James Stuart, 4th Earl of Moray
2. John Campbell, of Airds (1767–1834)
5. Jane Campbell (Abt 1737-1783)
1. John Campbell, of Airds
6. John Campbell, Esq., of Lochend
3. Margaret Maxwell Campbell, of Lochend (Abt 1776-1865)

== Sources ==
- George Edward Cokayne, editor, The Complete Baronetage, 5 volumes (no date (c. 1900); reprint, Gloucester, U.K.: Alan Sutton Publishing, 1983), volume II, pages 341 and 342.

Government offices
| Preceded by Richard Doherty | Lieutenant Governor of Saint Vincent; 1845–1853 | Succeeded by Richard Graves MacDonnell |
