= Battle of Wanat =

2008 battle of the War in Afghanistan

- Part of the War in Afghanistan (2001–2021)
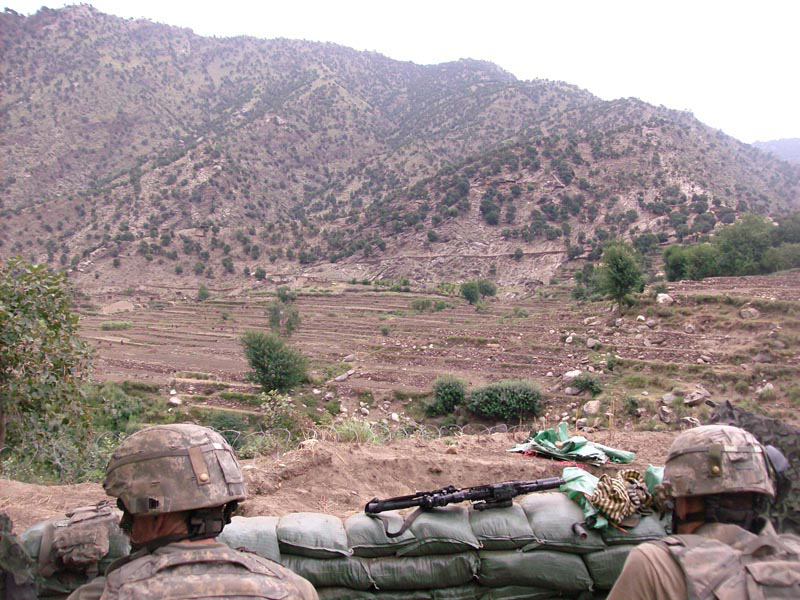
- U.S. Army soldiers guarding Vehicle Patrol Base Kahler the day before the battle.
Date	July 13, 2008
Location	Kunar Province, Afghanistan 35.0525°N 70.9075°E
Result	Initial American victory; later withdrawal See Aftermath

Belligerents
United States; Afghanistan	Taliban

Commanders and leaders
Cpt. Matthew Myer; Lt. Jonathan Brostrom †	Sheikh Dost Mohammad; Maulavi Uthman; Sadiq Munibullah

Units involved
U.S. Army; 173rd Airborne Brigade Combat Team; 2nd Battalion, 503rd Airborne; Chosen Company; 2nd Platoon; Afghan National Army	No specific units

Strength
48 soldiers 24 soldiers Close air support	200–500 insurgents

Casualties and losses
9 killed 27 wounded (Afghanistan) 4 wounded	U.S claim: 21–65 killed 45 wounded (Only 2 bodies were found)
- Location within Afghanistan

The Battle of Wanat took place on July 13, 2008, when around 200 Taliban insurgents attacked American troops stationed in the Waygal district of Afghanistan's far eastern Nuristan province. The distant position was primarily defended by United States Army soldiers with 2nd Platoon, Chosen Company, 2nd Battalion, 503rd Infantry Regiment (Airborne), 173rd Airborne Brigade Combat Team.

The Taliban encircled the remote base and its observation post, attacking it from mountains and surrounding farmland. They destroyed much of the US troops' heavy munitions, broke through their lines, and entered the main base before being finally repelled by artillery and aircraft. The US claimed to have killed at least 21 Taliban fighters for nine of its own soldiers killed and 27 wounded, together with four Afghan National Army (ANA) soldiers wounded.

One of several attacks on remote outposts, the Battle of Wanat has been described as among the bloodiest Taliban attacks of the war. In contrast to previous assaults, from roadside bombings to haphazard ambushes, this attack was well-coordinated; fighters across different insurgent groups were able to precisely target key equipment, such as a wire-guided missile launcher, through a sustained and disciplined effort.

The battle became the focus of debate in the US, generating "... a great deal of interest and scrutiny among military professionals and outside observers ..." mainly due to the relatively "... significant number of coalition casualties ..." Several investigations were launched into events leading up to the battle. The initial investigation was completed in August 2008. In July 2009, Senator James Webb requested that the US Army formally investigate the battle and previous investigation. Lieutenant general Richard F. Natonski conducted another investigation in late 2009 which led to orders of reprimand for the chain of command. In June 2010, the US Army revoked the reprimands. They stated that no negligence was involved and said of the soldiers that "... by their valor and their skill, they successfully defended their positions and defeated a determined, skillful, and adaptable enemy."

== Background ==
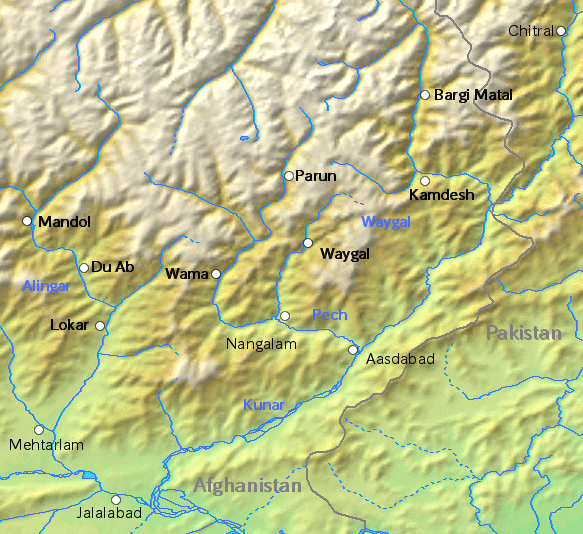
Waygal District in the Nuristan Province in Afghanistan

In 2008, NATO forces in southeastern Afghanistan deployed sub-company-sized patrols to the Pakistan border to disrupt supplies flowing to the Taliban from the Federally Administered Tribal Areas of Pakistan. They established small patrol bases, which came under regular attack by Taliban forces.

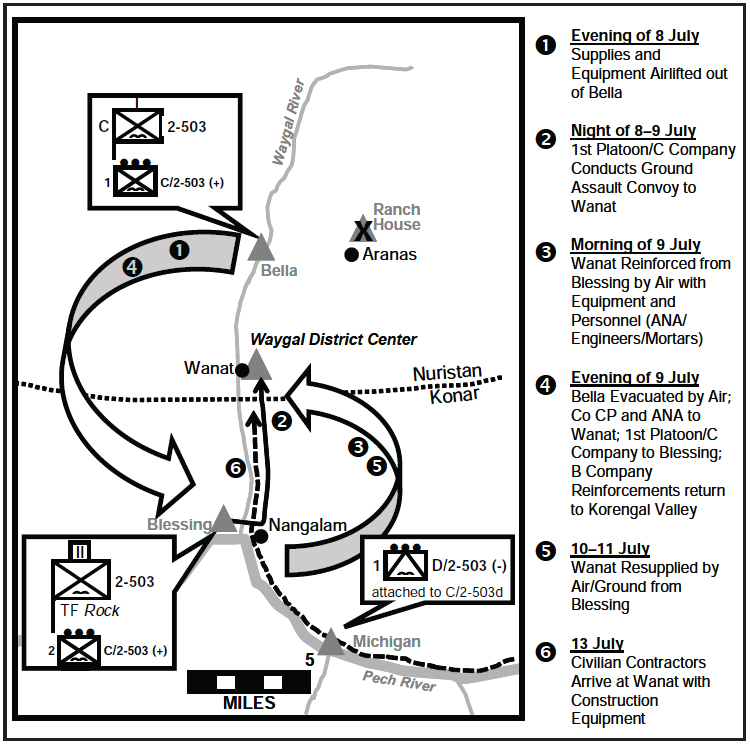
Rock Move OPLAN July 8–9, 2008. The result of the move was the establishment of a Coalition outpost at Wanat

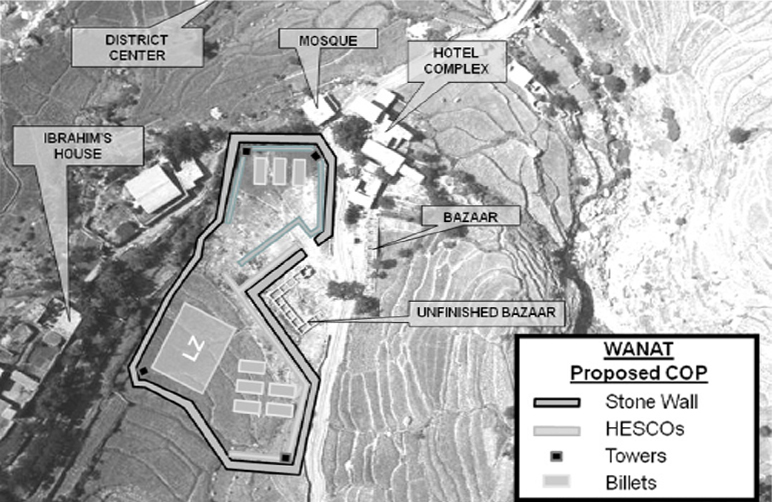
Proposal for COP at Wanat

In June, a small contingent of 72 troops, 48 American and 24 Afghan, were operating in and around Wanat, that was the center of the Waygal District government and about 5 miles (8.0 km) from the coalition military base Camp Blessing. On July 4, a US Army helicopter attacked vehicles they claimed were firing on them and killed 17 people. Both sides reported Forward Observation Base (FOB) Bella was under attack by indirect fire and small arms fire. The attack occurred in the middle of a multiple day relocation from Bella to Wanat designated Operation Rock Move that left the small base vulnerable. Moving quickly to take advantage, Taliban forces attempted to cut off a squad from the 19th Engineer Battalion that remained at Bella waiting to be extracted to Wanat. Staff sergeant Todd Barfield, Specialist Benjamin Bond, Private first class (Pfc.) Jason Vails, Pfc. Randall Durry and Pfc. Todd Wile, with the help of artillery support from Camp Blessing were able to successfully defend Bella against multiple attacks by Taliban forces. Intelligence reports said that the FOB was going to be overrun from within the base as well. Intelligence received afterwards claimed that the attack was in response to the July 4th helicopter attack that left a reported 17 civilians dead. American Reports claimed that the helicopter attack was in response to the indirect fire received from a mortar tube that was being fired from the bed of a Toyota Hilux pick-up.. The initial Taliban radio transmissions that were intercepted reported that the "... big gun [mortar tube] had been hit ..." and the Taliban commander had been killed. A few hours after the helicopter attacked, with the Chosen Company commander and the troops in contact confirming the targets, the Taliban radio reports changed to "... they killed the shop keeper [that had the same name as the Taliban commander], the big gun was not damaged." Tension between American forces and Afghan Army forces were already high after Sfc. Matthew Kahler was killed by an Afghan Army soldier earlier in January. While the killing was officially ruled an accident, the US soldiers considered it intentional.

Five days before the battle, on July 8, a platoon from the Second Battalion, 503rd Infantry Regiment, 173rd Airborne Brigade Combat Team established Vehicle Patrol Base (VPB) Kahler and a separate observation post called OP Top Side near Wanat. 2nd Platoon, Chosen Company, departed from Camp Blessing after sunset in a ground assault convoy for the 90-minute-long drive to Wanat. The convoy contained five M1114 armored Humvees. There was one for each of the three rifle squads, a vehicle for platoon headquarters, and the last vehicle containing the TOW missile squad. The Humvees mounted heavy weapons, two with 50-cal machine guns, and two with MK-19 40mm automatic grenade launchers in protected cupolas to provide extra firepower and protection. Their goal was to create a Combat Outpost (COP) to connect with and provide security for the local populace, coordinate $1.4 million in reconstruction projects, and disrupt Taliban activity. The brigade was to be relieved by a newly arriving US Army unit in two weeks.

The patrol base was situated in an open field about 300 meters long by 100 meters wide surrounded on two sides by buildings which composed the Quam. On July 9, a six-man engineer squad arrived by Chinook helicopter. They brought a Bobcat loader and a shipping container with engineering equipment. The soldiers reinforced the base with existing terrain, sandbags, barbed wire, and used the Bobcat to fill a number of HESCO barriers (essentially wall-sized sandbags) around the three squad positions and to create a firing pit for the big 120-mm mortar. However, the Bobcat broke down for one day, and could not lift high enough to place barriers to a 7-foot (2.1 m) height. The barriers were placed at just a 4-foot (1.2 m) level, which would make it vulnerable to direct fire from guns or rockets which the attackers would exploit. The troops dug many of the fortifications and trenches with hand shovels. Still in preparation at the time of the attack, some areas were only protected by a barrier of concertina wire, but with no posts or stakes; the wire was simply stretched out on the ground.

The Afghan company contracted to bring heavy construction equipment delayed its arrival until July 13. It was decided that soldier labor – with the aid of an engineer squad and the Bobcat already at Bella – would be good enough to prepare an initial defense in the six days until heavier equipment arrived. The number of men at the base was judged adequate to defend against intelligence estimates that placed the insurgent forces in the local area at about 150 experienced fighters, though they did not know that attackers would be backed up by other guerrilla groups from neighboring regions as far away as Pakistan and Kashmir. While they thought it was possible the base might be attacked while the camp was being prepared, they thought it unlikely. Platoon sergeant Dzwik later remarked "I was expecting harassing fire from any one of the high ground in every direction. I did not think the village itself would let the AAF [Anti-Afghan Force] turn their village into a battle zone.

Soldiers at the base noticed warning signs, including groups of men watching the construction from the nearby village, which was set at a higher elevation than the outpost, and other groups of men moving through nearby mountains. At a dinner meeting in the village, a villager told the Americans that they should shoot any men seen in the mountains, and asked them if US UAVs were keeping watch nearby. The day before the attack, militants began flowing water through an irrigation ditch feeding an unused field, creating background noise that masked the sounds of the advancing fighters.

Although the Americans believed that 100 or 200 Taliban attacked the base, a senior Afghan defense ministry official who did not reveal his name told Al Jazeera that he had information it was between 400 and 500 fighters. Tamim Nuristani, former governor of Nuristan, believed that numerous Taliban and Pakistani militant and terrorist groups banded together from surrounding regions including Kunar and the Bajaur tribal agency in neighboring Pakistan. According to US intelligence, groups operating in the region included Taliban, al-Qaeda, Kashmir-based Lashkar-e-Taiba and Pakistan-based (as of 2013 still located in one of many strongholds in the Bajaur agency of FATA (Federally Administered Tribal Areas in Kunar and Nuristan of Afghanistan)) Hezb-i-Islami. According to the Long War Journal, al-Qaeda's senior leadership, including Ayman al-Zawahiri and Osama bin Laden, were thought to shelter in the region (Bin Laden was actually in Pakistan at the time). A NATO spokesman believed that the Taliban had moved into and expelled a nearby Khel (small village-tribe subdivision) for the attack. On the evening of July 12, Taliban soldiers moved into Wanat and ordered the villagers to leave. Undetected by ISAF and the ANA, they set up firing positions inside Kors and a mosque next to and overlooking the perimeter.

== Battle ==
A U.S. Army dramatization of the battle.

About 04:20 on July 13, Taliban forces opened fire on the base with machine guns, rocket-propelled grenades (RPGs), and mortars. Another 100 militants attacked the observation post from farmland to the east.

The initial attack hit the forward operating base's mortar pit, defended by Sgt. Erich Phillips, Spc. Sergio Abad, Pfc. Scott Stenoski, Sgt. Hector Chavez, Sgt. Israel Garcia PFC Ronnie L Garza and Corporal Jason Hovater, knocking out the 120 mm mortar and detonating the stockpile of mortar ammunition. The insurgents next destroyed the Humvee-mounted TOW missile launcher inside the combat outpost with coordinated fire from unguided RPG rockets. In short order, the base's two heaviest weapons were knocked out, with the subsequent mortar explosion hurling anti-tank missiles into the command base's post.

From the U.S. perspective, Ssgt. David Dzwik and First lieutenant Jonathan Brostrom quickly realized that the most serious situation was the attack concentrated on a small team situated at the small observation post known as "TOPSIDE," defended by Forward Observer Sgt. Ryan M. Pitts, Spc.Tyler Stafford, Spc. Gunnar Zwilling, Cpl. Jonathan Ayers, Spc. Chris Mckaig, Spc. Jason Bogar PFC Garza and Spc. Pruitt Rainey. TOPSIDE sat nestled among rocks under a tree 50m to 70m outside the main base. The first round hit accurately, wounding or stunning every soldier present. Pfc. Tyler Stafford was blown out of his machine-gun position next to Spc. Matthew Phillips and others, who continued to throw grenades at attackers before Phillips was mortally wounded. Cpl. Jason Bogar, fired hundreds of rounds from his automatic weapon until it jammed, before attending to Stafford's wounds. After an RPG wounded Pitts, Bogar applied a tourniquet to his leg, before manning two other machine guns. Bogar then jumped from the outpost bunker to get close enough to kill insurgents who were firing down upon the men from the village hotel. Once outside the bunker, Bogar was shot through the chest and killed. 1Lt. Brostrom and Cpl. Hovater arrived to help defend TOPSIDE. The surviving soldiers then ran from the outpost to the main post, leaving Pitts behind. Alone, Pitts was able to hold-off the Taliban from overrunning the position until their comrades returned two hours later and they were evacuated to receive medical care.

Four US soldiers were killed within the first 20 minutes of the battle — another died later — and at least three others were wounded. Three times, teams of soldiers from the main base ran through Taliban fire to resupply the observation post and carry back the dead and wounded.

The US troops responded with machine guns, grenades, and claymore mines. Artillery guns at Camp Blessing fired 96 155 mm artillery rounds. The Taliban briefly breached the wire of the observation post before being driven back. After almost half an hour of intense fighting at the observation post, Medic Pfc. William Hewitt was shot in the arm with Spc. Jeff Scantlin, trained as a Combat Lifesaver, taking over medic duties. Eventually, only two soldiers Garza — Pitts — remained. They were seriously wounded and fought alone until reinforcements arrived. Some militants also managed to get past the main base's eastern barriers. Two US soldiers, platoon leader 1Lt Jonathan P. Brostrom, 24, of Hawaii and Cpl. Jason Hovater, were killed trying to deliver ammunition to the observation post. US soldiers were at times flushed out of their fortifications by what they thought were grenades, but which were actually rocks thrown by the attackers. Brostrom, Hovater, and another soldier may have been killed by an insurgent who penetrated the wire perimeter. Pvt. William Krupa, Spc. Adam Hamby and Sgt. Brian Hissong took heavy fire while defending the TCP with the .50-Cal that was mounted on a Humvee.

AH-64 Apache attack helicopters and a Predator unmanned aircraft drone armed with Hellfire missiles arrived over the base about 30 minutes after the battle began. During the battle, US soldiers were resupplied by UH-60 Blackhawk helicopter with fire support from the AH-64 Apaches. Wounded troops were evacuated to nearby Camp Wright, where members of E Troop, 2/17th Cavalry, 101st Airborne Division would wait to rearm and refuel the UH-60s and AH-64s. Later, a B-1B Lancer bomber, A-10, and F-15E Strike Eagle aircraft were called in. The militants withdrew about four hours later. After the militants retreated, mop up operations followed, and the Taliban withdrew from the town.

Nine US soldiers were killed in the attack: Spc. Sergio S. Abad, Cpl. Jonathan R. Ayers, Cpl. Jason M. Bogar, Sgt. Israel Garcia, Cpl. Jason D. Hovater, Cpl. Matthew B. Phillips, Cpl. Pruitt A. Rainey, and Cpl. Gunnar W. Zwilling and 1Lt. Jonathan Brostrom. Most of the casualties occurring in the observation post. Between 21 and 65 militants were reported killed with another 20 to 40 wounded, but coalition forces found only two Taliban bodies after the battle. The attack was the highest death toll for U.S. troops in the country since Operation Red Wings three years earlier.

== Operational issues ==
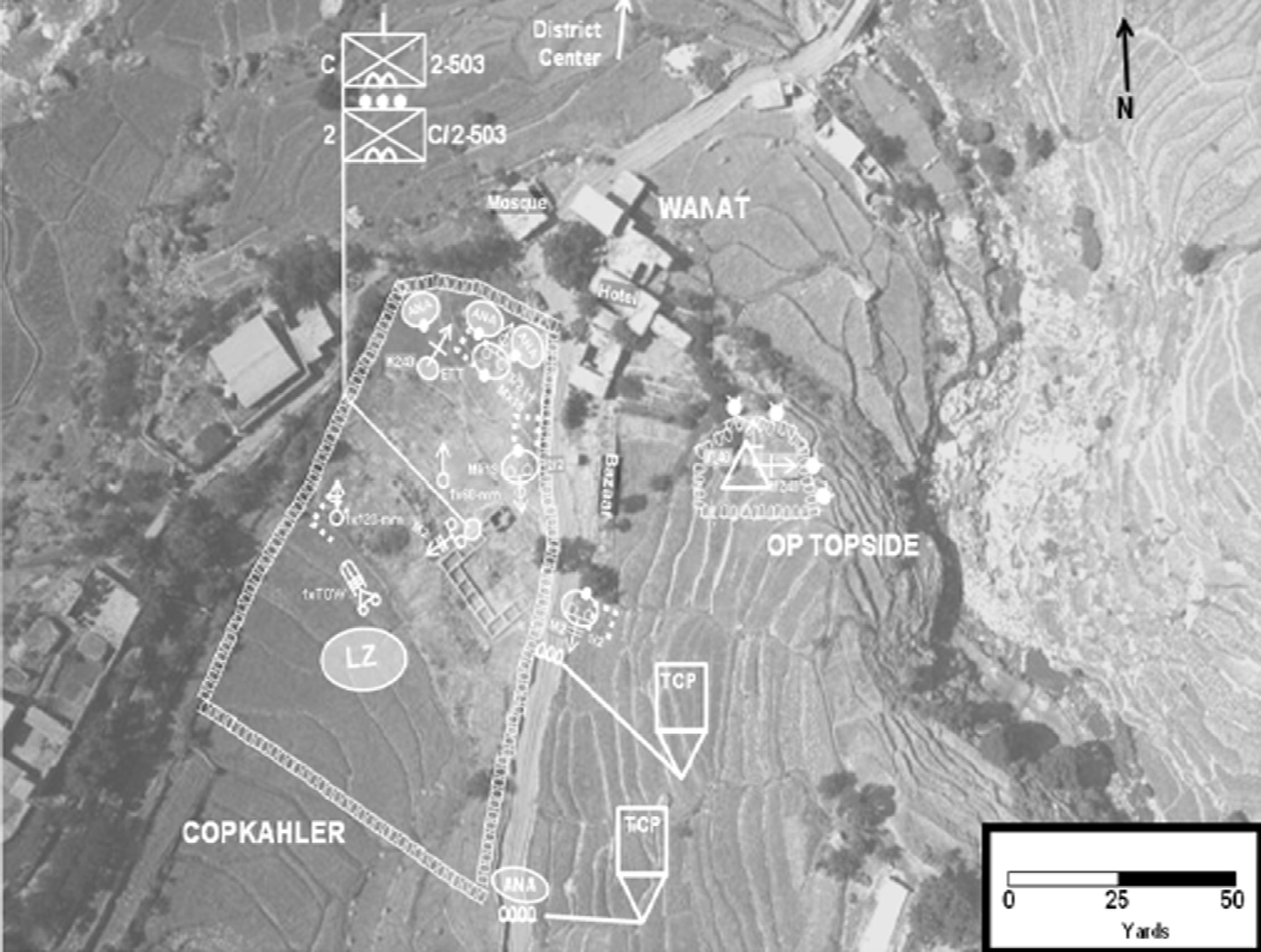
Combat Outpost Kahler – July 13, 2008. Observation post is to the upper right of the main camp with buildings and mosque at and overlooking the edge of the northern perimeter

Civilian deaths caused by allied operations had increased sympathy among Waygal residents for the Taliban, who were allowed to move into the Quam. The residents may have been further dismayed by the failure of the Afghan president, Hamid Karzai, to address the concerns of a delegation of elders and maliks in Kabul two days previously.

Coalition troops had noticed other warning signs. The day before the attack, the "Spin Giris" (Pashto for "White Beards" – influential tribal elders) of Wanat conducted a Jirga, an elder community council (experienced male members of the Quam have a right to attend), without the post's Officer-in-Charge. Additionally, the villagers began pouring waste water into an area of dead space near the post more frequently which may have concealed the movement of militants within the village.

A 2009 US Army report criticized the brigade commander, Colonel Chip Preysler, and the battalion commander, Lieutenant colonel William Ostlund, citing the lack of supplies, equipment, and drinking water for troops stationed in Wanat. At the same time, the report praised the performance of its soldiers under fire.

The same report criticized the actions of the involved commanding officers as being counterproductive to military goals, stating that "The highly kinetic approach favored by TF Rock ... rapidly and inevitably degraded the relationships between the U.S. Army and the Waigal population."

This statement, portraying the operational approaches of the 173rd Airborne Brigade (TF Bayonet) and 2-503 PIR (TF Rock) in a negative light, is contradicted by David Kilcullen in his book, The Accidental Guerrilla. Kilcullen stated that in March 2008,

The fact that Kunar has bucked the general trend [downward trend in security across the country] seems largely to be the result of a consistent U.S. strategy of partnering with local communities to separate the insurgents from the people, bring tangible benefits of governance and development to the population, and help the population choose their own local Khan's (Protectors, usually military), through elections.

Kilcullen also noted a statement by a previous U.S. commander in Kunar regarding LTC William Ostlund, the 2-503 commander: "Bill O. understood deeply that the effect of Coalition operations on the people was the key question."

== Aftermath ==
=== US withdrawal ===
After the battle, Major general Jeffrey J. Schloesser, US Army commander of coalition troops in Regional Command East, Afghanistan, decided to abandon the patrol base and sent additional US troops to assist the base evacuation. Three days after the engagement the US and Afghan forces withdrew from Wanat. An ISAF statement said ISAF and Afghan security forces "... will continue to perform regular patrols near the village of Wanat." The coalition forces continued to maintain a larger patrol base about four miles away from Wanat and concentrated on protecting the larger Pech River Valley.

The district police force for the area was disarmed by the Americans and the district chief and police chief were briefly detained and questioned. Both were released within 24 hours, according to a spokesperson for the district chief.

Speaking at a Pentagon news conference after the attack, US Chairman of the Joint Chiefs of Staff, Admiral Michael Mullen said the incident indicated that "... all involved with operations on the (Pakistan-Afghanistan, especially the porous Kunar, Kashmir, and Nuristan), border must do a better job of policing the region and eliminating the extremists' safe havens in Pakistan's federally administered tribal areas that are launching pads for attacks on coalition forces." The Associated Press reported that the attack underscored a general gain in strength of Afghan insurgents.

However, the 173rd Brigade Commander, Colonel Charles "Chip" Preysler, specifically rebutted that conclusion in an interview on July 20, 2008. He stated that previous media accounts of the engagement mischaracterized the level of development of the platoon's defences. He also said that the withdrawal of the platoon did not constitute "abandoning" the position because no permanent defensive infrastructure was developed or left behind. He further stated that the position was "... not overrun in any shape, manner, or form ...", adding that, "It was close combat to be sure – hand grenade range."

=== U.S. Army investigation ===
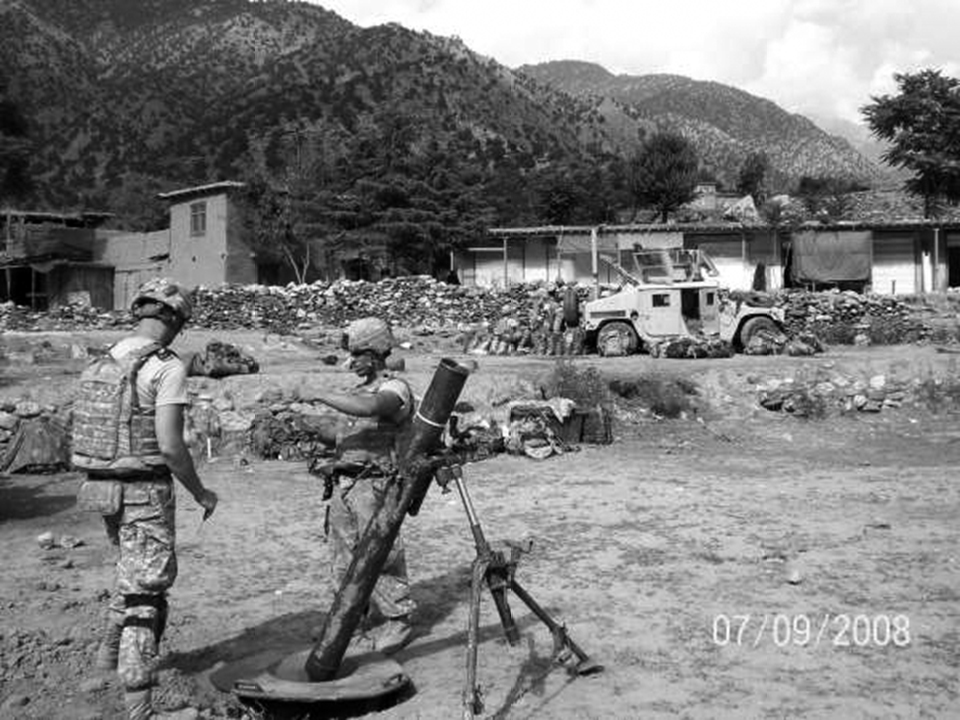
View of Wanat COP looking east from mortar position with 2nd Squad position, the bazaar and OP Topside's later location in the background, July 9, 2008.

An investigation by the US Army, completed on August 13 and released to the public the first week of November 2008, found that the Taliban fighters had been assisted by the Afghan local police (ALP), forces and a district leader. The evidence included large stocks of weapons and ammunition discovered in the police barracks in Wanat after the battle. The stocks were much more than could be used by the villages' 20-man police force and included dirty weapons which appeared to have been used recently. In response to the report, Schloesser concluded that the governor and local police chief "... had probably been acting under duress and had been cooperative with American troops." The governor was absolved of blame in the attack, but it was unclear about what was done with the local police chief.

The investigation also examined whether the Army had intelligence about a possible assault and whether the troops had access to it. The report found that – despite reports earlier in July that 200 to 300 insurgents had been massing to attack another remote outpost in the vicinity, including numerous reports from local villagers that an attack was imminent, the commanders at Wanat had no reason to expect such a large frontal assault. The report, however, criticized the "... incredible amount of time ..." – 10 months – it took NATO military leaders to negotiate arrangements over the site of the outpost, giving the Taliban plenty of time to coordinate and plan an attack on the base.

=== Further actions ===
In July 2009, US Senator James Webb asked the US DoD Inspector General to formally examine the battle and the U.S. Army's investigation into the event. In his request, Webb cited an unreleased report from the Army's Combat Studies Institute (CSI) by a contractor, Douglas Cubbison, that criticized how senior Army leaders in Afghanistan, especially Ostlund and Preysler, acted before the assault at Wanat. According to that report, soldiers at the Wanat base were critically short of basic necessities such as water and sandbags and had complained repeatedly, to no avail, that their base was in a precarious position. Cubbison had written the report at the request of Lieutenant general William B. Caldwell IV, commander of the United States Army Combined Arms Center. Cubbison wrote that a few days before the battle, on July 4, a US Army helicopter mistakenly attacked and killed 17 civilians, including all of the doctors and nurses at a local clinic, infuriating local Afghans. Platoon leader Brostrom and company commander Captain Matthew Myer told their commanders that they expected a retaliatory attack and asked for extra surveillance. Brostrom's father, retired Army Colonel David. P. Brostrom, alerted Webb's office to the Army historian's report and became a vocal critic of the chain of command. Said Brostrom, "After I read the report, I was sick to my stomach."

Letters of reprimand were issued to Colonel Charles Preysler, Lieutenant colonel William Ostlund and Captain Myer for "... failing to properly prepare defenses ..." at Wanat, Pentagon officials said March 12. That same month, Myer was awarded the Silver Star for his actions during the battle of Wanat.

On September 30, 2009, US Central Command commander General David H. Petraeus appointed U.S. Marine Corps Lieutenant general Richard F. Natonski to lead a new inquiry into the battle and which would look into related issues "... beyond the tactical level ..." A later review was conducted by General Charles C. Campbell which "... focused on the totality of circumstances that included and affected actions at Wanat," including interviews of the officers involved, and reviews of previous investigations with the exception of the CSI narrative – stating that it had "... not undergone pre-publication vetting and academic review in accordance with standing CSI research protocols." Campbell concluded that the officers involved were not at fault:

[The officers] were neither negligent nor derelict in the performance of their duties, exercising a degree of care that a reasonably prudent person would have exercised under the same or similar circumstance. To criminalize command decisions in a theater of complex combat operations is a grave step indeed. It is also unnecessary, particularly in this case. It is possible for officers to err in judgment – and to thereby incur censure – without violating a criminal statute. This is particularly true where the errors are those of omission, where the standards come from multiple non-punitive doctrinal publications, where there is less than complete and certain knowledge of enemy capabilities and intent, and where commanders enjoy wide discretion in their exercise of their command prerogatives and responsibilities.

In June 2010, General Campbell revoked the officers' reprimands, citing that they would have a "chilling effect" on ground operations. The Army said that the second look at the incident proved that the officers were "... neither negligent nor derelict ..." and "... by their valor and their skill, they successfully defended their positions and defeated a determined, skillful, and adaptable enemy who masses and attacks at times, ways and places of his choosing." Secretary of the Army John McHugh was also humbled by their courage, stating "We remain grateful for and humbled by their extraordinary courage and valor." Gen. George W. Casey Jr., Army chief of staff further commended the performance of the soldiers:

In every review and study conducted to date, the courage, valor, and discipline of the soldiers who fought at Wanat have been universally praised. These soldiers were well-trained, well-led, and fought bravely to defeat a determined and intense enemy action to overrun their base in Wanat. They persevered in a fashion that deserves broad recognition of their bravery and tenacity. Our hearts go out to the families of the fallen soldiers.

Upset over Campbell's decision, family members of those killed in action wrote a letter to the Secretary of the Army asking that the findings of Natonski's investigation be upheld and the reprimands reinstated. In addition to the family members, the letter was signed by Senators Daniel Akaka, Jim Webb, Saxby Chambliss, Patty Murray, and Claire McCaskill.

In November 2010, the CSI published a historical account of the Battle of Wanat. The official US Army history of the battle, published in December 2010, places little blame on the senior officers involved, instead blaming the uncertain nature of war, mistakes by junior officers, lack of knowledge by Army officers on the Wanat region's complex political situation, and lack of intelligence that the attack forces would be drawn from the entire region, not just the local area.

== Decorations ==
=== Medal of Honor ===
Ryan M. Pitts was awarded the Medal of Honor on July 21, 2014, for actions on July 13, 2008, during the battle. As part of the 173rd Airborne Brigade, Sergeant Pitts served as a Forward Observer. Along with Salvatore Giunta and Kyle J. White, Pitts was the third recipient of the Medal of Honor from 2nd Battalion, 503rd Infantry Regiment. Pitts was medically discharged in 2009.

== See also ==
- Restrepo, a film made by reporters embedded into a similar observation post in the Korengal Valley. The Battle of Wanat is mentioned in the film when Battle Company hears the news of their sister company's losses.
- Battle of Nam Dong, a 1964 battle in the Vietnam War where communist forces failed to overrun a South Vietnamese and US special forces camp. The battle was dramatized in the 1968 film The Green Berets.
- New Year's Day battle of 1968, a battle during the Vietnam War in which communist forces came close to overrunning a US Army fire support base. The battle was dramatized in the final action sequence in the 1986 Hollywood film Platoon.
- Battle for Hill 3234, a 1988 battle in the Soviet–Afghan War where Soviet paratroopers repelled Afghan insurgent forces. The battle was dramatized in the 2005 film The 9th Company.
- Battle of Kamdesh, a 2009 battle 20 miles from Wanat, the bloodiest battle for U.S. forces since the Battle of Wanat. An assault by 300 Taliban fighters resulted in eight Americans killed and 22 wounded, and prompt withdrawal from nearly destroyed base. The battle was dramatized in the 2019 film The Outpost.
