= George Shenton =

Australian politician (1842–1909)

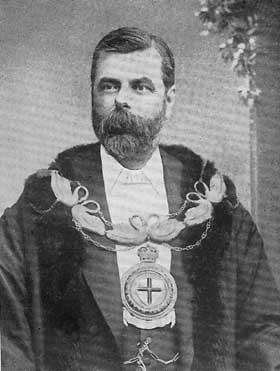
- Sir George Shenton

2nd President of the Western Australian Legislative Council
- In office 11 October 1892 – 11 May 1906
- Preceded by: Thomas Cockburn-Campbell
- Succeeded by: Henry Briggs

Member of the Western Australian Legislative Council for Metropolitan Province
- In office July 1894 – 21 May 1906
- Preceded by: Constituency established
- Succeeded by: Charles Sommers

Member of the Western Australian Legislative Council for Greenough
- In office 12 October 1870 – 29 July 1873
- Preceded by: Constituency established
- Succeeded by: Charles Crowther

Personal details
- Born: 4 March 1842 Perth, Western Australia, Australia
- Died: 29 June 1909 (aged 67) London, England, United Kingdom
- Resting place: Norwood Cemetery
- Spouse: Julia Theresa Eichbaum (m. 1868)
- Children: 10
- Parent: George Shenton Sr. (father)
- Education: Wesleyan Collegiate Institute
- Profession: Entrepreneur, politician

Sir George Shenton (4 March 1842 – 29 June 1909) was a prominent businessman in colonial Western Australia, the first Mayor of Perth, and a Member of the Western Australian Legislative Council for over thirty years.

== Early and family life ==
George Shenton was born in Perth, Western Australia on 4 March 1842, the eldest son of George Shenton Sr, a wealthy businessman who was Perth's first pharmacist. Shenton Jnr was educated locally until 1855, when at the age of 13 he was sent to England to complete his education at the Wesleyan Collegiate Institute (Queen's College) in Taunton. In 1858 he returned to Perth, where he received experience working in a range of his father's businesses, including running his father's store in Geraldton, and managing the family's farm on the Greenough River.

On 4 November 1868, Shenton married Julia Theresa Eichbaum in a ceremony at Fremantle.

== Business activities ==
On 5 March 1867, Shenton Snr drowned when his schooner, The Lass of Geraldton, capsized off Mandurah in a storm. Shenton Jnr then took over his father's businesses. The Shenton family's businesses continued to prosper over the next thirty years, but as Shenton became more involved in politics he had less time to invest in his business activities. From 1884, his youngest brother Ernest gradually took over the running of the Perth store, and another brother, Edward, took the Geraldton business as his inheritance. This left George with responsibility for the shipping business that his father had established.

Shenton ran a number of coastal vessels in partnership with John Monger, and the two men had some of the best-known sailing ships of the era. He exported substantial quantities of wool, timber, sandalwood and minerals to London, and pioneered Western Australia's trade with Singapore. He was an agent for a number of firms, including Lloyd's of London, and Felgate's, a London company that controlled most of Western Australia's trade with Britain in the 1870s.

George Shenton also invested profitably in gold mining. He was a member of the syndicate that financed Leslie Menzie's 1894 prospecting expedition that resulted in the discovery of the Menzies gold field. The first lease became the famous Lady Shenton mine, which yielded over 130,000 ounces of gold and paid out over £150,000 in dividends. Shenton later became a shareholder and director of the Gold Estates Mining Company.

Shenton became a director of a number of local companies, and was Chairman of Directors of the Western Australian Bank from 1886 until his death. On the establishment of a Perth Chamber of Commerce in 1890, he became its first president.

In 1886, Shenton appointed H. F. Payne to manage his shipping agency. As he became increasingly involved in politics, his involvement in his shipping business decreased, and he came to rely more and more heavily on Payne. In 1903 he merged his company with the South Australian company Elder Smiths, to form a new company under the name Elder Shenton and Co. Ltd. This company survives today as the well-known Australian rural services provider Elders Limited. George Shenton became a principal shareholder and Chairman of Directors of the new company, but was largely uninvolved in the day-to-day running of the firm.

== Political career ==
In 1867, the same year that he took over his father's businesses, Shenton was elected to the Perth City Council. He would remain a member of the council until 1888. From 1875 to 1877, he was chairman of the council, and when Perth became a mayoralty in 1880, he became the first Mayor of Perth. Shenton was Mayor until 1884, and again from 1886 to 1888. His major contribution to Perth during this time was the macadamizing and kerbing of the city's roads.

Western Australia gained representative government in 1870, and in October of that year the first Western Australian Legislative Council elections were held. On 12 October 1870, George Shenton was elected unopposed to the seat of Greenough. The main political issue of the day was that of free trade versus protection. In accordance with the wishes of his constituents, Shenton took a protectionist stance, helping to push for an import duty on flour. This was opposed by the governor, Sir Frederick Weld, and when the Legislative Council successfully moved an amendment on the matter, Weld responded by dissolving the Council in March 1872. Shenton was then re-elected for Greenough, comfortably defeating his opponent, Geraldton merchant Henry Gray.

Shenton was absent from the colony during the 1872 election, and his campaign was run by his friend Charles Crowther, who ran the Greenough Hotel. On the evening following the election, Crowther held a supper and ball for Shenton's supporters. Although "treating the electors" was a common practice at the time, Gray lodged a complaint alleging that Crowther had bribed the electorate. In July 1873, the Supreme Court upheld Gray's complaint, finding that Crowther's actions might have induced electors to vote for Shenton. No blame was attached to Shenton, but his election was declared void. Shenton then declined to stand for election again, so Crowther himself did so, heavily defeating Gray.

On 10 November 1875, Shenton was again elected to the Legislative Council, this time defeating Andrew Dempster for the seat of Toodyay. He would hold the seat until the advent of responsible government in October 1890. As member for Toodyay, Shenton continued to favour protectionism, and staunchly opposed responsible self-government. As support for self-government grew, however, Shenton became less vocal on the subject, and when a crucial resolution on the subject was carried 13 votes to 4 in 1887, Shenton abstained from voting. Thereafter he ceased opposing responsible self-government, and in 1889, he was re-elected on a platform of immediate self-government under a compromise constitution.

Under responsible government, Western Australia adopted a bicameral legislature, with an elective Legislative Assembly as its "lower house", and the nominative Legislative Council as its "upper house". Shenton decided not to stand for election to the Assembly, and was instead nominated to the Council, thereupon becoming Father of the House. His stated reason for entering the upper house rather than the lower house was that it would take up less of his time, but when the first Premier of Western Australia, Sir John Forrest, invited Shenton to join his Cabinet Ministry as Colonial Secretary, he accepted.

As Colonial Secretary and the only Government minister in the upper house, Shenton had an extremely heavy workload. When the prestigious and far less demanding office of President of the Legislative Council became available in 1892, he immediately resigned from Cabinet to offer himself for election to the position. The following year he was appointed Knight Bachelor.

In July 1894, the Legislative Council became elective, and Shenton was elected to a Metropolitan Province seat. He held the seat and the Presidency of the Legislative Council until his retirement in May 1906.

== Later life ==
Shenton's health was failing when he retired in 1906, and he lived for only three more years, dying in London on 29 June 1909. He was buried in West Norwood Cemetery. His estate at his death was valued at £186,627.

== Cultural references ==
George Shenton is honoured by the Perth suburb Shenton Park. His home, named Crawley Park by a previous owner, was situated on a 200-acre (0.81 km^{2}) site much of which is now the site of the University of Western Australia. The suburb Crawley is named after Shenton's land. The Crawley Park homestead in which Shenton lived, now known as Shenton House, still stands in the University Grounds, and is managed by the National Trust of Australia.

Western Australian Legislative Council
Preceded by Constituency created	Member for Greenough; 1870-1873	Succeeded by Charles Crowther
Preceded by Constituency created	Member for Metropolitan Province; 1894-1906	Succeeded by Charles Sommers
Preceded by Thomas Cockburn-Campbell	President of the Western Australian Legislative Council; 1892–1906	Succeeded by Henry Briggs
