= Chaytor baronets of Croft and Witton Castle (1831) =

Escutcheon of the Chaytor baronets of Witton Castle and Croft

The Chaytor baronetcy, of Croft in the County of York and of Witton Castle in the County of Durham, was created in the Baronetage of the United Kingdom on 30 September 1831 for William Chaytor, an industrialist and Whig politician who served as MP for Richmond in the first Reform Parliament. He named Clervaux Castle, Yorkshire, which he had built in 1842 but which was demolished in 1951, after his Anglo-Norman Clervaux ancestors, of whom his family were the heirs.

He was son of William Chaytor of Croft and Spenningthorne, Member of Parliament for Hedon (UK Parliament constituency); his great-grandfather, Henry Chaytor (c. 1638 – 1719) was brother to Sir William Chaytor, 1st Baronet of the first creation.

He was succeeded by his eldest son William Richard Carter Chaytor, the second baronet, who represented Durham in the House of Commons. His grandson, William Henry Edward Chaytor, the fourth baronet, was High Sheriff of County Durham in 1902 and a Deputy Lieutenant of the county. He died unmarried at an early age and was succeeded by his younger brother, Walter Clervaux Chaytor, the fifth baronet, who served as a Justice of the Peace.

The fifth baronet also died at a young age and was succeeded by his younger brother, Edmund Hugh Chaytor, the sixth baronet. Sir Edmund's wife, Isobel, was a socialite who went travelling in Syria and flew to Australia to lecture on fashion. On the death of his only son, William Henry Clervaux Chaytor, the seventh Baronet, in 1976, the line of the third baronet failed. The presumed eighth baronet, his successor, was his second cousin George Reginald Chaytor, son of William Richard Carter Chaytor, eldest son of Reginald Clervaux Chaytor, son of the second marriage of the second baronet. He never proved his succession and was never on the Official Roll of the Baronetage. As of 2019, the presumed ninth baronet was his first cousin once removed, Bruce Gordon Chaytor.

Major-General Sir Edward Chaytor, commander of New Zealand troops in the Boer War and First World War, was the grandson of John Clervaux Chaytor, second son of the first baronet.

== Chaytor baronets, of Witton Castle and Croft (1831) ==
- Sir William Chaytor, 1st Baronet (1771–1847)
- Sir William Richard Carter Chaytor, 2nd Baronet (1805–1871)
- Sir William Chaytor, 3rd Baronet (1837–1896)
- Sir William Henry Edward Chaytor, 4th Baronet (1867–1908)
- Sir Walter Clervaux Chaytor, 5th Baronet (1874–1913)
- Sir Edmund Hugh Chaytor, 6th Baronet (1876–1935)
- Sir William Henry Clervaux Chaytor, 7th Baronet (1914–1976)
- George Reginald Chaytor, presumed 8th Baronet (1912–1999)
- Bruce Gordon Chaytor, presumed 9th Baronet (born 1949) The Official Roll marks the title as dormant.

The heir apparent to the presumed 9th Baronet is his only son, John Gordon Chaytor (born 1973).

== Notes ==
Baronetage of the United Kingdom
| Preceded by Campbell baronets | Chaytor baronets of Croft and Witton Castle; 30 September 1831 | Succeeded by Clarke baronets |
