= Campbell baronets of Ardnamurchan and Airds (first creation, 1628) =

The Campbell baronetcy, of Ardnamurchan and Airds (estate near Appin) in the County of Argyll, was created in the Baronetage of Nova Scotia on 23 December 1628 for Donald Campbell.

Campbell resigned his dignity into the King's hands on 28 August 1643 for a new enrollment of it and the lands annexed in favour of his nephew and heirs male. The baronetcy was then extinct.

== Campbell baronets, of Ardnamurchan and Airds; first creation (1628) ==
- Sir Donald Campbell, 1st Baronet (died 1651)

== Extended family ==
Upon Donald Campbell's death, his nephew, George (son of Sir John Campbell of Calder), did not claim the title, nor did the next succeeding three heirs, John (3rd), father of Alexander Campbell (4th), married to his cousin Jean Campbell (daughter of Sir John Campbell of Glenorchy, 4th Baronet, and third wife Christian Muschet), parents of Donald Campbell (5th), married to Margaret Maclaine, parents of John Campbell, married to his cousin Jane Campbell.

About 1790 John Campbell, great-great-grandson of George Campbell, assumed the title as 6th Baronet being followed in turn by his son John Campbell, Lieutenant Governor of St Vincent 1845–1853. His son, Major-General John William Campbell's claim in right of the 1628 creation was not recognised. But a new baronetcy was conferred on him in November 1913, with special precedence.
