= Sir Donald Campbell, 1st Baronet, of Ardnamurchan and Airds =

Scottish nobleman

Sir Donald Campbell, 1st Baronet, of Ardnamurchan and Airds (died 1651) was a Scottish nobleman.

He was born illegitimately, the son of Sir John Campbell of Calder.

He held the office of Dean of Lismore and was created 1st Baronet Campbell, of Ardnamurchan, County Argyll (in the Baronetage of Nova Scotia) on 15 January 1628, with special remainder to his half-brother, George Campbell, of Airds Bay, who inherited the estates of Airds Bay in 1651. On 28 August 1643 he obtained a new enfeoffment of Airds and his other estates.

He married, firstly, Lady Jane Campbell, daughter of Colin Campbell, 6th Earl of Argyll and Lady Anne Keith, and secondly her sister Lady Anne Campbell, daughter of Colin Campbell, 6th Earl of Argyll and Lady Anne Keith, and died in 1651 without surviving male isse. On his death, his baronetcy became extinct, although it was claimed in 1804 by a descendant of his half-brother George.

== Sources ==
- George Edward Cokayne, editor, The Complete Baronetage, 5 volumes (no date (c. 1900); reprint, Gloucester, U.K.: Alan Sutton Publishing, 1983), volume II, pages 341 and 2513.
- See Pedigree before p. 1 of The Book of the Thanes of Cawdor: A Series of Papers selected from the Charter Room at Cawdor 1236-1742 By Spalding Club, Aberdeen 1859

Baronetage of Nova Scotia
New creation	Baronet (of Ardnamurchan and Airds); 1628–1651	Dormant
