= Electoral district of Albany (Legislative Council) =

Former electoral district of the Western Australian Legislative Council

Albany Western Australia—Legislative Council
- State: Western Australia
- Dates current: 1870–1890
- Namesake: Albany

Albany was an electoral district of the Legislative Council of Western Australia from 1870 to 1890, during the period when the Legislative Council was the sole chamber of the Parliament of Western Australia.

Albany was one of the original ten Legislative Council districts created by the Legislative Council Act 1870 (33 Vict, No. 13). The district's boundary ran north-east from Point D'Entrecasteaux to the junction of the Balgarup and Arthur Rivers, and then due east from the same junction to the coast. It was bordered by the district of Wellington to the north and the district of Vasse to the north-west. The largest town within the district was its namesake, Albany, and there were few other gazetted settlements during the district's existence.

Four men represented Albany in the Legislative Council between 1870 and 1890, with Sir Thomas Cockburn-Campbell serving the longest (from 1874 to 1889). All but one of Albany's MLCs – John McKail – went on to serve in the Legislative Assembly following the advent of responsible government in 1890.

== Members ==
Member	Party	Term
John McKail	None	1870–1871
Albert Hassell	None	1871–1874
Sir Thomas Cockburn-Campbell	None	1874–1889
Lancel de Hamel	None	1889–1890
