= Sir John Campbell, 1st Baronet =

British Army major-general

Sir John William Campbell, 1st Baronet, CB (1836–1915) was a major-general in the British Army who served in the Crimean War in 1855, in the China campaign in 1860 and in the Second Anglo-Afghan War in 1879–80. He was made a Companion of the Order of the Bath in 1886. He was appointed 1st Lieutenant in the Royal Artillery in 1855; his service in the Crimea in 1854-5 was "in the trenches with the siege train before Sebastopol," for which he was awarded a medal and clasp.

He was the eldest son of John Campbell, Lt Governor of St Vincent 1845–53, by his wife, Hannah Elizabeth Macleod, the daughter of James Macleod, Esq., of Rasay. He succeeded his father to the baronetcy in 1853. He married Catherine Lyona Sophia Cavie in 1867; they had one son, John Bruce Stuart, b. 1877, who succeeded him as baronet in 1915.

His claim to be Baronet of Campbell of Ardnamurchan was not officially recognised by the Standing Council of the Baronetage, but he was listed as the 8th baronet in contemporary peerages (particularly those that pre-date the existence of the SCB), so he apparently used the title socially. He was granted a new baronetcy as Campbell of Ardnamurchan, Argyll on 29 November 1913 with precedency of 1804. The earlier baronetcy was in the Baronetage of Nova Scotia; the second creation was in the Baronetage of the United Kingdom.

After the death of the 2nd Baronet in 1943 (while a prisoner in Palenbang Camp, Sumatra), no one put forward a claim to the baronetcy, and it is listed by the Standing Council of the Baronetage as dormant.

Baronetage of the United Kingdom
New creation	Baronet (of Ardnamurchan); 1913–1915	Succeeded by John Campbell
