= Sir Colin Campbell, 1st Baronet, of Lundie =

Sir Colin Campbell of Lundie, 1st Baronet (died c. 1650) was a Scottish noble. He was the son of Colin Campbell of Lundie, who was youngest son of Colin Campbell, 6th Earl of Argyll. Sir Colin was created a baronet in 1627.

On 26 June 1599 he married Maria Campbell of Glen Orchy, Dowager Countess of Menteith (b. about 1572 Glenorchy, Argyllshire, Scotland, d. 14 December 1618), widow of John Graham, 6th Earl of Menteith (1571–1598).

In addition to her children with Menteith, Dame Maria and Sir Colin had at least one daughter, Mary Campbell of Lundie.

Baronetage of Nova Scotia
| New creation | Baronet (of Lundie); 1627–c. 1650 | Succeeded by Colin Campbell |
