= Campbell baronets of Lundy (1627) =

Escutcheon of the Campbell baronets of Lundy

The Campbell baronetcy, of Lundy (or Lundie) in the County of Forfar, was created in the Baronetage of Nova Scotia on 13 December 1627 for Colin Campbell. He was the son of Colin Campbell of Lundie, younger son of Colin Campbell, 6th Earl of Argyll. The title became dormant on the death of the second Baronet in c. 1696. The title is later believed to have been vested in Archibald Campbell, 1st Duke of Argyll, and his descendants: Cockayne makes this a tentative suggestion.

== Campbell baronets, of Lundy (or Lundie) (1627) ==
- Sir Colin Campbell, 1st Baronet (died c. 1650)
- Sir Colin Campbell, 2nd Baronet (died c. 1696) (dormant)

The Official Roll regards, as of 2026, the Lundy baronetage as dormant.
