= List of mayors of Geraldton =

The City of Greater Geraldton in the Mid West region of Western Australia was originally established as a municipality under the Municipal Institutions Act in 1871, and from 1871 until 1885 the Municipality of Geraldton was headed by a chairman, with all incumbents during this time being men. From 1885 to 1961 the Municipality of Geraldton was headed by a mayor.

With the passage of the Local Government Act 1960 all Western Australia municipalities became towns, effective 1 July 1961, and on 22 April 1988 Geraldton was declared a city. From 1961 until 2007 both the Town of Geraldton and the City of Geraldton were headed by a mayor.

In July 2007, the City of Geraldton merged with the surrounding Shire of Greenough to form the City of Geraldton-Greenough, and in July 2011 the City of Geraldton-Greenough merged with the Shire of Mullewa to form the City of Greater Geraldton. From 2007 to the present day (2026) both the City of Geraldton-Greenough and the City of Greater Geraldton have been headed by a mayor.

The various incumbents chairmen and mayors are listed below.

== Municipality of Geraldton ==
Chairman / Mayor	Term
Capt. Daniel Scott (1st Chairman)	1871–1874
Charles Crowther	1875–1876
Arthur Houssemayne du Boulay	1877–1878
George Baston Sen.	1879–1880
Charles Crowther	1881
George Baston Sen.	1882
Edward Shenton	1883
William Hepburn Gale	1884
George Baston Sen. (1st Mayor)	1885–1886
William Jose	1887–1888
Edward Shenton	1889–1891
Henry Spalding	1892
William Jose	1893
Charles Watson Gray	1894
Charles Reilly	1895
Harry Ainsworth	1896
Henry Spalding	1897
Robert Hutchinson	1898–1900
Edward Pope	1901
William Jose	1902–1904
Frank E. Davis	1905
Francis Gow Armstrong	1905–1907
John Greenwood Smith	1908
William Jose	1909
John Urch	1910–1911
Benjamin M. Fuller	1912
Launcelot Machell Hungerford	1913
George Adam Kempton	1913–1915
William Bower Fallowfield	1915–1917
Frank Green	1917–1919
George Adam Kempton	1919–1921
George Ernest Sewell	1921–1922
George Adam Kempton	1922–1923
Frank Green	1923–1925
George Ernest Sewell	1925–1929
George Alexander Houston	1929–1930
John McCabe	1930–1931
George Lester	1931–1936
Richard Carson	1936–1945
Dr James McAleer	1945–1957
Charles Stewart Eadon-Clarke	1957–1961

== Town of Geraldton ==
Mayor	Term
Charles Eadon-Clarke	1961–1968
Vic Askew	1968–1972
Harry Assad	1972–1977
Lyle James Harris	1977–1982
Phil Cooper	1982–1988

== City of Geraldton ==
Mayor	Term
Faye Simpson	1988–1991
Edward Whelan	1991–1994
Phil Cooper	1994–2001
Vickie Petersen	2001–2007

== City of Geraldton-Greenough ==
Mayor	Term
Ian Carpenter	2007–2011

== City of Greater Geraldton ==
Mayor	Term
Ian Carpenter	2011–2015
Shane Van Styn	2015-2023
Jerry Clune	2023-present
