= Attorney General Campbell =

Attorney General Campbell may refer to:

- Bonnie Campbell (politician) (born 1948), Attorney General of Iowa
- James Campbell (postmaster general) (1812–1893), Attorney-General of Pennsylvania
- James Campbell, 1st Baron Glenavy (1851–1931), Attorney-General for Ireland
- John Campbell, 1st Baron Campbell (1779–1861), Attorney General for England and Wales
- Kim Campbell (born 1947), Attorney General of Canada

== See also ==
- General Campbell (disambiguation)
