= Shenton House, Western Australia =

Shenton House
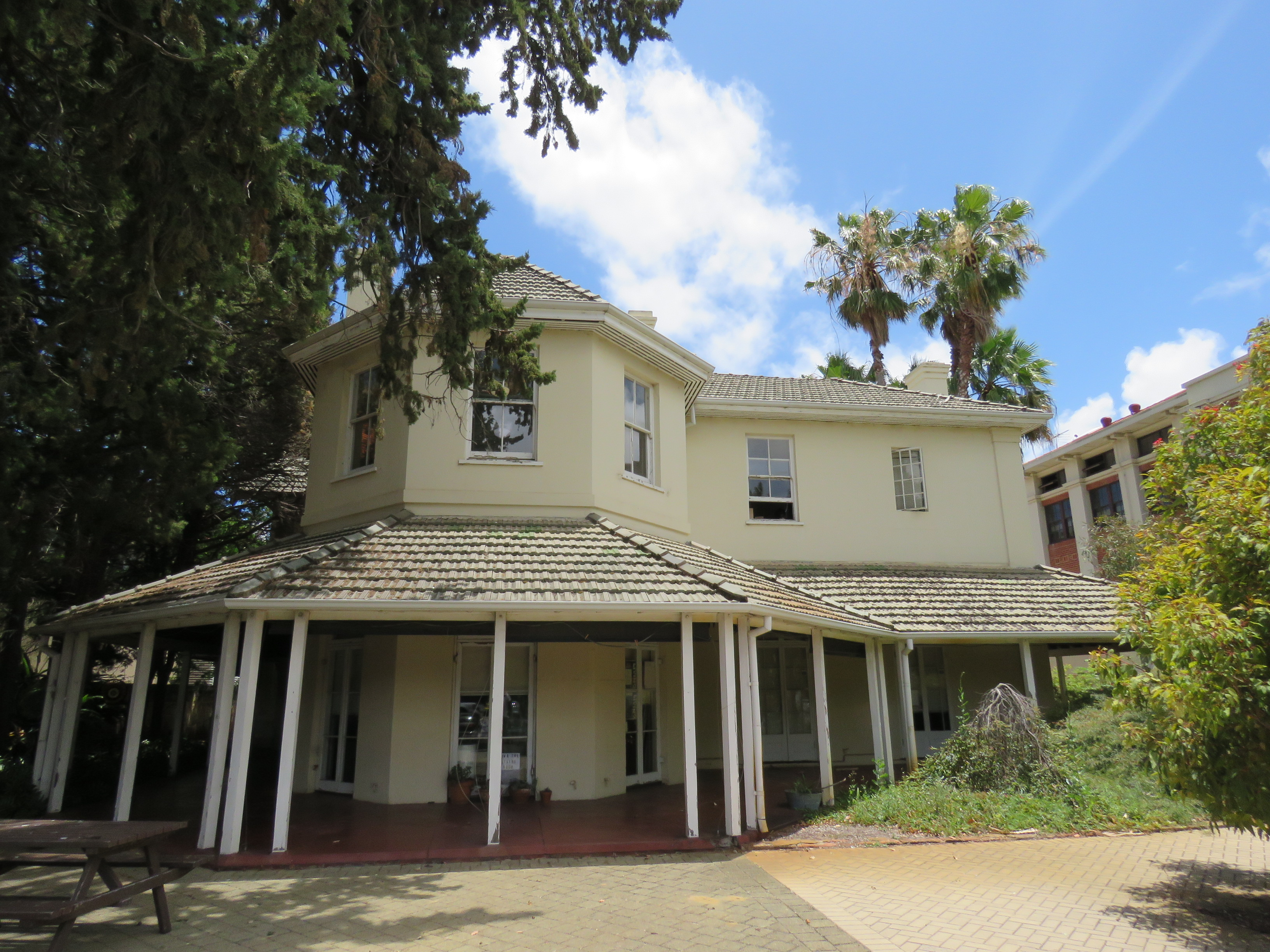
- Shenton House in December 2021

General information
- Type: Historic building
- Location: Perth, Western Australia
- Coordinates: 31.981249°S 115.819816°E

Western Australia Heritage Register
- Type: State Registered Place
- Designated: 30 October 1998
- Reference no.: 2457

Shenton House is a historic building within the grounds of The University of Western Australia in Perth. It is a two-story Georgian style building with surrounding verandas.

Originally called 'Crawley Park House', it is the oldest building on campus, built in 1846 by Henry Charles Sutherland. Sutherland was a surveyor who became Clerk to the Colonial Treasurer, then Secretary to the Executive and Legislative Councils, and later Collector of Inland Revenue and Colonial Treasurer.

It was given to the university in 1914 to accommodate the Department of Mining and Engineering, which occupied it until 1960. Various alterations were made during this period to accommodate teaching requirements. In 1921, the university formally acquired the roughly 81-hectare (200-acre) property, including the house, from the family of Sir George Shenton. It was then renamed in his honour.

Since 1988, the building has belonged to the School of Indigenous Studies.

The building is a heritage listed building of both the National Trust of Australia (1997) and the Australian Heritage Council (1998).
