= Campbell baronets of Airds (1939) =

The Campbell baronetcy, of Airds in the County of Argyll, was created in the Baronetage of the United Kingdom on 3 July 1939 for the Conservative politician Edward Campbell. The title became extinct on the death of the second Baronet in 1954.

== Campbell baronets, of Airds (1939) ==
- Sir Edward Taswell Campbell, 1st Baronet (1879–1945)
- Sir Charles Duncan Macnair Campbell, 2nd Baronet (1906–1954)
