= Campbell baronets of Ardkinglass (1679) =

Escutcheon of the Campbell baronets of Ardkinglass

The Campbell baronetcy, of Ardkinglass in the County of Argyll, was created in the Baronetage of Nova Scotia on 23 March 1679 for Colin Campbell. His son, the second Baronet, represented several constituencies in the British House of Commons. The title became extinct on the latter's death in 1752.

== Campbell baronets, of Ardkinglass (1679) ==
- Sir Colin Campbell, 1st Baronet, of Ardkinglass (c. 1640–1709)
- Sir James Campbell, 2nd Baronet (c. 1666–1752)
