= Livingston baronets of Glentirran (1685) =

The Livingston (later Campbell) baronetcy, of Glentirran in the County of Stirling, was created in the Baronetage of Nova Scotia on 20 July 1685 for Alexander Livingston.

The third Baronet assumed the surname of Campbell in lieu of Livingston. He sat as Member of Parliament for Stirlingshire. The title became either extinct or dormant on the death of the fourth Baronet in 1810; it does not appear on the Official Roll as of 2026.

== Livingston (later Campbell) baronets, of Glentirran (1685) ==
- Sir Alexander Livingston, 1st Baronet (died 1698)
- Sir James Livingston, 2nd Baronet (died 1771)
- Sir James Campbell, 3rd Baronet (c. 1719–1788)
- Sir Alexander Campbell, 4th Baronet (died 1810)
