= Thomas Cockburn-Campbell =

Australian politician

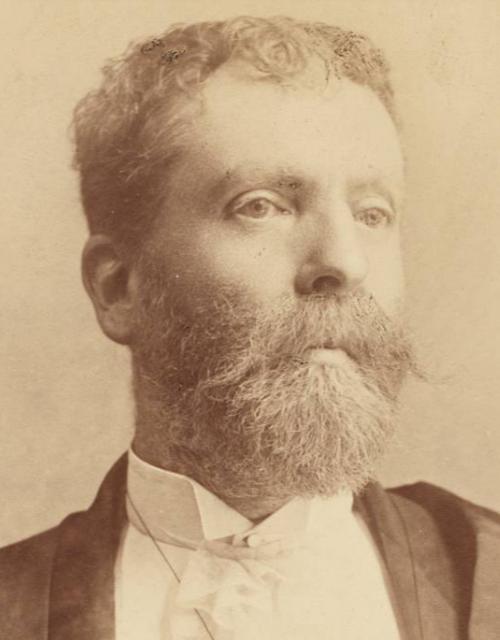
- Sir Thomas Cockburn-Campbell, c. 1891

1st President of the Western Australian Legislative Council
- In office 29 December 1890 – 27 September 1892
- Preceded by: Position created
- Succeeded by: George Shenton

Member of the Western Australian Legislative Council for Albany
- In office 23 September 1874 – 4 February 1889
- Preceded by: Albert Hassell
- Succeeded by: Lancel de Hamel

Personal details
- Born: 18 April 1845 Exeter, England, UK
- Died: 27 September 1892 (aged 47) Parliament House, West Perth, Western Australia
- Cause of death: Chlorodyne overdose
- Resting place: East Perth Cemeteries
- Spouse: Lucy Anne Trimmer (m. 1870)
- Children: 4
- Relatives: Merome Beard (great-great-granddaughter)
- Profession: Tabloid editor, politician

Sir Thomas Cockburn-Campbell, 4th Baronet (18 April 1845 – 27 September 1892) was an English-born Australian journalist and politician. He was a member of the Western Australian Legislative Council and the first president of the Legislative Council after the colony achieved responsible government.

== Early life ==
Cockburn-Campbell was born in Exeter in 1845. He was the second son of Sir Alexander Thomas Cockburn-Campbell, the second baronet of Gartsford, and his wife Lucy Anne (nee Trimmer)

== Career ==
Cockburn-Campbell left England for Queensland, Australia in 1864 where he worked with Augustus Gregory as a chain man and later with other surveyors. In the late 1860s, he went to Western Australia and took up farming.

In 1871, after his brother died, Cockburn-Campbell succeeded him as the fourth baronet.

In 1871, he was appointed a member of the colony's Legislative Council.

In 1890, he went to London as a delegate to ensure the passage of the Western Australian Constitution Bill conferring Western Australia with responsible government. After the passage of the bill, the Legislative Council became the upper house of Parliament and Cockburn-Campbell became the new council's first president.

Cockburn-Campbell also served as editor of The West Australian newspaper from 1879-1887.

== Personal life and death ==
Cockburn-Campbell married Lucy Anne Trimmer in 1870. He died in Perth on 28 September 1892 and was survived by two sons and four daughters. His eldest son, Alexander, became the fifth baronet.

Cockburn-Campbell's great-great-granddaughter is the Western Australian MP, Merome Beard.

== Music ==
Cockburn-Campbell composed a waltz "The Fair Maid of Perth" (1890) dedicated to Miss Margaret Brockman (Mrs P. A. Hope), published in London.

== Bibliography ==
- Serle, Percival (1949). "Campbell, Thomas Cockburn". Dictionary of Australian Biography. Sydney: Angus & Robertson.
- O. K. Battye, 'Cockburn-Campbell, Sir Thomas (1845 - 1892)', Australian Dictionary of Biography, Volume 3, MUP, 1969, pp 434–435

Baronetage of the United Kingdom
Preceded by Alexander Cockburn-Campbell	Baronet (of Gartsford); 1871–1892	Succeeded by Alexander Thomas Cockburn-Campbell

Western Australian Legislative Council
Preceded by Albert Hassell	Member for Albany; 1874-1889	Succeeded by Lancel de Hamel
Preceded by New position	President of the Western Australian Legislative Council; 1890–1892	Succeeded by George Shenton
