= Cockburn-Campbell baronets =

Baronetcy in the Baronetage of the United Kingdom

The Campbell, later Cockburn-Campbell Baronetcy, of Gartsford in the County of Ross, is a title in the Baronetage of the United Kingdom. It was created on 3 July 1821 for Lieutenant-General Alexander Campbell, with remainder, in default of male issue of his own, to 1) the male issue of his daughter Olympia, failing which 2) to the male issue of his daughter Isabella Charlotte. He had already been created a baronet on 6 May 1815, with normal remainder to heirs male. Campbell had earlier fought at the Battle of Seringapatam in 1799 and commanded a division during the Peninsular War. The creation of 1815 became extinct on his death in 1824 while he was succeeded in the 1821 creation by Alexander Thomas Cockburn, who assumed the additional surname of Campbell the same year. The fourth Baronet was President of the Legislative Council of Western Australia. The sixth Baronet was the author of the autobiography "Land of Lots of Time".

The family surname is pronounced "Coburn-Campbell".

== Campbell baronets, of Gartsford (1815) ==
- Sir Alexander Campbell, 1st Baronet (died 1824)

== Campbell, later Cockburn-Campbell baronets, of Gartsford (1821) ==
- Sir Alexander Campbell, 1st Baronet (died 1824)
- Sir Alexander Thomas Cockburn-Campbell, 2nd Baronet (died 1871)
- Sir Alexander Cockburn-Campbell, 3rd Baronet (1843–1871)
- Sir Thomas Cockburn-Campbell, 4th Baronet (1845–1892)
- Sir Alexander Thomas Cockburn-Campbell, 5th Baronet (1872–1935)
- Sir Thomas Cockburn-Campbell, 6th Baronet (1918–1999)
- Sir Alexander Thomas Cockburn-Campbell, 7th Baronet (born 1945)

The Heir Apparent is the present baronet's son, Thomas Justin Cockburn-Campbell (born 1974)
