= Sir Alexander Campbell, 1st Baronet =

British general (1760–1824)

Lieutenant-General Sir Alexander Campbell GCB Bt
- Born: 20 August 1760; Baleed, Perthshire, Kingdom of Great Britain
- Died: 11 December 1824 (aged 64); Madras, India
- Military career
- Allegiance: Kingdom of Great Britain (to 1800); United Kingdom (from 1801)
- Branch: British Army
- Service years: 1776–1824
- Rank: Lieutenant-General
- Commands: Madras Army
- Conflicts: American Revolutionary War: Battle of Dogger Bank; Great Siege of Gibraltar; Fourth Anglo-Mysore War: Battle of Seringapatam; Napoleonic Wars: Battle of Vizagapatam; Battle of Talavera; Battle of Fuentes de Oñoro
- Awards: Baronetcy; Knight Grand Cross of the Order of the Bath

Lieutenant-General Sir Alexander Campbell, 1st Baronet, GCB (20 August 1760 – 11 December 1824) was a senior officer of the British Army during the early nineteenth century. His long and varied career saw extensive action, including engagements in Europe during the American Revolutionary War, in India during the Fourth Anglo-Mysore War and subsequently in the Peninsular War as one of the Duke of Wellington's generals. Badly wounded during the Peninsular campaign, Campbell was rewarded with a knighthood and a baronetcy, later holding a number of prestigious military commands.

== Life ==
Alexander Campbell was born in 1760, the son of John Campbell of Achalader, Perthshire (of a branch of the Breadalbane Campbells) and Isabella, daughter of John Campbell of Barcaldine. In 1776 at the outbreak of the American Revolutionary War, 16-year-old Campbell purchased a commission in the Royal Regiment and by 1780 had become a captain, moving to the 97th Regiment of Foot. In 1781 the 97th was ordered aboard ships of the Channel Fleet for service as temporary Royal Marines and Campbell served at the Great Siege of Gibraltar and the Battle of Dogger Bank against the Dutch in the same year. He returned to Gibraltar the following year and remained there until the end of the siege in 1783, when the regiment was disbanded at Hillsea and Campbell was placed on half pay. In 1787, Campbell secured a commission in a new regiment being raised for service in India, named the 74th Regiment of Foot, sailing in 1793.

In India Campbell rose rapidly through the ranks and by 1795 was a lieutenant colonel, serving in the Fourth Anglo-Mysore War in 1799 under General Sir Arthur Wellesley and participating in the Battle of Seringapatam that concluded the campaign. In the aftermath of the victory, Campbell was detached from his regiment and served in a number of military administration posts in Southern India, including governor of Seringapatam in 1805. In 1804 his eldest son, John Morshead Campbell, had been killed at the Battle of Assaye and some months later Campbell had been stationed at the port city of Vizagapatam when it was attacked by a French squadron under Charles-Alexandre Durand Linois: Campbell directed the harbour's defences in the Battle of Vizagapatam, in which the French were driven off despite the loss of two East Indiaman merchant ships. In 1807, Campbell returned to Europe.

Campbell was appointed brigadier general and was stationed in Ireland, before joining Wellesley's army in Portugal during the Peninsular War in January 1809. Several months later he was wounded in the thigh at the Battle of Talavera, returning to Britain to recuperate. By January 1810 he was back with the army in Portugal as a major-general, commanding the British 6th Division at the Battle of Fuentes de Oñoro. Shortly afterwards however his health deteriorated and he returned to Britain. His second son, Allan William Campbell was killed in action in the Peninsular War, at the Battle of Sorauren in 1813. In 1812 Campbell acted as Wellington's stand in at his investiture, Knight Commander of the Order of the Bath. Campbell would be inducted into the order later in the year. He was also made governor of the military forces on Mauritius and Île Bourbon remaining there as a lieutenant-general until they were returned to the French in 1816. In 1815, Campbell was transferred at the reformation of the Order of the Bath as Knight Grand Cross of the Order of the Bath and was also given a baronetcy. In 1820 he was made Commander-in-Chief of the Madras Army. He died on 11 December 1824 at Madras and was interred there, the baronetcy passing to his grandson Alexander Thomas Cockburn.

He was granted an augmentation of honour to his coat of arms: above his inherited arms (Campbell quartering Lorn and Stewart) was added "a chief argent charged with a rock proper subscribed Gibraltar, between two medals for Seringapatam and Talavera" commemorating his part in the Great Siege of Gibraltar.

== Family ==
In 1783 Campbell married Olympia Elizabeth (died 1794), eldest daughter of William Morshead of Cartuther, Cornwall. They had three daughters (Olympia, Isabella, and Amelia), and two sons. The elder son, Lieutenant John Morshead Campbell was killed at the Battle of Assaye in 1803 during the Second Anglo-Maratha War, (Note: Stuart Reid in the ODNB states "Lieutenant John Morshead Campbell, was killed in action at Assaye in 1804" but the year is probably wrong as the Battle of Assaye was fought in 1803 and Charles Mosley states that the death occurred in 1803 and the younger Major Allan William Campbell died of his wounds at Pamplona on 9 October 1813 having been wounded at the battle of Sorauren whilst attached to the Portuguese army during the Peninsular War.)

On 3 November 1808, Campbell married Elizabeth Anne (died 1870), daughter of the Revd Thomas Pemberton. The couple had a son who died in infancy and a daughter called Flora Elizabeth (born 1824).

On 3 July 1821—after the death of his three sons—Campbell obtained a renewed patent to the baronetcy, extending the limitation to his grandson Alexander Thomas Cockburn (the son of Campbell's eldest daughter Olympia), and if Alexander Thomas were to die without a male heir, to the male issue of his second daughter Isabella Charlotte, Lady Malcolm. Alexander Thomas Cockburn took an additional surname in 1825 becoming Cockburn-Campbell. His descendant, Sir Alexander Thomas Cockburn-Campbell, 7th Baronet, lives in Australia, as did his father and grandfather.

== Notes ==
Military offices
Preceded by Sir Thomas Hislop	C-in-C, Madras Army; 1820–1825	Succeeded by Sir George Walker
Preceded by Edward Paget	Colonel of the 80th Regiment of Foot (Staffordshire Volunteers); 1815–1825	Succeeded by Sir Rufane Shaw Donkin
Preceded by Edwin Hewgill	Colonel of the York Light Infantry Volunteers; 1809–1815	Succeeded by Sir John Byng
Baronetage of the United Kingdom
New creation	Baronet (of Gartsford); 1815–1824	Extinct
New creation	Baronet (of Gartsford); 1821–1824	Succeeded by Alexander Cockburn-Campbell
