= Campbell baronets of Barcaldine and Glenure (1831) =

Escutcheon of the Campbell baronets of Barcaldine

The Campbell baronetcy, of Barcaldine (or Barcaldyne) in the County of Argyll and of Glenure, was created in the Baronetage of the United Kingdom on 30 September 1831 for the soldier Duncan Campbell.

== Campbell baronets, of Barcaldine (or Barcaldyne) and of Glenure (1831) ==
- Sir Duncan Campbell, 1st Baronet (1786–1842)
- Sir Alexander Campbell, 2nd Baronet (1819–1880)
- Sir Duncan Alexander Dundas Campbell, 3rd Baronet (1856–1926)
- Sir Alexander William Dennistoun Campbell, 4th Baronet (1848–1931)
- Sir Duncan John Alfred Campbell, 5th Baronet (1854–1932)
- Sir Eric Francis Dennistoun Campbell, 6th Baronet (1892–1963)
- Sir Ian Vincent Hamilton Campbell, 7th Baronet (1895–1978)
- Sir Niall Alexander Hamilton Campbell, 8th Baronet (1925–2003)
- Sir Roderick Duncan Cameron Campbell 9th Baronet (born 1961)

The heir presumptive to the baronetcy is Angus Charles Dundas Campbell (born 1967), 2nd and youngest son of the 8th Baronet and brother of the 9th Baronet.

== Extended family ==
The third son of the 1st Baronet, John Peter William Campbell (1824–1901), was a Major-General in the Bengal Staff Corps.

== Notes ==
Baronetage of the United Kingdom
Preceded by Brinckman baronets	Campbell baronets of Barcaldine and Glenure; 30 September 1831	Succeeded by Campbell baronets
