= Campbell baronets of Carrick Buoy (1831) =

Title in the Baronetage of the United Kingdom

The Campbell baronetcy, of Carrick Buoy (Carrickboy) in the County of Donegal, was created in the Baronetage of the United Kingdom on 30 September 1831 for Robert Campbell. The title became extinct on the death of the fourth Baronet in 1900.

== Campbell baronets, of Carrick Buoy (1831) ==
- Sir Robert Campbell, 1st Baronet (1771–1858)
- Sir John Nicholl Robert Campbell, 2nd Baronet (1799–1870)
- Sir Gilbert Edward Campbell, 3rd Baronet (1838–1896)
- Sir Claude Robert Campbell, 4th Baronet (1871–1900). He was lost in the 1900 wreck of the Sutherlandshire merchantman, on which he was a member of the crew, off Sumatra, not being listed among the survivors. In the High Court of Justice on 24 October 1910 Mr Justice Bargrave Deane gave leave to presume him dead.

== Notes ==
Baronetage of the United Kingdom
Preceded by Campbell baronets	Campbell baronets of Carrick Buoy; 30 September 1831	Succeeded by Campbell baronets
