= Campbell baronets of New Brunswick (1831) =

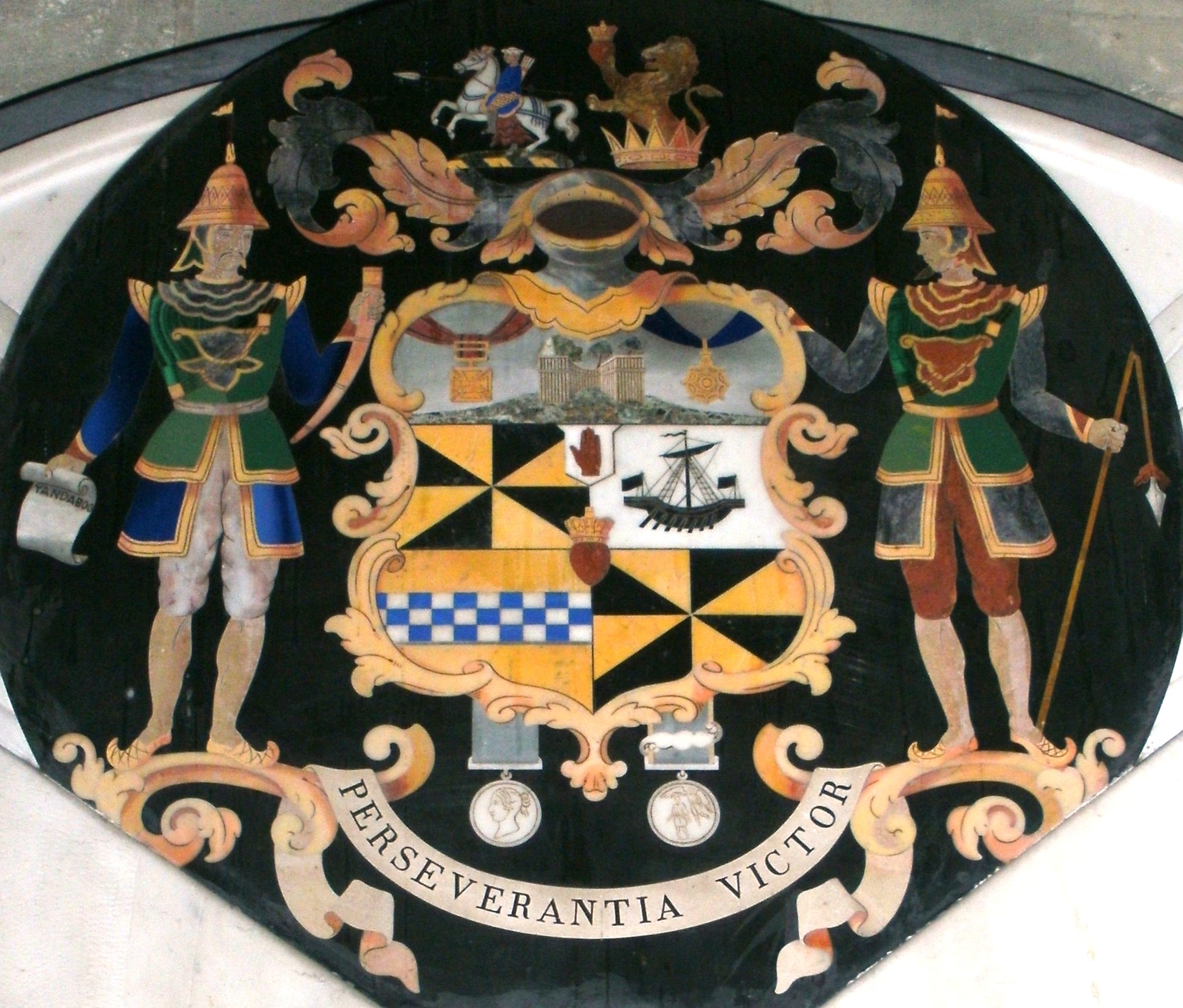
Heraldic achievement of the Campbell Baronets of New Brunswick, as displayed on the memorial of Major General Sir John Campbell, 2nd Baronet (1807–1855) in Winchester Cathedral.

The Campbell baronetcy, of New Brunswick, was created in the Baronetage of the United Kingdom on 30 September 1831 for Archibald Campbell, Lieutenant Governor of New Brunswick. The title became extinct on the death of the fifth Baronet in 1949.

== Campbell baronets, of New Brunswick (1831) ==
- Sir Archibald Campbell, 1st Baronet (1769–1843)
- Sir John Campbell, 2nd Baronet (1807–1855)
- Sir Archibald Ava Campbell, 3rd Baronet (1844–1913)
- Sir Archibald Augustus Ava Campbell, 4th Baronet (1879–1916). Killed in action during World War I as a lieutenant in the 8th Cameron Highlanders at Hohenzollern Redoubt, 10 May 1916.
- Sir William Andrewes Ava Campbell, 5th Baronet (1880–1949)

== Notes ==
Baronetage of the United Kingdom
Preceded by Campbell baronets	Campbell baronets of New Brunswick; 30 September 1831	Succeeded by Chaytor baronets
