= John Campbell (Indian Army officer, born 1802) =

Scottish army officer (1802-1878)

General Sir John Campbell KCSI CB (1802 – 1878) was a Scottish army officer who served in the East India Company and the Indian Army.

== Life ==
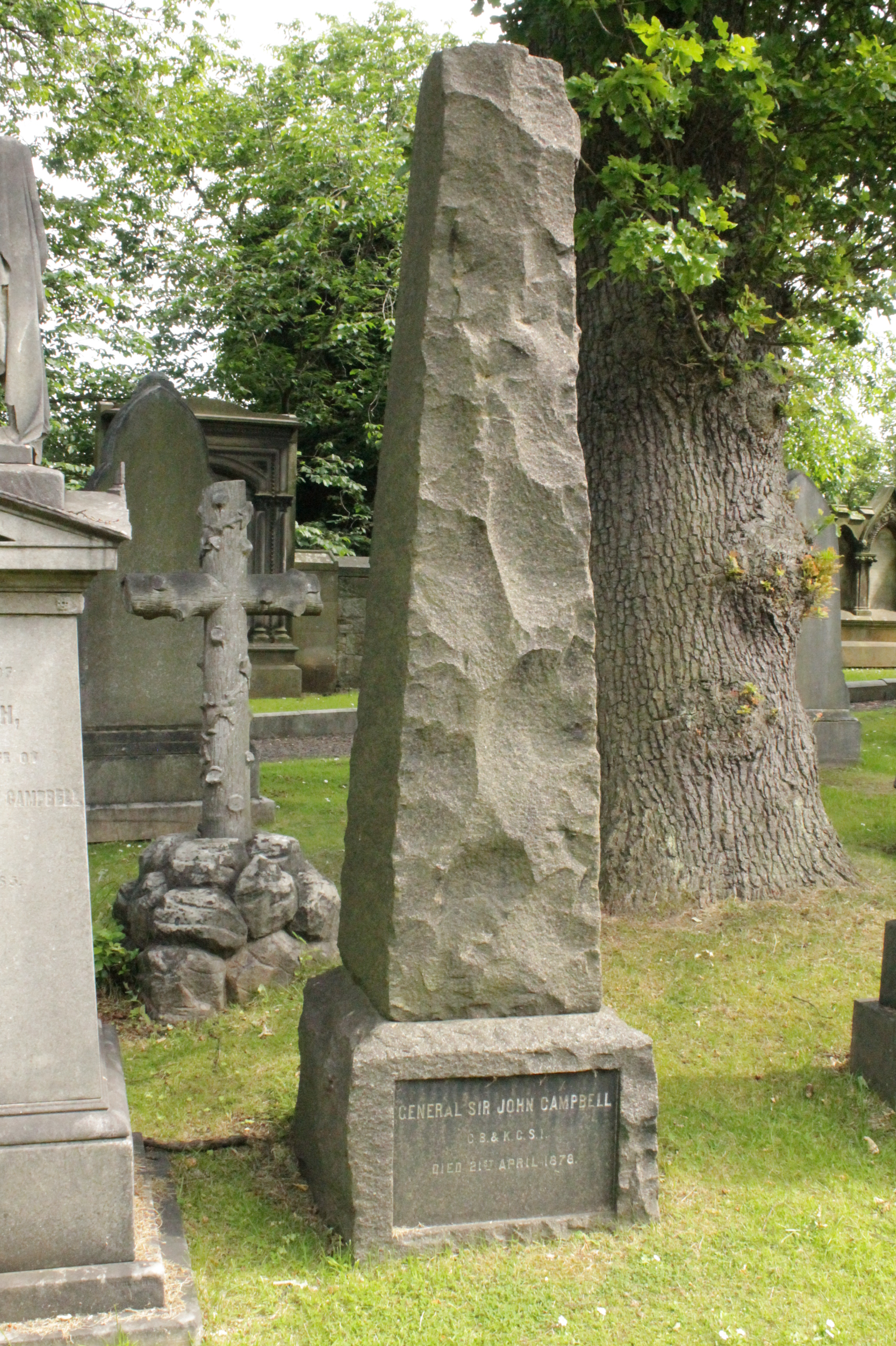
The grave of General Sir John Campbell, Dean Cemetery

He was born in Kingsburgh on the Isle of Skye the son of John Campbell of Lochend and his wife, Annabella Campbell of Melfort. He joined the British Army as an ensign in 1819 but instead decided to join the East India Company in 1820, where prospects appeared better.

In April 1820 he was appointed a lieutenant in the 41st Madras Native Infantry. He worked in the Madras area until 1830, when he was promoted to captain. In 1834 he was asked to quell a rebellion in the Kimedy hills in the Orissa region. On the death of Major Barclay he commanded the entire force, and was successful in this action. His knowledge of the area meant that he was chosen to lead the troops in the Goomsoor War of 1836/37. At the end of this period he was asked to be governor of the Khonds, the hill tribes of the Orissa, with a special task of trying to end female infanticide in the area.

In 1842 he joined his old regiment, the 41st, on a posting to China, and was soon after both promoted to lieutenant colonel and awarded a Commander of the Order of the Bath (CB) in December. However, he was asked to return to Madras and from 1847 resumed control of the Khonds, as his successor was proving ineffective.

In 1849 he went to the Cape of Good Hope to improve his health. He returned to India in 1851. In 1853 he was promoted to colonel. He returned to Scotland in 1855 and took up residence in Edinburgh. Although semi-retired he was promoted to major general in 1859.

In 1866 Queen Victoria made him a Knight Commander of the Star of India (KCSI). He was promoted to lieutenant general in 1867 and full general in 1872.

He died on 21 April 1878 and is buried in Dean Cemetery. The grave lies in the inner east section of one of the smaller sections in the centre of the main south path.

== Publications ==
- A personal narrative of thirteen years service amongst the wild tribes of Khondistan for the suppression of human sacrifice (1864)

== Family ==
His wife Elizabeth died in 1883 and was buried next to him.
