= Campbell baronets of Ardnamurchan (second creation, 1913) =

The Campbell baronetcy, of Ardnamurchan in the County of Argyll, was created in the Baronetage of the United Kingdom on 29 November 1913, with precedency of 1804, for soldier John Campbell, heir of a branch of Campbell family who claimed the Campbell baronetcy of Ardnamurchan and Airds (created in 1628). The second Baronet died in 1943 while a prisoner in Palenbang Camp, Sumatra. The third disappeared shortly before his father's death, leaving a note in London for his mother. Debrett's Peerage & Baronetage in 2000 notes there has been no information on him since that time. The title is not included in the Official Roll.

== Campbell baronets, of Ardnamurchan; second creation (1913) ==
- Sir John William Campbell, 1st Baronet (1836–1915)
- Sir John Bruce Stuart Campbell, 2nd Baronet (1877–1943)
- Sir Bruce Colin Patrick Campbell, 3rd Baronet (born 1904).
