= Anthony Curtis (whaler) =

Australian whaler and businessperson (1796–1853)

Anthony Curtis (1796 – 11 January 1853) was an Australian whaler and businessperson. Owner of many ships, Curtis sent the Fanny, which weighed between 25 and 36 tonnes, to Java, Indonesia, in December 1834, and also purchased the Lady Sterling in the same year.

== Biography ==
Born in London, he ran away from home and became a ship's boy in the Royal Navy. While in service he was present at the taking of San Sebastian in 1813. He left the navy and came to Western Australia aboard the Medina in 1830.

At Fremantle he became a hotel-keeper and ran a store. In 1834 he purchased the schooner Fanny (36 tons) which then traded between Albany and Fremantle. He established a fishing station at the Abrolhos Islands in 1834 where the fish were dried and exported to Mauritius. He had the lease of the Bathers Bay whaling station at Fremantle in the 1840s in partnership with D. Scott. By 1845 he is supposed to have had a whaling station off Rottnest Island. He traded to Mauritius, Ceylon and the Dutch East Indies (Indonesia).

He married Suzannah Glindon at Fremantle in 1836 and they had four children. He died at Fremantle on 11 January 1853.

== Works cited ==
- Henderson, Graeme (1980). Unfinished voyages: Western Australian shipwrecks, 1622-1850. University of Western Australia Press.
- Cara Cammileri, "Curtis, Anthony (1796–1853) Australian Dictionary of Biography, Vol 1, A-H, 1788–1850, Vol 1,
