= Charles C. Campbell (general) =

United States Army general

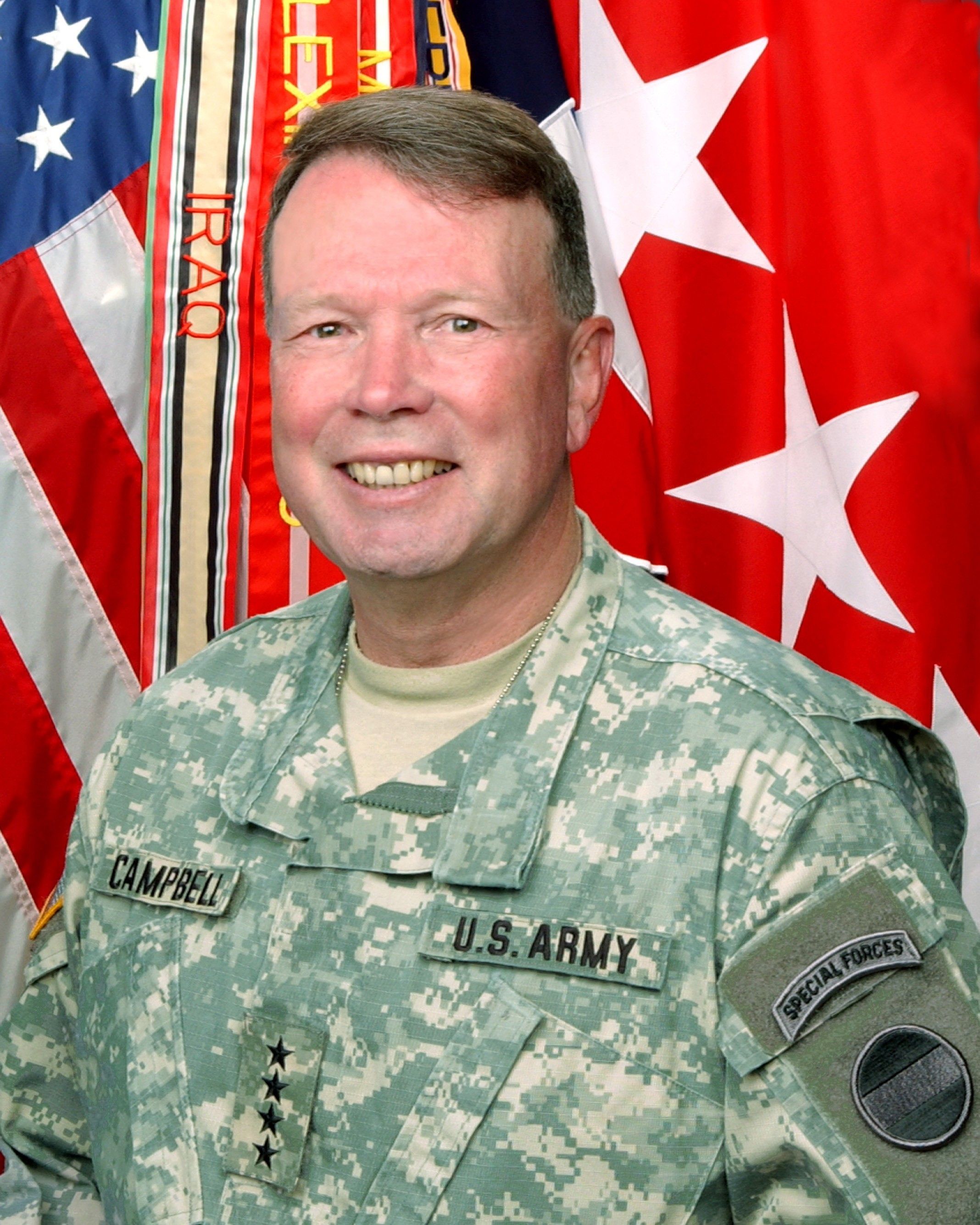
- General Campbell
- Born: 24 August 1948; Shreveport, Louisiana, U.S.
- Died: 8 February 2016 (aged 67); Shreveport, Louisiana, U.S.
- Burial place: Arlington National Cemetery
- Spouse: Betty Dianne Campbell
- Military career
- Allegiance: United States
- Branch: United States Army
- Service years: 1970–2010
- Rank: General
- Nickname: Hondo
- Commands: United States Army Forces Command; Eighth United States Army; 7th Infantry Division
- Conflicts: Vietnam War
- Awards: Army Distinguished Service Medal; Defense Superior Service Medal; Legion of Merit (4); Bronze Star Medal

Charles Christopher "Hondo" Campbell (24 August 1948 – 8 February 2016) was a United States Army officer who served as the 17th Commanding General, United States Army Forces Command (FORSCOM). He previously served as FORSCOM's Deputy Commanding General and Chief of Staff from April 2006 to January 2007. He assumed the commanding general assignment 9 January 2007, and completed it on 3 June 2010.

== Early life and education ==
Campbell was born in Shreveport, Louisiana, where his brother, James H. Campbell, III, is an attorney. He attended St Stephen's Episcopal School in Austin, Texas, then he earned his commission through Reserve Officers' Training Corps at Louisiana State University in Baton Rouge, from which he received a Bachelor of Arts degree in History. His initial assignment was as an instructor at the Infantry Training Command (provisional), United States Army Training Center Infantry in Fort Ord, California.

== Military career ==
After Special Forces training, Campbell went on to teach tactics at Forces Armeé National Khmere Training Command, Army Advisory Group, Phouc Tuy Training Battalion, United States Army, Vietnam. He subsequently served as an A-Detachment Executive Officer and Commander in Vietnam. His succeeding commands include a Combat Support Company in the 2d Armored Division, Fort Hood, Texas; an armor battalion in the 3d Armored Division – 2/67AR, United States Army Europe and a heavy brigade in the 2nd Infantry Division, Eighth Army, South Korea. He was also the Commanding General of the 7th Infantry Division at Fort Carson, Colorado and the Commanding General, Eighth United States Army, South Korea.

Campbell's staff assignments included service as Operations Officer, 3–63 Armor, Augsburg, Germany; Chief, Exercise Branch, 3d Infantry Division, Wuerzburg, Germany; Plans and Operations Officer, Combined Field Army, Republic of Korea; Senior Task Force Observer/Controller and later Deputy Commander, Operations Group, Combat Maneuver Training Center, Hohenfels, Germany; Chief of Staff, 2d Infantry Division (Mechanized), Eighth Army, South Korea; Assistant Division Commander, 1st Cavalry Division, Fort Hood, Texas; Chief of Staff, I Corps and Fort Lewis, Fort Lewis, Washington; Deputy Commanding General, Third Army, Fort McPherson, Georgia; Chief of Staff, United States Army Europe and Seventh Army, Germany; Chief of Staff, United States Central Command; and Chief of Staff, United Nations Command, Combined Forces Command, and United States Forces Korea.

Campbell received a Master of Military Art and Science from the United States Army Command and General Staff College. He attended a wide variety of military schools, including the School of Advanced Military Studies in 1986, as well as the Army War College in 1991. He retired from the army on 3 June 2010. At the time of his retirement, he was the last active general officer who had served in the Vietnam War.

Campbell died on 8 February 2016, at the age of sixty-seven in Shreveport, where he returned after retiring from the military to live with his wife, Betty Dianne Campbell.

== Military awards and decorations ==
His military awards and decorations include:

1st Row	Army Distinguished Service Medal	Defense Superior Service Medal	Legion of Merit with 3 Oak Leaf Clusters
2nd Row	Bronze Star Medal	Meritorious Service Medal with 5 Oak Leaf Clusters	Army Commendation Medal with Oak Leaf Cluster
3rd Row	Army Achievement Medal	National Defense Service Medal with two service stars	Armed Forces Expeditionary Medal
4th Row	Vietnam Service Medal with two campaign stars	Global War on Terrorism Service Medal	Korea Defense Service Medal
5th Row	Army Service Ribbon	Army Overseas Service Ribbon	Vietnam Campaign Medal
Badge	Basic Parachutist Badge		
Tab	Special Forces Tab		
Unit awards	Army Presidential Unit Citation with oak leaf cluster		Joint Meritorious Unit Award
Unit awards	Philippine Republic Presidential Unit Citation	Republic of Korea Presidential Unit Citation	Vietnam Unit Gallantry Cross With Palm
