= Dumfries Burghs (Commonwealth Parliament constituency) =

- Former constituency for the Protectorate Parliament
- Region: Scotland

Former constituency
- Created: 1654
- Abolished: 1659
- Created from: Scotland
- Replaced by: Dumfries; Sanquhar; Lochmaben; Annan; Wigtown; Kirkcudbright; Whithorn; New Galloway

During the Commonwealth of England, Scotland and Ireland, called the Protectorate, the Scottish burghs of Dumfries, Sanquhar, Lochmaben, Annan, Wigtown, Kirkcudbright, Whithorn and New Galloway were jointly represented by one Member of Parliament in the House of Commons at Westminster from 1654 until 1659. Elections were held at Dumfries.
