= Jeremiah Tolhurst =

English tailor, soldier, businessman and politician

Jeremiah Tolhurst (1615 – 1671) was an English tailor, soldier, businessman and politician who sat in the House of Commons at various times between 1654 and 1660. He fought in the Parliamentary army in the English Civil War.

Tolhurst was the son of Jeremy Tolhurst, yeoman, of Icklesham, Sussex and his second wife Elizabeth Wymond, daughter of Paul Wymond, attorney, of Winchelsea, Sussex. His father died in 1623 and he became a tailor. He served in the Parliamentary army during the Civil War at first in a Kentish regiment and then in the New Model Army. He was a lieutenant of foot until 1644 when he became a captain. In 1649 he became a major. He moved to the north and acquired interests in coal and salt. He helped to supply Cromwell's army during the Scottish campaign.

Tolhurst was a freeman of Dumfries by 1654 when he represented Dumfries Burghs in the First Protectorate Parliament. He became a freeman of Newcastle and a member of Hostmen's Company in 1655. He was deputy governor of Carlisle from 1655 to March 1660 and was also commissioner for sequestrations for Cumberland and Westmorland in 1655 and commissioner for security from 1655 to 1656. He was J.P. for Cumberland from 1656 to 1661 and J.P. for Northumberland from 1657 to July 1660. In 1657 he was commissioner for assessment for Dumfries in 1657 and became joint farmer of excise for Northumberland, Cumberland and Westmorland until 1658. He was a captain of foot again from 1658 to December 1660 and commissioner for militia for Northumberland in 1659. In 1659 he was returned as representative for Dumfries Burghs in the Third Protectorate Parliament. He was commissioner for assessment for Dumfries and Northumberland in January 1660, commissioner for militia for Cumberland and Northumberland in March 1660 and governor of Newcastle from March to December 1660.

In April 1660, Tolhurst was elected Member of Parliament for Carlisle in the Convention Parliament. He was commissioner for assessment for Northumberland from August 1660 to 1661, sub-commissioner of excise for Cumberland and Westmorland from 1661 to 1662 and customs official for Newcastle by 1664. In 1669 he was a major in Sayer's Company of Foot.

Tolhurst emigrated to the West Indies before July 1671 and died intestate in Jamaica three months later.

Tolhurst married firstly by licence dated 25 September 1636, Elizabeth Soule, daughter of Robert Soule, tailor, of Rye, Sussex who brought him three houses in Rye which she had inherited. They had a daughter. She died by 1661 and he married again and had a son and three daughters.

Parliament of England
| Preceded by Thomas Cholmley; Edward Howard | Member of Parliament for Carlisle; 1660; With: William Briscoe | Succeeded by Sir Christopher Musgrave, 4th Baronet; Sir Philip Howard |
