= 1909 Dumfries Burghs by-election =

UK parliamentary by-election

The 1909 Dumfries Burghs by-election was a Parliamentary by-election held on 20 July 1909. The constituency returned one Member of Parliament (MP) to the House of Commons of the United Kingdom, elected by the first past the post voting system.

== Vacancy ==
John Gulland had been Liberal MP for the seat of Dumfries Burghs since the 1906 general election. On 5 July 1909, he was appointed as a Junior Lord of the Treasury, which meant, in accordance with the times, that he was required to resign his seat and seek re-election to parliament.

== Electoral history ==
The seat had been Liberal since the party was created. They easily held the seat at the last election, with an increased majority;

John Gulland

General election January 1906
Party	Candidate	Votes	%	±%
Liberal	John Gulland	2,035	59.2	+0.5
Conservative	Joseph J. Glover	1,402	40.8	−0.5
Majority		633	18.4	+1.0
Turnout		3,437	90.7	+6.0
Liberal hold		Swing	+0.5	

== Candidates ==
The local Liberal Association re-selected 45-year-old John Gulland to defend the seat. The Conservatives chose Bryce Duncan as their candidate.

== Campaign ==
Polling Day was fixed for 20 July 1909.

== Result ==
The Liberals held the seat with a reduced majority;

Dumfries Burghs by-election, 1909 Electorate 3,984
Party	Candidate	Votes	%	±%
Liberal	John Gulland	1,877	54.2	−5.0
Conservative	John Bryce Duncan	1,585	45.8	+5.0
Majority		292	8.4	−10.0
Turnout		3,462	86.9	−3.8
Liberal hold		Swing	-5.0	

== Aftermath ==
Gulland retained the seat at the following general election;

General election January 1910 Electorate 4,307
Party	Candidate	Votes	%	±%
Liberal	John Gulland	2,303	57.1	+2.9
Liberal Unionist	John Bryce Duncan	1,730	42.9	−2.9
Majority		573	14.2	+5.8
Turnout		4,033	93.6	+6.7
Liberal hold		Swing	+2.9	
