= John Gulland =

British Liberal Party politician (1864–1920)

John Gulland PC

Opposition Chief Whip in the House of Commons
- In office 6 December 1916 – 14 December 1918
- Leader: H. H. Asquith
- Preceded by: Edmund FitzAlan-Howard (1915)
- Succeeded by: George Thorne

Government Chief Whip in the House of Commons; Parliamentary Secretary to the Treasury
- In office 24 January 1915 – 5 December 1916
- Monarch: George V
- Prime Minister: H. H. Asquith
- Preceded by: Percy Illingworth
- Succeeded by: Neil Primrose

Lord Commissioner of the Treasury
- In office 7 July 1909 – 24 January 1915
- Prime Minister: H. H. Asquith
- Preceded by: Cecil Norton
- Succeeded by: Cecil Beck

Member of Parliament for Dumfries Burghs
- In office 8 February 1906 – 14 December 1918
- Preceded by: Robert Reid
- Succeeded by: Constituency abolished

Personal details
- Born: John William Gulland; 25 January 1864 Edinburgh, Midlothian, Scotland, UK
- Died: 26 January 1920 (aged 56)
- Party: Liberal
- Parents: John Gulland (father); Mary Ann Lovell (mother)

John William Gulland (25 January 1864 – 26 January 1920) was a British Liberal Party politician.

== Early life and career ==
Gulland was born in Edinburgh, the son of a corn merchant and banker John Gulland and Mary Ann Lovell.

== Political career ==
Gulland entered Parliament as Member for Dumfries Burghs at the 1906 general election.

He was a junior Lord of the Treasury from 1909 until 1915, when he was promoted to Parliamentary Secretary to the Treasury (Chief Whip) upon the unexpected death of Percy Illingworth. However, the Coalition Government that formed in May resulted in his sharing the post with the Conservative Lord Edmund Talbot until Asquith's Liberals left the government in 1916.

He was made a Privy Counsellor in 1917. When his constituency was abolished in 1918, he contested Dumfriesshire, but was defeated by William Murray.

== Personal life and death ==
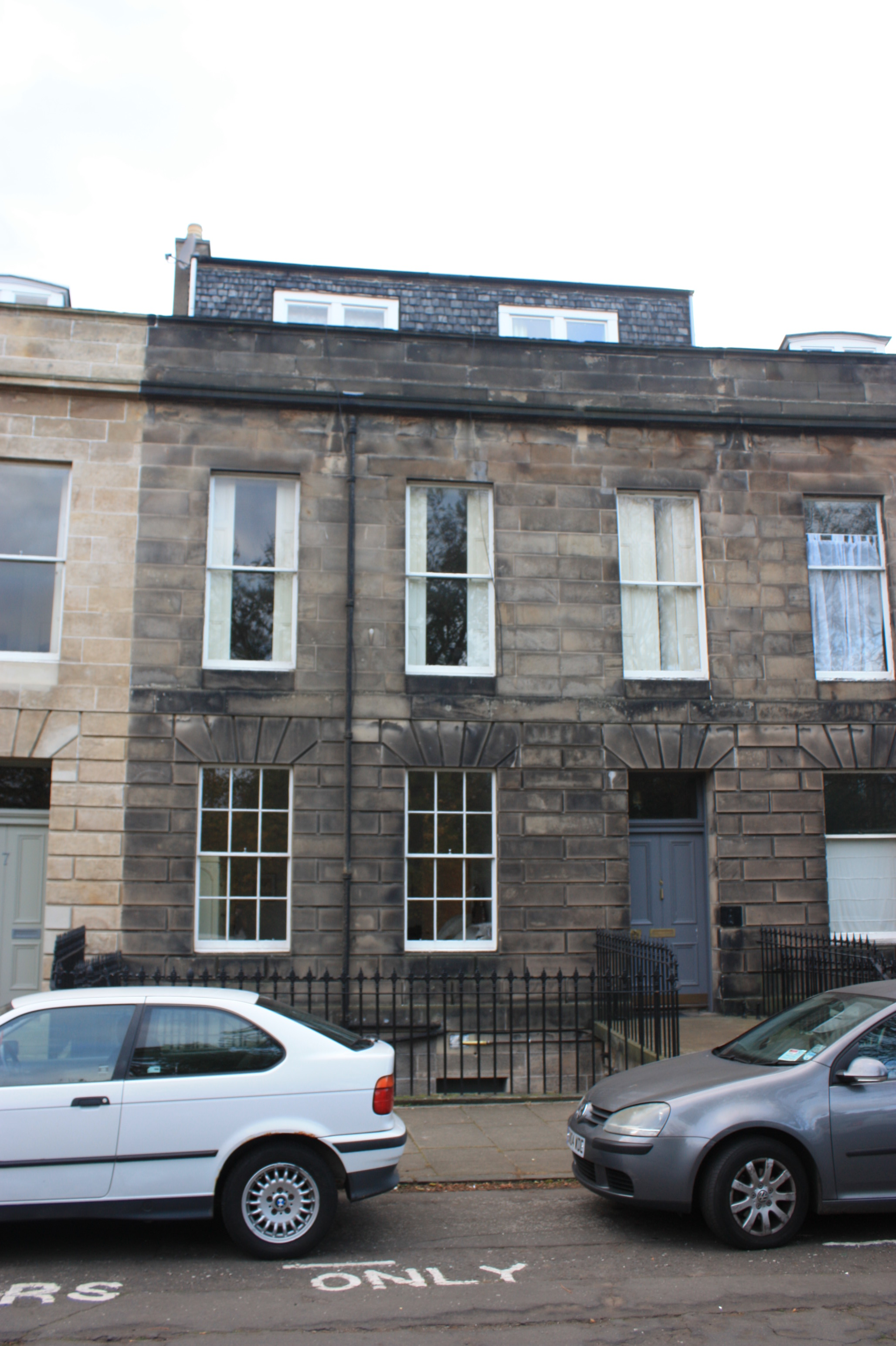
8 Claremont Crescent, Edinburgh

He lived at 8 Claremont Crescent in north-east Edinburgh.

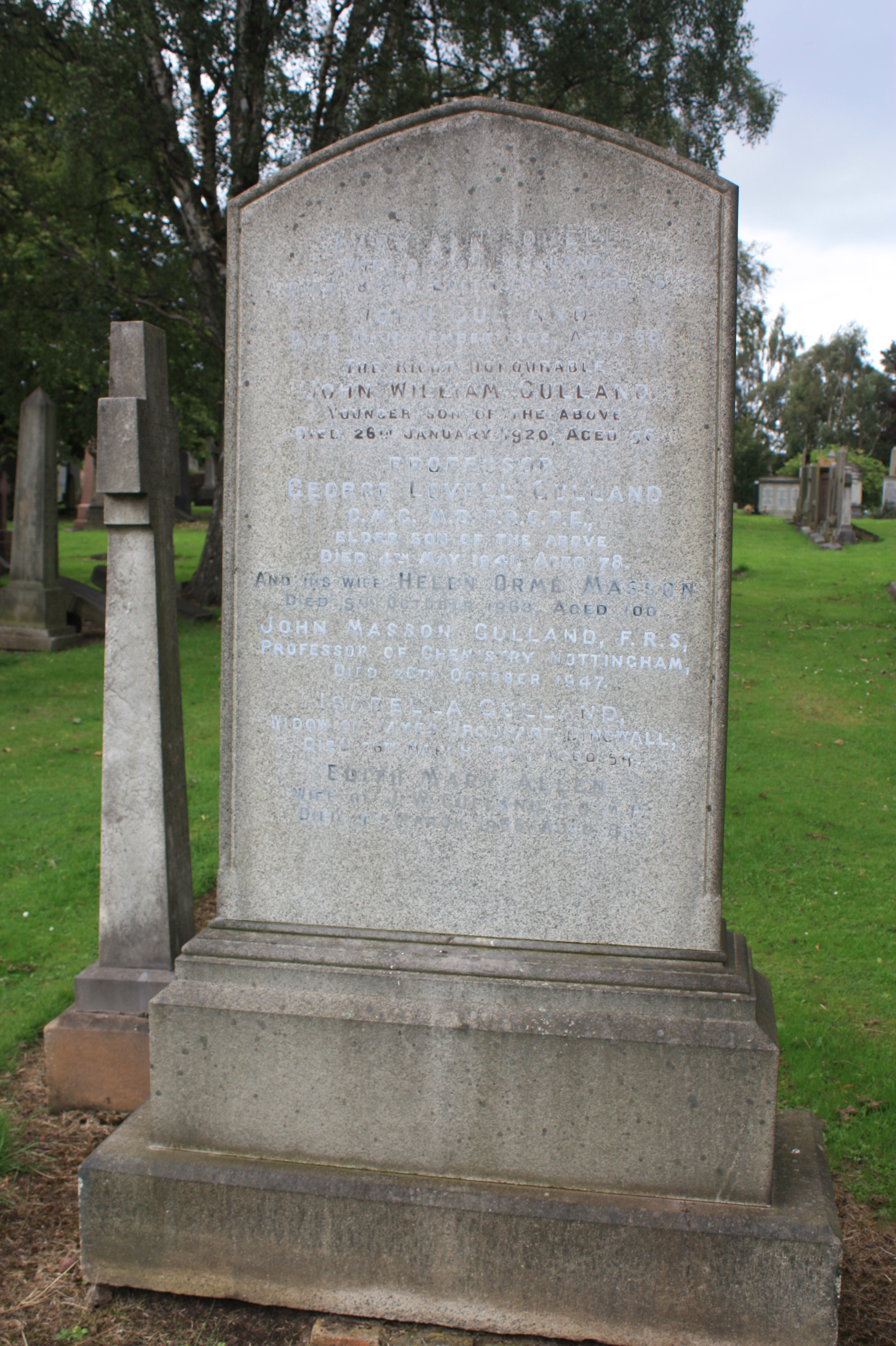
The grave of John Gulland, Grange Cemetery, Edinburgh

He died in 1920. He is buried with his family in the south-east corner of Grange Cemetery in Edinburgh, facing the south path. His nephew John Masson Gulland, killed in the Goswick rail crash, lies with him, as does his wife, Edith Mary Allen.

Parliament of the United Kingdom
Preceded by Robert Reid	Member of Parliament for Dumfries Burghs; 1906 – 1918	Constituency abolished
Political offices
Preceded by Percy Illingworth	Government Chief Whip in the House of Commons; Parliamentary Secretary to the Treasury; 1915–1916; With: Edmund FitzAlan-Howard	Succeeded by Neil Primrose
Party political offices
Preceded by Percy Illingworth	Liberal Chief Whip; 1915–1919	Succeeded by James Hogge and George Thorne
