= Robert Jardine (politician) =

Scottish businessman and Liberal politician (1825 – 1905)

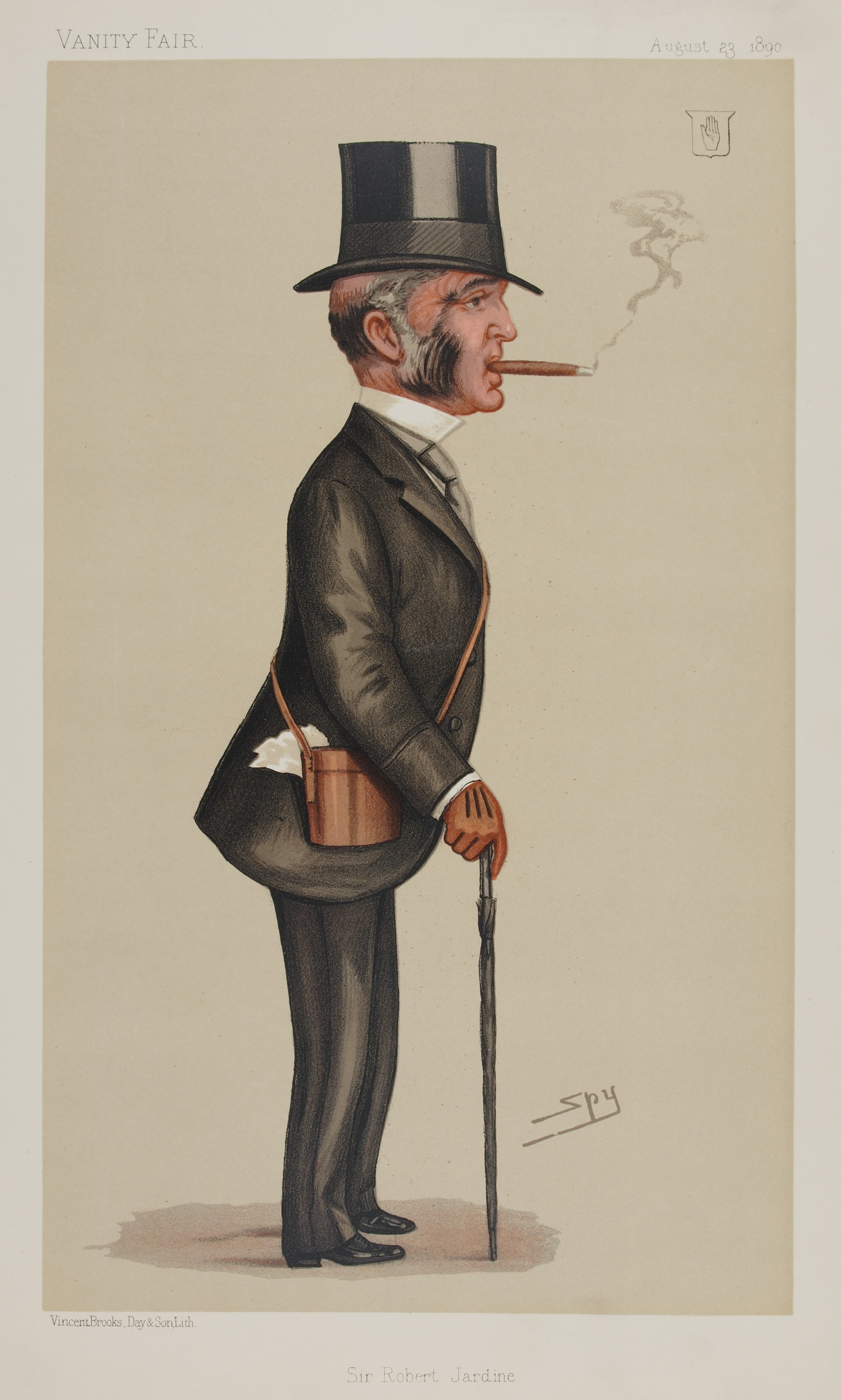
Jardine as caricatured by Spy (Leslie Ward) in Vanity Fair, August 1890

Sir Robert Jardine, 1st Baronet (24 May 1825 – 17 February 1905) was a Scottish businessman and Liberal and Liberal Unionist politician.

== Life ==
Jardine was born at Edinburgh the son of David Jardine of Muir House, Lockerbie, Dumfries and his wife Rachel Johnstone. In 1865 he became head of Jardine, Matheson and Co., one of the largest Far East trading houses based in Hong Kong.

At the general election in July 1865, Jardine was elected as Member of Parliament (MP) for Ashburton in Devon where his uncle William Jardine had been an earlier MP. The Ashburton constituency was abolished at the 1868 general election and he was elected instead at Dumfries Burghs. In 1874 he changed seat again and stood unsuccessfully for Dumfriesshire. However he was elected at the next election in March 1880 and held the seat until he stood down at the 1892 general election. Jardine was created 1st Baronet Jardine, of Castlemilk, Dumfries in June 1885. He was J.P. and Deputy Lieutenant of Perthshire. He was also a Fellow of the Royal Geographical Society.

Jardine lived at Castle Milk, Lockerbie. He died aged 79.

Jardine married Margaret Seton Hamilton, daughter of John Buchanan Hamilton, and sister and heiress of John Hamilton-Buchanan, Chief of Clan Buchanan. in April 1867. His wife died a year later.

== See also ==
- Family tree of William Jardine (1784-1843)

Parliament of the United Kingdom
Preceded by John Harvey Astell	Member of Parliament for Ashburton; 1865–1868	Constituency abolished see South Devon & East Devon
Preceded by William Ewart	Member of Parliament for Dumfries Burghs; 1868–1874	Succeeded by Ernest Noel
Preceded by John Hope-Johnstone	Member of Parliament for Dumfriesshire; 1880–1892	Succeeded by William Herries Maxwell
Baronetage of the United Kingdom
New creation	Baronet (of Castle Milk); 1885–1905	Succeeded by Robert Jardine
