= Ernest Noel =

Scottish politician (1831–1931)

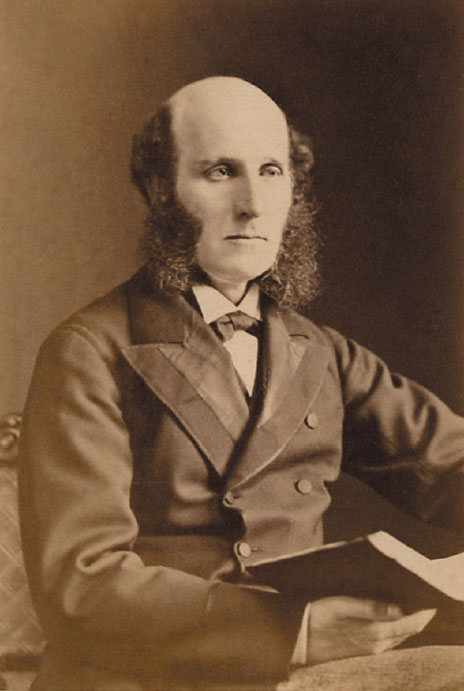
- Noel in 1883
- Born: 18 August 1831
- Died: 20 May 1931 (aged 99)
- Occupations: Member of Parliament; Businessman
- Title: Member of Parliament for Dumfries Burghs
- Term: 1874 – 1886
- Predecessor: Robert Jardine
- Successor: Robert Reid
- Spouse(s): 1. Louisa Hope (1857–1870 d.); 2. Lady Augusta Keppel (1873–1902 d.); 3. Sidney Saunders (1909–1931)

Ernest Noel, FGS (18 August 1831 – 20 May 1931) was Member of Parliament (MP) for the Scottish seat of Dumfries Burghs from 1874 to 1886. He was chairman of the Artizans, Labourers & General Dwellings Company from 1880, during the construction of a new suburb for the working classes in Wood Green which was named "Noel Park" in his honour.

== Family ==
Noel was the second son of the Reverend Baptist Wriothesley Noel and Jane Noel (née Baillie). His father was the tenth son of Sir Gerard Noel and Diana, Baroness Barham and brother of Charles Noel, 3rd Baron Barham (later 1st Earl of Gainsborough).

Noel married three times and was widowed twice:

1. 1857–1870 - Louisa Hope, daughter of Thomas Milne
2. 1873–1902 - Lady Augusta Keppel, daughter of the 6th Earl of Albemarle
3. 1909–1931 - Sidney Emily Saunders, daughter of the Reverend W Sidney Saunders

He died in May 1931 aged 99 years.

== Career ==
Noel was educated in Edinburgh, was elected a Fellow of the Geological Society in 1849,. Between 17 March 1851, and 11 Feb 1852, he partnered Hiram Williams as a Civil Mineral Engineer, Agent, and Surveyor and, together, they reported on the Hafod-y-Llan and Sygun mines in Snowdonia for a prospective buyer. He later entered Trinity College, Cambridge at the age of 25.

Between 1874 and 1886, Noel was Liberal member of Parliament for the Scottish seat of Dumfries Burghs. In the 1886 and 1892 elections he stood in Stirlingshire as a Liberal Unionist candidate but was unsuccessful both times.

From 1880, was chairman of the Artizans, Labourers & General Dwellings Company a for profit joint stock company, interested in the construction of improved housing for the working classes. The company's "Noel Park" estate at Wood Green was named in his honour. Noel was deputy chairman of the English and Scottish London Board of the Eagle, Star and British Dominions Insurance Company. He was chairman of the Mercantile Investment Trust until the age of 95.

Parliament of the United Kingdom
Preceded by Robert Jardine	Member of Parliament for Dumfries Burghs; 1874–1886	Succeeded by Robert Reid
