= Artizans, Labourers & General Dwellings Company =

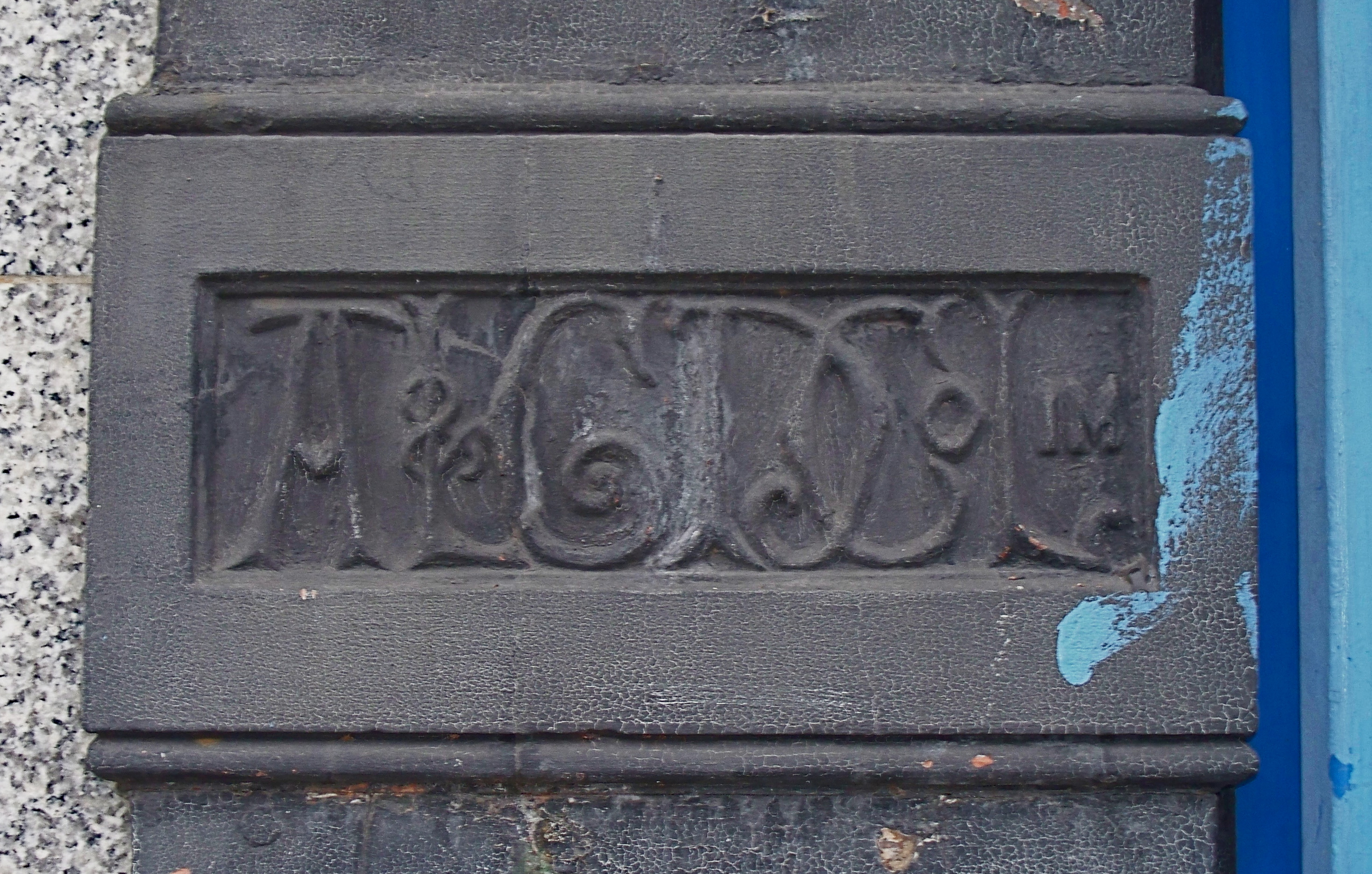
- Insignia of the Artizans Company on company-built shops, Noel Park
- Company type: Joint stock company
- Industry: Housing
- Founded: 1867
- Founder: William Austin
- Defunct: 1981
- Fate: Acquired
- Headquarters: London
- Key people: Ernest Noel MP, Lord Shaftesbury
- Products: Model Dwellings
- Parent: Sun Life Financial

The Artizans, Labourers & General Dwellings Company (Artizans Company) was a nineteenth-century philanthropic model dwellings company, which later became a multinational property developer before being absorbed into Sun Life.

== Origins ==
The Artizans Company was established in 1867 by William Austin, an illiterate who had begun his working life on a farm as a scarecrow paid 1d per day, and had worked his way up to become a drainage contractor.

The company was established as a for-profit joint stock company, with the objective of building new houses for the working classes "in consequence of the destruction of houses by railroads and other improvements". Whilst philanthropic housing companies such as the Peabody Trust and the Improved Industrial Dwellings Company would focus on multi-storey blocks of flats in the inner cities, the Artizans Company aimed to build low-rise housing in open countryside alongside existing railway lines to allow workers to live in the countryside and commute into the city. The company attracted the attention of Lord Shaftesbury, who served as president until 1875.

The company built and immediately sold a group of houses in Battersea, then still a rural village. The proceeds of the sale were used to purchase a plot of land in Salford for development, and by 1874 the company had developments in Liverpool, Birmingham, Gosport and Leeds.

== London estates ==
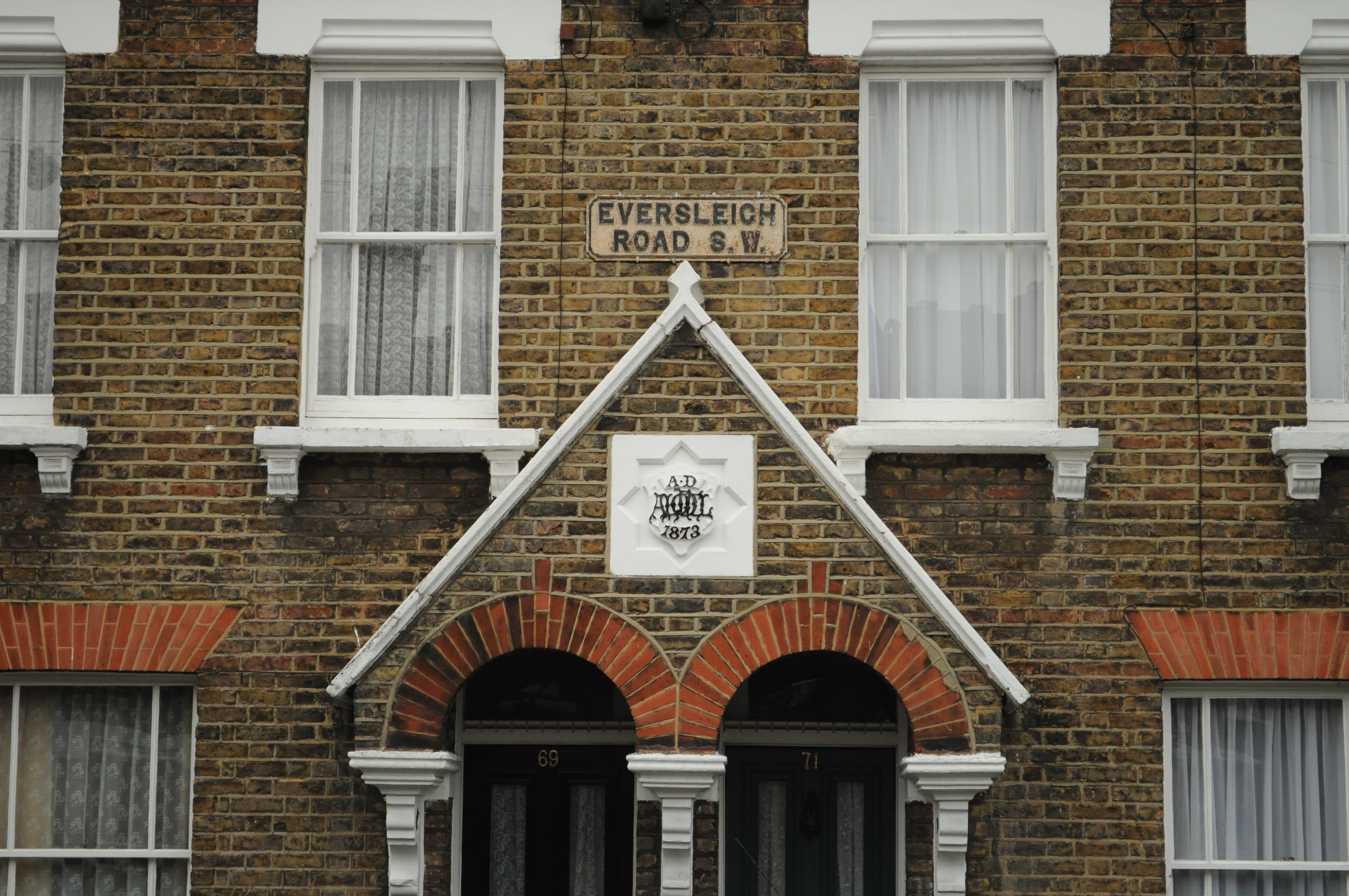
Company emblem above the door on the Shaftesbury Park Estate

The Artizans Company is best known for its four large housing estates built on the then-outskirts of London. The first was Shaftesbury Park, a development of 1,200 two-storey houses covering 42.5 acres (0.17 km^{2}; 0.07 sq mi) built in 1872 on the site of a former pig farm in Battersea. The success of Shaftesbury Park led to the construction of Queen's Park, built in 1874 on a far more ambitious scale on 76 acres (0.31 km^{2}; 0.12 sq mi) of land to the west of London, adjacent to the railway line out of Paddington (Queen's Park station opened 1879), purchased from All Souls College, Oxford. A third London estate was planned at Cann Hall, and a site of 61 acres (0.25 km^{2}; 0.10 sq mi) was purchased.

However, the Queen's Park project suffered serious mismanagement and fraud and in 1877 the company secretary William Swindlehurst and two others were found guilty of defrauding £9,312 (approximately £938,600 today) from the project. The company was forced to raise rents and tenants were no longer permitted to buy their houses; by 1880 the company's finances had recovered sufficiently to allow further expansion. A third estate, Noel Park, was built near Wood Green north of London between 1883 and 1929, followed by a fourth in Streatham at Leigham Court.

The slow take-up of available homes in Noel Park, particularly due to the Great Eastern Railway's refusal to offer third-class rail fares from the nearby Noel Park and Wood Green station, led the company to begin building centrally located tenement blocks more similar to those of other model dwellings companies. Between 1885 and 1892, the Artizans Company built 1,467 dwellings in Central London and the West End, the first being the Portman Buildings in Lisson Grove, Marylebone, opened in 1888.

== Diversification and divestment ==
In 1952, the Artizans, Labourers & General Dwellings Company was renamed the Artizans and General Properties Company Ltd. The combination of a taxation system biased against private property developments and legal restrictions on raising rents made the company's traditional model unprofitable, and it began to divest itself of its original low-rent developments and instead to sell vacant houses on the estates and to reinvest in non low-rent housing and commercial property, especially in the United States and Canada where depreciation before tax was permitted, and in Australia, Belgium and France. In 1966, ownership of the four original London estates (Shaftesbury Park, Queen's Park, Noel Park and Leigham Court) was transferred to the respective local authorities, leaving 377 homes at Pinnerwood Park in Pinner as the last residential estate in Greater London owned by the company.

In 1976, the Artizans Company, by then renamed Artagen Properties Ltd, became a wholly owned subsidiary of Sun Life, and on, 3 February 1981, the company was renamed Sun Life Properties Ltd.

== See also ==
- List of existing model dwellings
