= Matthew Sharpe (British Army officer) =

British politician

General Matthew Sharpe (1773 – 12 February 1845) was a Scottish politician and British Army officer.

He was the eldest son of Charles Sharpe of Hoddam Castle, Cummertrees, Dumfriesshire and Eleanor née Renton of Lamberton.

== Military career ==
Sharpe received his first commission as a cornet in the 16th Light Dragoons in February 1791. He rose to the rank of lieutenant two years later. In 1795, he was promoted to captain in the 28th (Duke of York's Own) Light Dragoons. He rose to be a major in 1796 and lieutenant colonel in 1799. Having served in campaigns in Flanders and Holland, the 28th Light Dragoons were disbanded in 1802, and Sharpe was placed on half pay. He returned to active service in December 1803 when he was appointed to the general staff as an inspector of yeomanry and volunteer corps. In 1809, he was promoted to the rank of major general, and in 1825, to lieutenant general. Following his retirement, he was awarded the brevet rank of general in 1841.

== Parliamentary career ==
Following the passing of the Great Reform Act, Sharpe was elected to the House of Commons as Member of Parliament (MP) for Dumfries Burghs at the 1832 general election. He was described as "a Whig of extremely liberal politics". He was re-elected in 1835 and 1837.

== Death ==
Sharpe died at his residence in Leamington Spa, Warwickshire on 2 July 1845. He was buried in the graveyard of Hoddom Parish Church.

Parliament of the United Kingdom
Preceded by Lord William Robert Keith Douglas	Member of Parliament for Dumfries Burghs; 1832 – 1841	Succeeded by William Ewart
