= Annan (Parliament of Scotland constituency) =

Annan in Dumfriesshire was a royal burgh that returned one commissioner to the Parliament of Scotland and to the Convention of Estates.

After the Acts of Union 1707, Annan, Dumfries, Kirkcudbright, Lochmaben and Sanquhar formed the Dumfries district of burghs, returning one member between them to the House of Commons of Great Britain.

== List of burgh commissioners ==
- 1661–62, 1665 convention, 1667 convention: Hew Sinclair of Englishtoun, provost
- 1669–74: William Grahame of Blastwood
- 1678 convention: David Johnston, bailie
- 1681–82: James Carruthers
- 1685–1686, 1689 convention, 1689–1695: Bryce Blair, former provost (died c.1698)
- 1698–1702, 1702–1707: William Johnstone of Sheenes

== See also ==
- List of constituencies in the Parliament of Scotland at the time of the Union
