= Dumfries (Parliament of Scotland constituency) =

Dumfries (dum-FREESS) was a royal burgh that returned one commissioner to the Parliament of Scotland and to the Convention of Estates.

After the Acts of Union 1707, Dumfries, Annan, Kirkcudbright, Lochmaben and Sanquhar formed the Dumfries district of burghs, returning one member between them to the House of Commons of Great Britain.

== List of burgh commissioners ==
- 1661, 1665 convention, 1667 convention, 1669–74: John Irving, provost
- 1678 convention, 1681–82: William Craik, provost
- 1685–86: William Fingask, baillie (died 1686)
- 1686: John Sharp of Collistoun, councillor
- 1689 (convention), 1689–93: James Kennan (died c.1694)
- 1695–1702, 1702–07: Robert Johnstone, provost

== See also ==
- List of constituencies in the Parliament of Scotland at the time of the Union
