= Dumfries Burghs =

Former parliamentary constituency in the United Kingdom

- Former district of burghs constituency for the House of Commons
- Subdivision: Dumfriesshire and Kirkcudbrightshire
- Major settlements: Dumfries, Annan, Lochmaben, Kirkcudbright

1708–1918
- Seats: One
- Created from: Annan; Dumfries; Kirkcudbright; Lochmaben; Sanquhar
- Replaced by: Dumfriesshire; Galloway

Dumfries Burghs was a district of burghs constituency of the House of Commons of Great Britain from 1708 to 1801 and of the House of Commons of the Parliament of the United Kingdom from 1801 until 1918. It elected one Member of Parliament (MP).

== Creation ==
The British parliamentary constituency was created in 1708 following the Acts of Union, 1707 and replaced the former Parliament of Scotland burgh constituencies of Dumfries, Annan, Kirkcudbright Burgh, Lochmaben and Sanquhar.

== Boundaries ==
The constituency comprised the Dumfriesshire burghs of Dumfries, Annan, Lochmaben and Sanquhar and the Kirkcudbrightshire burgh of Kirkcudbright.

== History ==
The constituency elected one Member of Parliament (MP) by the first past the post system until the seat was abolished for the 1918 general election. Dumfries, Annan, Lochmaben and Sanquhar were then merged into the county constituency of Dumfriesshire. Kirkcudbright was merged into Galloway.

== Members of Parliament ==
Election	Member	Party
1708	William Johnstone	
1710	John Hutton	
1713	Sir William Johnstone	
1715	Alexander Fergusson	
1722	William Douglas	
1727	Archibald Douglas	
1734	Charles Erskine	
1735	William Kirkpatrick	
1738	Sir Robert Laurie	
1741	Lord John Johnstone	
1743	Sir James Johnstone, 3rd Bt	
1754	Archibald Douglas	
1761	Thomas Miller	
1766	James Montgomery	
1768	William Douglas	
1780	Sir Robert Herries	
1784	Sir James Johnstone, 4th Bt	
1790	Patrick Miller	
1796	Alexander Hope	
1800	William Johnstone Hope	
1802	Charles Hope	
1803	James Stopford	
1806	Henry Erskine	
1807	Sir John Heron-Maxwell	
1812	Lord William Douglas	Tory
1832	Matthew Sharpe	Whig
1841	William Ewart	Radical
1859	William Ewart	Liberal
1868	Robert Jardine	Liberal
1874	Ernest Noel	Liberal
1886	Ernest Noel	Liberal Unionist
1886	Sir Robert Reid	Liberal
1906	John Gulland	Liberal
1918	constituency abolished	

== Elections ==
=== Elections in the 1830s ===
General election 1830: Dumfries District
Party	Candidate	Votes	%
Tory	William Douglas	Unopposed	
Registered electors		c. 95	
Tory hold			

General election 1831: Dumfries District
Party	Candidate	Votes	%
Tory	William Douglas	3	60.0
Whig	Matthew Sharpe	2	40.0
Majority		1	20.0
Turnout		5	c. 5.3
Registered electors		c. 95	
Tory hold			

General election 1832: Dumfries District
Party	Candidate	Votes	%	±%
Whig	Matthew Sharpe	488	56.9	+16.9
Whig	David Hannay	370	43.1	N/A
Majority		118	13.8	N/A
Turnout		858	88.7	c. +83.4
Registered electors		967		
Whig gain from Tory		Swing	+16.9	

General election 1835: Dumfries District
Party	Candidate	Votes	%	±%
Whig	Matthew Sharpe	422	53.3	−3.6
Whig	David Hannay	370	46.7	+3.6
Majority		52	6.6	−7.2
Turnout		792	79.3	−9.4
Registered electors		999		
Whig hold		Swing	−3.6	

General election 1837: Dumfries District
Party	Candidate	Votes	%
Whig	Matthew Sharpe	Unopposed	
Registered electors		1,050	
Whig hold			

=== Elections in the 1840s ===
General election 1841: Dumfries District
Party	Candidate	Votes	%	±%
Radical	William Ewart	402	54.0	N/A
Whig	Alexander Johnston	342	46.0	N/A
Majority		60	8.0	N/A
Turnout		744	76.2	N/A
Registered electors		977		
Radical gain from Whig				

General election 1847: Dumfries District
Party	Candidate	Votes	%	±%
Radical	William Ewart	Unopposed		
Registered electors		892		
Radical hold				

=== Elections in the 1850s ===
General election 1852: Dumfries District
Party	Candidate	Votes	%	±%
Radical	William Ewart	Unopposed		
Registered electors		881		
Radical hold				

General election 1857: Dumfries District
Party	Candidate	Votes	%	±%
Radical	William Ewart	506	73.2	N/A
Conservative	James Hannay	185	26.8	New
Majority		321	46.4	N/A
Turnout		691	78.3	N/A
Registered electors		882		
Radical hold		Swing	N/A	

General election 1859: Dumfries District
Party	Candidate	Votes	%	±%
Liberal	William Ewart	432	51.7	−21.5
Conservative	George Gustavus Walker	403	48.3	+21.5
Majority		29	3.4	−43.0
Turnout		835	86.4	+8.1
Registered electors		966		
Liberal hold		Swing	−21.5	

=== Elections in the 1860s ===
General election 1865: Dumfries District
Party	Candidate	Votes	%	±%
Liberal	William Ewart	540	58.4	+6.7
Independent Liberal	John Clark Kennedy	384	41.6	New
Majority		156	16.8	+13.4
Turnout		924	82.2	−4.2
Registered electors		1,124		
Liberal hold		Swing	+6.7	

General election 1868: Dumfries District
Party	Candidate	Votes	%	±%
Liberal	Robert Jardine	1,125	51.0	−7.4
Independent Liberal	Ernest Noel	1,083	49.0	+7.4
Majority		42	2.0	−14.8
Turnout		2,208	93.8	+11.6
Registered electors		2,353		
Liberal hold		Swing		

=== Elections in the 1870s ===
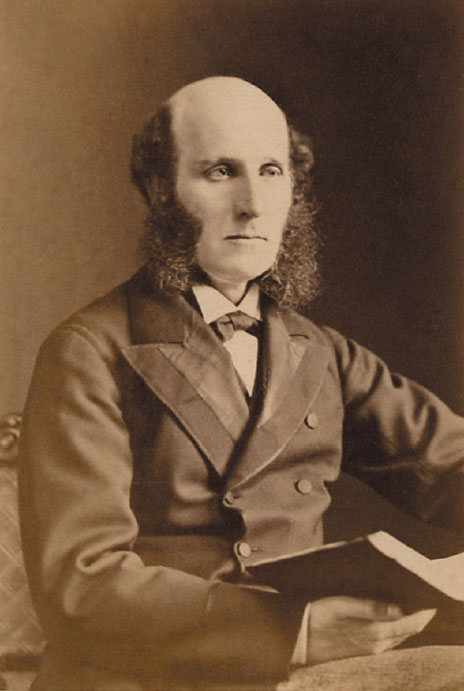
Noel

General election 1874: Dumfries Burghs
Party	Candidate	Votes	%	±%
Liberal	Ernest Noel	1,420	55.9	+4.9
Conservative	Morden Carthew Yorstoun	1,122	44.1	New
Majority		298	11.8	+9.8
Turnout		2,542	89.7	−4.1
Registered electors		2,833		
Liberal hold		Swing	N/A	

=== Elections in the 1880s ===
General election 1880: Dumfries Burghs
Party	Candidate	Votes	%	±%
Liberal	Ernest Noel	1,700	64.7	+8.8
Conservative	William Gordon	872	33.2	−10.9
Ind. Conservative	Theodore Edgar Dickson Byrne	54	2.1	New
Majority		828	31.5	+19.7
Turnout		2,626	89.6	−0.1
Registered electors		2,931		
Liberal hold		Swing	+9.9	

General election 1885: Dumfries Burghs
Party	Candidate	Votes	%	±%
Liberal	Ernest Noel	1,546	53.1	−11.6
Conservative	Miles Walker Mattinson	1,363	46.9	+13.7
Majority		183	6.2	−25.3
Turnout		2,909	92.4	+2.8
Registered electors		3,147		
Liberal hold		Swing	−12.7	

General election 1886: Dumfries Burghs
Party	Candidate	Votes	%	±%
Liberal	Robert Reid	1,547	56.0	+2.9
Conservative	Miles Walker Mattinson	1,217	44.0	−2.9
Majority		330	12.0	+5.8
Turnout		2,764	87.8	−4.6
Registered electors		3,147		
Liberal hold		Swing	+2.9	

=== Elections in the 1890s ===
General election 1892: Dumfries Burghs
Party	Candidate	Votes	%	±%
Liberal	Robert Reid	1,698	59.3	+3.3
Liberal Unionist	Andrew Agnew	1,166	40.7	−3.3
Majority		532	18.6	+6.6
Turnout		2,864	86.1	−1.7
Registered electors		3,325		
Liberal hold		Swing	+3.3	

Reid is appointed Solicitor General for Scotland, requiring a by-election.

By-election, 1894: Dumfries Burghs
Party	Candidate	Votes	%	±%
Liberal	Robert Reid	Unopposed		
Liberal hold				

Reid

General election 1895: Dumfries Burghs
Party	Candidate	Votes	%	±%
Liberal	Robert Reid	1,785	60.1	+0.8
Conservative	William Murray	1,185	39.9	−0.8
Majority		600	20.2	+1.6
Turnout		2,970	85.9	−0.2
Registered electors		3,456		
Liberal hold		Swing	+0.8	

=== Elections in the 1900s ===
General election 1900: Dumfries Burghs
Party	Candidate	Votes	%	±%
Liberal	Robert Reid	1,847	58.7	−1.4
Liberal Unionist	William Murray	1,300	41.3	+1.4
Majority		547	17.4	−2.8
Turnout		3,147	84.7	−1.2
Registered electors		3,717		
Liberal hold		Swing	-1.4	

Gulland

General election 1906: Dumfries Burghs
Party	Candidate	Votes	%	±%
Liberal	John Gulland	2,035	59.2	+0.5
Conservative	Joseph J. Glover	1,402	40.8	−0.5
Majority		633	18.4	+1.0
Turnout		3,437	90.7	+6.0
Registered electors		3,790		
Liberal hold		Swing	+0.5	

1909 Dumfries Burghs by-election
Party	Candidate	Votes	%	±%
Liberal	John Gulland	1,877	54.2	−5.0
Conservative	John Bryce Duncan	1,585	45.8	+5.0
Majority		292	8.4	−10.0
Turnout		3,462	86.9	−3.8
Registered electors		3,984		
Liberal hold		Swing	-5.0	

=== Elections in the 1910s ===
General election January 1910: Dumfries Burghs
Party	Candidate	Votes	%	±%
Liberal	John Gulland	2,303	57.1	−2.1
Conservative	John Bryce Duncan	1,730	42.9	+2.1
Majority		573	14.2	−4.2
Turnout		4,033	93.6	+2.9
Registered electors		4,307		
Liberal hold		Swing	−2.1	

General election December 1910: Dumfries Burghs
Party	Candidate	Votes	%	±%
Liberal	John Gulland	2,315	59.2	+2.1
Conservative	John Pollok-McCall	1,596	40.8	−2.1
Majority		719	18.4	+4.2
Turnout		3,911	91.1	−2.5
Registered electors		4,294		
Liberal hold		Swing	+2.1	

General Election 1914–15:

Another General Election was required to take place before the end of 1915. The political parties had been making preparations for an election to take place and by July 1914, the following candidates had been selected;

- Liberal: John Gulland
- Unionist: Sir Archibald Mclnnes Shaw
