= Lochmaben (Parliament of Scotland constituency) =

Lochmaben in Dumfriesshire was a royal burgh that returned one commissioner to the Parliament of Scotland and to the Convention of Estates.

After the Acts of Union 1707, Lochmaben, Annan, Dumfries, Kirkcudbright and Sanquhar formed the Dumfries district of burghs, returning one member between them to the House of Commons of Great Britain.

== List of burgh commissioners ==
- 1661–63, 1665 convention, 1667 convention, 1669–74, 1678 convention, 1681–82: John Johnston of Elshieshields, provost
- 1685–86, 1689 convention, 1689–1690: Thomas Kennedy of Hallethes (died c.1694)
- 1695–1702: William Menzies, Edinburgh merchant
- 1702–07: John Carruthers of Denbie

== See also ==
- List of constituencies in the Parliament of Scotland at the time of the Union
