= Sanquhar (Parliament of Scotland constituency) =

Sanquhar in Dumfriesshire was a royal burgh that returned one commissioner to the Parliament of Scotland and to the Convention of Estates.

After the Acts of Union 1707, Sanquhar, Annan, Dumfries, Kirkcudbright and Lochmaben formed the Dumfries district of burghs, returning one member between them to the House of Commons of Great Britain.

== List of burgh commissioners ==
- 1661–62, 1665 convention, 1667 convention, 1669–72, 1678 convention, 1681–82: Robert Carmichael of Corp, provost
- 1685–86: John Carmichell, provost
- 1689 (convention), 1689–1690: John Boswall (died c.1690)
- 1693–1702: Sir Alexander Bruce of Broomhall (expelled 1702)
- 1702, 1702–07: William Alves, commissary of Dumfries

== See also ==
- List of constituencies in the Parliament of Scotland at the time of the Union
