= Kirkcudbright (Parliament of Scotland constituency) =

Kirkcudbright was a royal burgh that returned one commissioner to the Parliament of Scotland and to the Convention of Estates.

After the Acts of Union 1707, the commissioner for Kirkcudbright was one of the Scottish representatives to the first Parliament of Great Britain. From 1708 Kirkcudbright, Annan, Dumfries, Lochmaben and Sanquhar formed the Dumfries district of burghs, returning one member between them to the House of Commons of Great Britain.

== List of burgh commissioners ==
- 1661: John Ewart, provost
- 1665 convention, 1667 convention, 1669–74: John Glendening, provost
- 1678 convention: William Ewart, provost
- 1681–82: Samuel Cairmunt
- 1685–86: Hendry Muir, bailie (died c.1685)
- 1686: John Callender, merchant-burgess
- 1689 convention, 1689–95: John Ewart, former provost (excused on grounds of age and infirmity, died c.1698)
- 1700–1702, 1702–07: Andrew Hume

== See also ==
- List of constituencies in the Parliament of Scotland at the time of the Union
