= William Murray (Dumfriesshire MP) =

Scottish politician

Major William Murray (1865 – 5 March 1923) was a Liberal Unionist and later Unionist Party politician in Scotland. He was elected at 1918 general election as the Member of Parliament (MP) for Dumfriesshire, as a Coalition Unionist, but did not stand again at the 1922 election.

Murray had earlier contested the seat as a Liberal Unionist in both the January 1910 and December 1910 general elections, but lost on both occasions by margins (by margins of 6.6% and 6.4% respectively). He had also stood twice without success in the Dumfries Burghs constituency, at the 1895 and 1900 general elections.

Parliament of the United Kingdom
Preceded by Percy Molteno	Member of Parliament for Dumfriesshire; 1918 – 1922	Succeeded by William Chapple
