= List of Commissioners elected to the Parliament of Scotland in 1702 =

This is a list of commissioners elected to the Parliament of Scotland in the 1702 Scottish general election. The representation of the burghs and those of the shires and stewartries consisted of 154 Commissioners elected from 99 constituencies (66 burgh constituencies and 33 shire constituencies).

SP Constituency	Shire or Stewartry	Number of Commissioners	Period of service	Names of Commissioners	Scottish representatives to the first Parliament of Great Britain
Aberdeen	Aberdeenshire	1	1702–07	John Allerdes, provost	
Aberdeenshire	Aberdeenshire	4	1702–07	James Moir of Stoniewood	
Aberdeenshire	Aberdeenshire	4	1702–07	Sir William Seton of Pitmedden	X
Aberdeenshire	Aberdeenshire	4	1702–07	Sir Alexander Gordone of Pitlurg	
Aberdeenshire	Aberdeenshire	4	1702–07	John Udnie of that Ilk	
Annan	Dumfries & Annandale	1	1702–07	William Johnstone of Sheenes	
Anstruther Easter	Fifeshire	1	1702–07	Sir John Anstruther	
Anstruther Wester	Fifeshire	1	1702–07	Sir Robert Anstruther of Wrae and Balcaskie	
Arbroath	Forfarshire	1	1702–07	John Hutchison, provost	
Argyllshire	Argyllshire	3	1702–07	John Campbell of Mamore	X
Argyllshire	Argyllshire	3	1702–07	Sir James Campbell of Auchinbreck	X
Argyllshire	Argyllshire	3	1702–07	James Campbell of Ardkinglass	X
Ayr	Ayrshire	1	1702–07	John Moore, provost	
Ayrshire	Ayrshire	3	1702–07	Francis Montgomerie of Giffen	X
Ayrshire	Ayrshire	3	1702–07	William Dalrymple of Drongan	X
Ayrshire	Ayrshire	3	1702–07	Sir Hugh Cathcart of Carleton	
Ayrshire	Ayrshire	3	1702–07	John Crawford of Kilbirnie (created Viscount of Mount Crawford 10 April 1703)	
Ayrshire	Ayrshire	3	1703-07	John Brisbane of Bishopton, yr	
Banff	Banffshire	1	1702, 1703–07	Sir Alexander Ogilvy	
Banffshire	Banffshire	2	1702–06	Alexander Duff	
Banffshire	Banffshire	2	1702–07	James Ogilvie	
Banffshire	Banffshire	2	1706-07	Alexander Abercromby of Glasshaugh	X
Berwickshire	Berwickshire	4	1702–07	Sir John Swinton of that Ilk	X
Berwickshire	Berwickshire	4	1702-06	Sir John Home of Blackadder	
Berwickshire	Berwickshire	4	1702–07	Sir Robert Sinclair of Longformacus	
Berwickshire	Berwickshire	4	1702-07	Sir Patrick Home of Rentoun	
Berwickshire	Berwickshire	4	1706–07	Sir Alexander Campbell of Cesnock	
Brechin	Forfarshire	1	1702–07	Francis Mollyson, dean of guild	
Burntisland	Fifeshire	1	1702–07	Sir John Erskine of Alva	X
Buteshire	Buteshire	2	1702–03	Sir James Stewart (or Stuart) of Bute, Sheriff of Bute (ennobled 1703)	
Buteshire	Buteshire	2	1702–07	Robert Stewart of Tillicoultry	
Buteshire	Buteshire	2	1704–07	John Steuart of Kinwhinlick	
Caithness-shire	Caithness-shire	2	1702-05	Sir George Sinclair of Clyth (died c.1705)	
Caithness-shire	Caithness-shire	2	1703–07	Sir James Sinclair of Dunbeath	
Caithness-shire	Caithness-shire	2	1706–07	Sir James Dunbar of Hempriggs	
Campbeltown	Argyllshire	1	1702–07	Charles Campbell	
Clackmannanshire	Clackmannanshire	1	1703-07	Alexander Abercromby of Tullibody	
Crail	Fifeshire	1	1702–07	George Moncrieff of Sanchope	
Cromartyshire	Cromartyshire	2	1702–07	Sir Kenneth Mackenzie of Cromarty and Grandvale	X
Cromartyshire	Cromartyshire	2	1703–07	Aeneas McLeod of Cadboll	
Cullen	Banffshire	1	1702-07	Patrick Ogilvy	X
Culross	Perthshire	1	1702-07	Sir David Dalrymple, 1st Baronet	X
Cupar	Fifeshire	1	1702–07	Patrick Bruce of Banzion	
Dingwall	Ross-shire	1	1702–07	John Bayne the younger of Tulloch	
Dornoch	Sutherlandshire	1	1702–07	John Urquhart of Meldrum	
Dumbarton	Dunbartonshire	1	1702–07	James Smollett of Bonhill, provost	X
Dumbartonshire	Dunbartonshire	2	1702–07	William Cochrane of Kilmaranock	
Dumbartonshire	Dunbartonshire	2	1702–07	Sir Humphrey Colquhoun of Luss	
Dumfries	Dumfries & Annandale	1	1702–07	Robert Johnstone, provost	
Dumfriesshire	Dumfries & Annandale	4	1702–07	Sir John Johnstone of Westerhall	X
Dumfriesshire	Dumfries & Annandale	4	1702–07	William Douglass of Dornock	
Dumfriesshire	Dumfries & Annandale	4	1702, 1702–07	John Sharp of Hoddam	
Dumfriesshire	Dumfries & Annandale	4	1702–07	Alexander Fergussone of Isle	
Dunbar	Haddingtonshire	1	1702–07	Robert Kellie, bailie	
Dundee	Forfarshire	1	1702–07	John Scrymgeour of Kirktoun, provost	
Dunfermline	Fifeshire	1	1702–05	Sir James Halkett of Pitfirrane (died 1705)	
Dunfermline	Fifeshire	1	1705–07	Sir Peter Halkett of Pitfirrane	X
Dysart	Fifeshire	1	1702–03	David Chrystie of Balsillie (died c.1702)	
Dysart	Fifeshire	1	1703–04	George Essone, merchant (died c.1705)	
Dysart	Fifeshire	1	1704–07	John Black, bailie	
Edinburgh	Edinburghshire	2	1702–07	Sir Patrick Johnston	X
Edinburgh	Edinburghshire	2	1702–07	Robert Inglis	
Edinburghshire	Edinburghshire	4	1702–07	Robert Dundas of Arniston	
Edinburghshire	Edinburghshire	4	1702-03	Sir James Primrose of Carrington (created Viscount of Primrose in 1703)	
Edinburghshire	Edinburghshire	4	1702–07	Sir Robert Dickson of Inveresk	
Edinburghshire	Edinburghshire	4	1702–07	George Lockhart of Carnwath	
Edinburghshire	Edinburghshire	4	1703–07	Sir James Foulis of Colinton	
Elgin	Elgin & Forresshire	1	1702–07	William Sutherland	
Elgin & Forresshire	Elgin & Forresshire	2	1702–04	James Brodie of that Ilk	
Elgin & Forresshire	Elgin & Forresshire	2	1702	Alexander Dunbar of Westfield (sheriff) (died c1702)	
Elgin & Forresshire	Elgin & Forresshire	2	1703–05	Robert Dunbar of Grangehill (died c.1705)	
Elgin & Forresshire	Elgin & Forresshire	2	1704–07	Sir Harry Innes, 4th Baronet	
Fifeshire	Fifeshire	4	1702–07	Sir William Anstruther of that Ilk	
Fifeshire	Fifeshire	4	1702–07	Henry Balfour of Dunbog	
Fifeshire	Fifeshire	4	1702–07	David Bethune of Balfour	
Fifeshire	Fifeshire	4	1702–03	Sir Patrick Murray of Pitdunnes (died in office)	
Fifeshire	Fifeshire	4	1703–06	Robert Douglas of Strathendrie (from 1703; died in office)	
Fifeshire	Fifeshire	4	1706	Sir Archibald Hope of Rankeillour (from 25 April 1706; died 10 October 1706)	
Fifeshire	Fifeshire	4	1706–07	Thomas Hope of Rankeillour	
Forfar	Forfarshire	1	1702–07	John Lyon, sheriff clerk	
Forfarshire	Forfarshire	4	1702-1707	James Carnegie of Findhaven	
Forfarshire	Forfarshire	4	1702-1707	David Graham of Fintrie, younger	
Forfarshire	Forfarshire	4	1702-1707	James Haliburton of Pitcur	X
Forfarshire	Forfarshire	4	1702-1707	Patrick Lyon of Auchterhouse	
Forres	Elgin & Forresshire	1	1702–07	George Brodie of Ailisk	
Fortrose	Ross-shire	1	1702–03	John Mackenzie of Assint, provost (died c.1703)	
Fortrose	Ross-shire	1	1703–07	Roderick McKenzie of Prestonhall	
Glasgow	Lanarkshire	1	1702–1707	Hugh Montgomerie of Busbie, provost	X
Haddington	Haddingtonshire	1	1702–07	Alexander Edgar, former provost	
Haddingtonshire	Haddingtonshire	4	1702–1707	Andrew Fletcher of Saltoun	
Haddingtonshire	Haddingtonshire	4	1702–1707	John Cockburn, younger of Ormiston	X
Haddingtonshire	Haddingtonshire	4	1702–1707	Sir John Lauder of Fountainhall	
Haddingtonshire	Haddingtonshire	4	1702–1707	William Nisbet of Dirleton	X
Inveraray	Argyllshire	1	1702–07	Daniel (or Donald) Campbell of Ardintenie	X
Inverbervie	Kincardineshire	1	1702–1707	Alexander Arbuthnott, after 1704 known as Alexander Maitland	X
Inverkeithing	Fifeshire	1	1702–07	James Spittell, provost	
Inverness	Inverness-shire	1	1702–07	Alexander Duff of Drumure	
Inverness-shire	Inverness-shire	2	1702–05	Ludovick Grant of that Ilk	
Inverness-shire	Inverness-shire	2	1702-07	Alexander Grant of that Ilk	X
Inverurie	Aberdeenshire	1	1702–07	Sir Robert Forbes of Learnie	
Irvine	Ayrshire	1	1702–05	Alexander Cunynghame of Collellan (died c.1705)	
Irvine	Ayrshire	1	1705–07	George Monro, baillie	
Jedburgh	Roxburghshire	1	1702–07	Walter Scott, provost	
Kilrenny	Fifeshire	1	1702–07	James Bethune, eldest son of David Bethune of Balfour, the 14th laird of Balfour, voted against the union	
Kincardineshire	Kincardineshire	2	1702–1707	Sir Thomas Burnett of Leys	X
Kincardineshire	Kincardineshire	2	1702–04	Sir James Falconer of Phesdoe (died 1705)	
Kincardineshire	Kincardineshire	2	1705–07	Sir David Ramsay of Balmain	X
Kinghorn	Fifeshire	1	1702–1705	James Melvill of Halhill (died c.1705)	
Kinghorn	Fifeshire	1	1706-1707	Patrick Moncreiff	X
Kinross-shire	Kinross-shire	1	1702–07	John Bruce of Kinross	X
Kintore	Aberdeenshire	1	1703–07	Sir George Allardice	X
Kirkcaldy	Fifeshire	1	1702–07	James Oswald, dean of guild	
Kirkcudbright Burgh	Kirkcudbrightshire	1	1702–07	Andrew Hume	X
Kirkcudbrightshire	Kirkcudbrightshire	2	1702–07	William Maxwell of Cardoness	
Kirkcudbrightshire	Kirkcudbrightshire	2	1702–1703	John Murray of Broughton	
Kirkcudbrightshire	Kirkcudbrightshire	2	1704–07	Alexander McKie of Palgowan	
Kirkwall	Orkney	1	1702–07	Robert Douglas	
Lanark	Lanarkshire	1	1702–07	William Carmichaell, advocate	
Lanarkshire	Lanarkshire	4	1702-07	George Baillie of Jerviswood	X
Lanarkshire	Lanarkshire	4	1702-07	John Sinclair, yr of Stevenson	
Lanarkshire	Lanarkshire	4	1702-07	William Baillie of Lamington	
Lanarkshire	Lanarkshire	4	1702-07	James Hamilton of Aikenhead	
Lauder	Berwickshire	1	1702–07	Sir David Cunynghame of Milncraig	
Linlithgow	Linlithgowshire	1	1702–07	Walter Stewart of Pardovein, former provost	
Linlithgowshire	Linlithgowshire	2	1703–07	Thomas Sharp of Houston	
Linlithgowshire	Linlithgowshire	2	1702–03	Charles Hope of Hopeton (died c.1703)	
Linlithgowshire	Linlithgowshire	2	1704–07	John Montgomerie of Wrae	
Lochmaben	Dumfries & Annandale	1	1702–07	John Carruthers of Denbie	
Montrose	Forfarshire	1	1702–7	James Scott of Logie	X
Nairn	Nairnshire	1	1703–7	John Rose	
Nairnshire	Nairnshire	2	1702–1707	Hugh Rose of Kilravock	X
Nairnshire	Nairnshire	2	1702–1703	Duncan Forbes of Culloden (died 1704)	
Nairnshire	Nairnshire	2	1704–1707	John Forbes of Culloden	
New Galloway	Kirkcudbrightshire	1	1703-1707	George Home of Whitfield	
North Berwick	Haddingtonshire	1	1702–07	Sir Hew Dalrymple of North Berwick	
Orkney & Shetland	Orkney & Zetland	2	1702–04	Sir Archibald Stewart of Burray (died 1704)	
Orkney & Shetland	Orkney & Zetland	2	1702-07	Alexander Douglas of Eagleshay	X
Peebles	Peeblesshire	1	1702–07	Archibald Shiells, provost	
Peeblesshire	Peeblesshire	2	1702-07	William Morison of Prestoungrange	X
Peeblesshire	Peeblesshire	2	1702-07	Alexander Horseburgh of that Ilk	
Perth	Perthshire	1	1702–07	Alexander Robertson of Craig	
Perthshire	Perthshire	4	1702	William Oliphant of Gask (died c1702)	
Perthshire	Perthshire	4	1702–07	Sir Patrick Murray of Ochtertyre	
Perthshire	Perthshire	4	1702-07	Mungo Graham of Gorthie	X
Perthshire	Perthshire	4	1702–07	John Haldane of Gleneagles	X
Perthshire	Perthshire	4	1704–07	John Murray of Strowan	
Pittenweem	Fifeshire	1	1702–07	George Smyth the younger of Giblistoun	
Queensferry	Linlithgowshire	1	1702–04	Sir William Hamilton of Whytelaw, Lord Whitelaw; Senator of the College of Justice (died c.1704)	
Queensferry	Linlithgowshire	1	1705–07	Sir James Stewart of Goodtrees	
Renfrew	Renfrewshire	1	1702–07	Colin Campbell of Woodside	
Renfrewshire	Renfrewshire	3	1702–07	Sir John Houston, 2nd Baronet, of that Ilk	
Renfrewshire	Renfrewshire	3	1702–04	John Stewart, younger of Blackhall	
Renfrewshire	Renfrewshire	3	1702–07	Sir Robert Pollok of that Ilk	X
Ross-shire	Ross-shire	2	1702–07	Sir Kenneth Mackenzie of Scatwell	
Ross-shire	Ross-shire	2	1702–04	Sir Kenneth Mackenzie of Gairloch (died 1704)	
Ross-shire	Ross-shire	2	1704–07	George Mackenzie of Cromarty and Grandvale	
Rothesay	Buteshire	1	1702–07	Dougald Stewart of Blairhall	
Roxburghshire	Roxburghshire	4	1702–0	Sir William Kerr of Greenhead	X
Roxburghshire	Roxburghshire	4	1702–07	Sir William Bennett of Grubbet	X
Roxburghshire	Roxburghshire	4	1702–07	Archibald Douglas, 13th of Cavers, Sheriff of Roxburgh	X
Roxburghshire	Roxburghshire	4	1702-07	Sir Gilbert Elliot of Minto	
Rutherglen	Lanarkshire	1	1702–07	George Spens, provost	
St Andrews	Fifeshire	1	1702–07	Alexander Warson of Aithernie	
Sanquhar	Dumfries & Annandale	1	1702–07	William Alves, commissary of Dumfries	
Selkirk	Selkirkshire	1	1702–07	Robert Scott	
Selkirkshire	Selkirkshire	2	1702	Sir James Murray of Philiphaugh; elected for Selkirkshire but sat instead as Lord Clerk Register	
Selkirkshire	Selkirkshire	2	1702–07	John Murray of Bowhill	X
Selkirkshire	Selkirkshire	2	1703–07	John Pringle of Haining (replacing Philiphaugh)	X
Stirling	Stirlingshire	1	1702–07	John Erskine	X
Stirlingshire	Stirlingshire	3	1702–1707	John Grahame of Killearne	
Stirlingshire	Stirlingshire	3	1702–1707	James Grahame of Buchlyvie	
Stirlingshire	Stirlingshire	3	1702–1707	Robert Rollo of Powhouse	
Stranraer	Wigtownshire	1	1702–07	George Dalrymple (son of Viscount Stair)	
Sutherlandshire	Sutherlandshire	1	1702–04	David Sutherland the younger of Kinnauld	
Tain	Ross-shire	1	1702–07	Captain Daniel MacLeod	
Whithorn	Wigtownshire	1	1702–1707	John Clerk of Penicuik	X
Wick	Caithness-shire	1	1702–07	Robert Fraser	
Wigtown	Wigtownshire	1	1702-07	William Coltrane of Drummorrell, provost	
Wigtownshire	Wigtownshire	2	1702–07	William Steuart the elder of Castlesteuart	
Wigtownshire	Wigtownshire	2	1702–07	John Stewart	X

== Sources ==
- Cokayne, George Edward (1902). Complete Baronetage. Vol. II. Exeter: William Pollard & Co Ltd.
- Cokayne, George Edward (1903). Complete Baronetage. Vol. III. Exeter: William Pollard & Co Ltd.
- Cokayne, George Edward (1904). Complete Baronetage. Vol. IV. Exeter: William Pollard & Co Ltd.
- Foster, Joseph (1882). Members of Parliament, Scotland. London and Aylesbury: Hazell, Watson & Viney.
