= Cupar Burghs (Commonwealth Parliament constituency) =

- Former constituency for the Protectorate Parliament
- Region: Scotland

Former constituency
- Created: 1654
- Abolished: 1659
- Created from: Scotland
- Replaced by: St Andrews, Dysart, Kirkcaldy, Cupar, Anstruther Easter, Pittenweem, Crail, Kinghorn, Anstruther Wester, Pittenweem, Inverkeithing, Kilrenny, Burntisland

During the Commonwealth of England, Scotland and Ireland, called the Protectorate, the Scottish burghs of St Andrews, Dysart, Kirkcaldy, Cupar, Anstruther Easter, Pittenweem. Crail, Dunfermline, Kinghorn, Anstruther Wester, Inverkeithing, Kilrenny and Burntisland were jointly represented by one Member of Parliament in the House of Commons at Westminster, elected in Cupar, from 1654 until 1659.
