= Anstruther (disambiguation) =

Anstruther is a Scottish town and surname.

Anstruther may also refer to:

== People ==
- Anstruther baronets
- Clan Anstruther
- Alexander Anstruther (cricketer) (1846–1902), Indian-born English cricketer
- Eva Anstruther (1869–1935), English writer and poet
- Henry Torrens Anstruther (1860–1926), Scottish Liberal Unionist politician
- Philip Anstruther (British Army officer) (1682–1760), Scottish professional soldier and politician
- Robert Anstruther (British Army officer) (1768–1809), Scottish general
- Robert Anstruther (soldier) (died 1583), Scottish soldier in the service of Mary, Queen of Scots

== Other uses ==
- Mr. Anstruther, a P. G. Wodehouse character; see List of Jeeves characters
- Anstruther railway station, a former station serving the town
- Anstruther Township, a former township in Ontario, Canada, now part of North Kawartha Township

== See also ==
- Anstruther Easter (Parliament of Scotland constituency), pre-1707
- Anstruther Wester (Parliament of Scotland constituency), pre-1707
