= List of Parliament of Scotland constituencies in 1707 =

List of constituencies in the Parliament of Scotland at the time of the Union is a list of the constituencies of the Parliament of Scotland (the Estates of Scotland) during the period shortly before the Union between the Kingdom of Scotland and the Kingdom of England. The unicameral Estates of Scotland existed from medieval times until 1707.

The Commissioners for the burghs (the "Third Estate") and shires and stewartries (sometimes called the "Fourth Estate", or classified as a subgroup within the "Second Estate") were elected, but on a very restrictive franchise. Commissioner was the title for ordinary, representative members of the parliament (junior peers were called Lords of Parliament; and senior peers, representatives of the monarch, and certain members of the clergy also sat in parliament).

The Scottish ministers (the Privy Council of Scotland), were not answerable to the Estates of Scotland but to the Scots monarch (which, after the Union of Crowns in 1603, usually meant de facto to the Privy Council of England, which had the opportunity to advise a king or queen resident in London). The Parliament of Scotland was abolished when it merged with the Parliament of England to create the new Parliament of Great Britain, in 1707 under the Acts of Union.

== Constituencies ==
The representation of the burghs and those of the shires and stewartries, by the time of the Union, consisted of 154 Commissioners elected from 99 constituencies.

An election was not held immediately after the Union because the establishment feared a possible landslide victory for the anti-Union Commissioners. Instead 45 Commissioners were hand-picked to represent the whole country (see Scottish representatives to the first Parliament of Great Britain) as the first MPs from Scotland. 43 of these hand-picked representatives were pro-Union.

From 1708, there were 45 single member constituencies of the Parliament of Great Britain. These constituencies remained unchanged until 1832. All the burghs were grouped into 4- or 5-member districts, apart from Edinburgh. Three pairs of shires were represented in alternate Parliaments.

The names given in the 'Shire or Stewartry' column in the list below were those for the shires and stewartries used in the Parliamentary returns for the Estates of Scotland which met on 6 May 1703, as reported in 1878 (this reporting date is important to note, as the names used are the anglicised ones introduced by the Victorians, and not the names given to the subdivisions of Scotland extant in 1703). In some cases the form of the name is unusual and not consistent with the version commonly accepted. In others the name changed after the Union.

The names used for UK constituencies are those used in The History of Parliament 1754–1790. These may not be exactly the same as those applied in the first half of the 18th century.

=== Scottish Burghs, Shires and Stewartries ===
| SP Constituency | Shire or Stewartry | Commissioners | Constituency after the union |
|---|---|---|---|
| Aberdeen | Aberdeenshire | 1 | Part of Aberdeen Burghs |
| Aberdeenshire | Aberdeenshire | 4 | Aberdeenshire |
| Annan | Dumfries & Annandale | 1 | Part of Dumfries Burghs |
| Anstruther Easter | Fifeshire | 1 | Part of Anstruther Easter Burghs |
| Anstruther Wester | Fifeshire | 1 | Part of Anstruther Easter Burghs |
| Arbroath | Forfarshire | 1 | Part of Aberdeen Burghs |
| Argyllshire | Argyllshire | 3 | Argyllshire |
| Ayr | Ayrshire | 1 | Part of Ayr Burghs |
| Ayrshire | Ayrshire | 3 | Ayrshire |
| Banff | Banffshire | 1 | Part of Elgin Burghs |
| Banffshire | Banffshire | 2 | Banffshire |
| Berwickshire | Berwickshire | 4 | Berwickshire |
| Brechin | Forfarshire | 1 | Part of Aberdeen Burghs |
| Burntisland | Fifeshire | 1 | Part of Dysart Burghs |
| Buteshire | Buteshire | 2 | Buteshire |
| Caithness-shire | Caithness-shire | 2 | Caithness |
| Campbeltown | Argyllshire | 1 | Part of Ayr Burghs |
| Clackmannanshire | Clackmannanshire | 1 | Clackmannanshire |
| Crail | Fifeshire | 1 | Part of Anstruther Easter Burghs |
| Cromartyshire | Cromartyshire | 2 | Cromartyshire |
| Cullen | Banffshire | 1 | Part of Elgin Burghs |
| Culross | Perthshire | 1 | Part of Stirling Burghs |
| Cupar | Fifeshire | 1 | Part of Perth Burghs |
| Dingwall | Ross-shire | 1 | Part of Tain Burghs |
| Dornoch | Sutherlandshire | 1 | Part of Tain Burghs |
| Dumbarton | Dunbartonshire | 1 | Part of Glasgow Burghs |
| Dumbartonshire | Dunbartonshire | 2 | Dunbartonshire |
| Dumfries | Dumfries & Annandale | 1 | Part of Dumfries Burghs |
| Dumfriesshire | Dumfries & Annandale | 4 | Dumfriesshire |
| Dunbar | Haddingtonshire | 1 | Part of Haddington Burghs |
| Dundee | Forfarshire | 1 | Part of Perth Burghs |
| Dunfermline | Fifeshire | 1 | Part of Stirling Burghs |
| Dysart | Fifeshire | 1 | Part of Dysart Burghs |
| Edinburgh | Edinburghshire | 2 | Edinburgh |
| Edinburghshire | Edinburghshire | 4 | Edinburghshire |
| Elgin | Elgin & Forresshire | 1 | Part of Elgin Burghs |
| Elgin & Forresshire | Elgin & Forresshire | 2 | Elginshire |
| Fifeshire | Fifeshire | 4 | Fifeshire |
| Forfar | Forfarshire | 1 | Part of Perth Burghs |
| Forfarshire | Forfarshire | 4 | Forfarshire |
| Forres | Elgin & Forresshire | 1 | Part of Inverness Burghs |
| Fortrose | Ross-shire | 1 | Part of Inverness Burghs |
| Glasgow | Lanarkshire | 1 | Part of Glasgow Burghs |
| Haddington | Haddingtonshire | 1 | Part of Haddington Burghs |
| Haddingtonshire | Haddingtonshire | 4 | Haddingtonshire |
| Inveraray | Argyllshire | 1 | Part of Ayr Burghs |
| Inverbervie | Kincardineshire | 1 | Part of Aberdeen Burghs |
| Inverkeithing | Fifeshire | 1 | Part of Stirling Burghs |
| Inverness | Inverness-shire | 1 | Part of Inverness Burghs |
| Inverness-shire | Inverness-shire | 2 | Inverness-shire |
| Inverurie | Aberdeenshire | 1 | Part of Elgin Burghs |
| Irvine | Ayrshire | 1 | Part of Ayr Burghs |
| Jedburgh | Roxburghshire | 1 | Part of Haddington Burghs |
| Kilrenny | Fifeshire | 1 | Part of Anstruther Easter Burghs |
| Kincardineshire | Kincardineshire | 2 | Kincardineshire |
| Kinghorn | Fifeshire | 1 | Part of Dysart Burghs |
| Kinross-shire | Kinross-shire | 1 | Kinross-shire |
| Kintore | Aberdeenshire | 1 | Part of Elgin Burghs |
| Kirkcaldy | Fifeshire | 1 | Part of Dysart Burghs |
| Kirkcudbright Burgh | Stewartry of Kirkcudbright | 1 | Part of Dumfries Burghs |
| Kirkcudbright Stewartry | Stewartry of Kirkcudbright | 2 | Kirkcudbright Stewartry |
| Kirkwall | Orkney | 1 | Part of Tain Burghs |
| Lanark | Lanarkshire | 1 | Part of Linlithgow Burghs |
| Lanarkshire | Lanarkshire | 4 | Lanarkshire |
| Lauder | Berwickshire | 1 | Part of Haddington Burghs |
| Linlithgow | Linlithgowshire | 1 | Part of Linlithgow Burghs |
| Linlithgowshire | Linlithgowshire | 2 | Linlithgowshire |
| Lochmaben | Dumfries & Annandale | 1 | Part of Dumfries Burghs |
| Montrose | Forfarshire | 1 | Part of Aberdeen Burghs |
| Nairn | Nairnshire | 1 | Part of Inverness Burghs |
| Nairnshire | Nairnshire | 2 | Nairnshire |
| New Galloway | Stewartry of Kirkcudbright | 1 | Part of Wigtown Burghs |
| North Berwick | Haddingtonshire | 1 | Part of Haddington Burghs |
| Orkney & Shetland | Orkney & Zetland | 2 | Orkney & Shetland |
| Peebles | Peeblesshire | 1 | Part of Linlithgow Burghs |
| Peeblesshire | Peeblesshire | 2 | Peeblesshire |
| Perth | Perthshire | 1 | Part of Perth Burghs |
| Perthshire | Perthshire | 4 | Perthshire |
| Pittenweem | Fifeshire | 1 | Part of Anstruther Easter Burghs |
| Queensferry | Linlithgowshire | 1 | Part of Stirling Burghs |
| Renfrew | Renfrewshire | 1 | Part of Glasgow Burghs |
| Renfrewshire | Renfrewshire | 3 | Renfrewshire |
| Ross-shire | Ross-shire | 2 | Ross-shire |
| Rothesay | Buteshire | 1 | Part of Ayr Burghs |
| Roxburghshire | Roxburghshire | 4 | Roxburghshire |
| Rutherglen | Lanarkshire | 1 | Part of Glasgow Burghs |
| St Andrews | Fifeshire | 1 | Part of Perth Burghs |
| Sanquhar | Dumfries & Annandale | 1 | Part of Dumfries Burghs |
| Selkirk | Selkirkshire | 1 | Part of Linlithgow Burghs |
| Selkirkshire | Selkirkshire | 2 | Selkirkshire |
| Stirling | Stirlingshire | 1 | Part of Stirling Burghs |
| Stirlingshire | Stirlingshire | 3 | Stirlingshire |
| Stranraer | Wigtownshire | 1 | Part of Wigtown Burghs |
| Sutherlandshire | Sutherlandshire | 1 | Sutherland |
| Tain | Ross-shire | 1 | Part of Tain Burghs |
| Whithorn | Wigtownshire | 1 | Part of Wigtown Burghs |
| Wick | Caithness-shire | 1 | Part of Tain Burghs |
| Wigtown | Wigtownshire | 1 | Part of Wigtown Burghs |
| Wigtownshire | Wigtownshire | 2 | Wigtownshire |

=== Analysis of Scottish constituencies, 1703 and 1708 ===
Key to categories in the following tables: BC - Burgh constituencies, SC - Shire and Stewartry constituencies, Total C - Total constituencies, BMP - Burgh Members of Parliament, SMP - Shire and Stewartry Members of Parliament.

Table 1: Constituencies and MPs, by type of constituency

| Year | BC | SC | Total C | BMP | SMP | Total MPs |
|---|---|---|---|---|---|---|
| 1703 | 66 | 33 | 99 | 67 | 87 | 154 |
| 1708 | 15 | 30 | 45 | 15 | 30 | 45 |

Table 1: Constituencies and MPs, by type and number of seats

| Year | BCx1 | BCx2 | SCx1 | SCx2 | SCx3 | SCx4 | Total C | Total MPs |
|---|---|---|---|---|---|---|---|---|
| 1703 | 65 | 1 | 3 | 16 | 4 | 10 | 99 | 154 |
| 1708 | 15 | 0 | 30 | 0 | 0 | 0 | 45 | 45 |

== See also ==
- List of UK Parliament constituencies in Scotland from 1707
- Parliament of Scotland
- 1st Parliament of Great Britain
- 2nd Parliament of Great Britain
- District of burghs (UK Parliament)
- Lord High Commissioner to the Parliament of Scotland
