= David Bethune =

David Bethune may refer to:

- David Beaton (c. 1494–1546), also Bethune, Scottish cardinal
- David Bethune of Balfour (1648–1708), Scottish landowner and politician
- David Bethune of Creich (c. 1605–1660), Scottish landowner and politician
