= Linlithgow (disambiguation) =

Linlithgow is a town in West Lothian, Scotland.

Linlithgow may also refer to:

- Linlithgow (Parliament of Scotland constituency), prior to 1707
- Linlithgow (Scottish Parliament constituency), 1999–2026
- Linlithgow (UK Parliament constituency)
- Linlithgow (ward)
- John Hope, 7th Earl of Hopetoun, later 1st Marquess of Linlithgow
- Victor Hope, 2nd Marquess of Linlithgow (1887–1952), British politician, statesman and colonial administrator, Governor-General and Viceroy of India from 1936 to 1943
