= Stranraer (Parliament of Scotland constituency) =

Stranraer in Wigtownshire was a royal burgh that returned one commissioner to the Parliament of Scotland and to the Convention of Estates.

After the Acts of Union 1707, Stranraer, New Galloway, Whithorn and Wigtown formed the Wigtown district of burghs, returning one member between them to the House of Commons of Great Britain.

== List of burgh commissioners ==
- 1685–86: Peter Paterson, provost
- 1689 (convention), 1689: John Dalrymple the younger of Stair (took public office, 1689)
- 1690–1701: Sir Patrick Murray
- 1702–07: George Dalrymple (son of Viscount Stair)

== See also ==
- List of constituencies in the Parliament of Scotland at the time of the Union
