= List of listed buildings in Elie, Fife =

This is a list of listed buildings in the parish of Elie in Fife, Scotland.

== List ==
| Name | Location | Date listed | Grid ref. (Note: Sometimes known as OSGB36, the grid reference (where provided) is based on the British national grid reference system used by the Ordnance Survey. • "Guide to National Grid". Ordnance Survey. • "Get-a-map". Ordnance Survey.) | Geo-coordinates | Notes | LB number (Note: Historic Environment Scotland assign a unique alphanumeric identifier to each designated site in Scotland, for listed buildings this always begins with "LB", for example "LB12345".) | Image |
|---|---|---|---|---|---|---|---|
| Elie Ness Lady's Tower | | | | 56°11′06″N 2°48′28″W | Category C(S) | 8999 | Upload another image |
| Elie House, Obelisk | | | | 56°11′37″N 2°48′50″W | Category B | 9013 | Upload another image |
| Elie Ness Lady's Tower. Vaulted Chamber | | | | 56°11′06″N 2°48′28″W | Category C(S) | 8998 | Upload Photo |
| Elie House, South Lodge and Gateway | | | | 56°11′31″N 2°48′53″W | Category B | 9010 | Upload another image |
| Elie House, Walled Garden | | | | 56°11′50″N 2°49′08″W | Category B | 9015 | Upload Photo |
| Grange House and Grange Cottage | | | | 56°11′29″N 2°50′36″W | Category B | 9017 | Upload Photo |
| Elie House, (former Convent of St Marie Reparatrice) | | | | 56°11′48″N 2°48′53″W | Category A | 9000 | Upload another image |
| Ardross Dovecot | | | | 56°11′49″N 2°47′42″W | Category B | 8996 | Upload another image |
| Elie House, West Lodge And Gateway | | | | 56°11′47″N 2°49′30″W | Category C(S) | 9011 | Upload Photo |
| Elie Ness Lighthouse | | | | 56°11′02″N 2°48′46″W | Category C(S) | 8997 | Upload another image |
| Elie House, Dovecote | | | | 56°11′50″N 2°49′02″W | Category B | 9012 | Upload Photo |
| Elie House, Steading And Sawmill | | | | 56°11′52″N 2°49′07″W | Category B | 9014 | Upload Photo |
| Beacon, East Vows, Elie Ness | | | | 56°10′51″N 2°50′09″W | Category B | 52567 | Upload another image |

== Key ==
The scheme for classifying buildings in Scotland is:

- Category A: "buildings of national or international importance, either architectural or historic; or fine, little-altered examples of some particular period, style or building type."
- Category B: "buildings of regional or more than local importance; or major examples of some particular period, style or building type, which may have been altered."
- Category C: "buildings of local importance; lesser examples of any period, style, or building type, as originally constructed or moderately altered; and simple traditional buildings which group well with other listed buildings."

In March 2016 there were 47,288 listed buildings in Scotland. Of these, 8% were Category A, and 50% were Category B, with the remaining 42% being Category C.

== See also ==
- List of listed buildings in Fife
