= Wigtown (Parliament of Scotland constituency) =

Wigtown was a royal burgh that returned one commissioner to the Parliament of Scotland and to the Convention of Estates.

After the Acts of Union 1707, Wigtown, New Galloway, Stranraer and Whithorn formed the Wigtown district of burghs, returning one member between them to the House of Commons of Great Britain.

== List of burgh commissioners ==
- 1661: Thomas Stewart
- 1662–63, 1665 convention: Adam McKie, provost
- 1667 convention: John McKie, town clerk
- 1669–72: William McKie
- 1673–74: William Cluiston
- 1678 convention: Patrick Stewart, bailie
- 1681–82, 1685–86, 1689 convention, 1689–1702, 1702-07: William Coltrane of Drummorrell, provost

== See also ==
- List of constituencies in the Parliament of Scotland at the time of the Union
