= Nathaniel Whetham =

English baker and politician

Member of the English Parliament for Portsmouth
- In office 1654–1656
- Preceded by: Not represented in Barebones Parliament
- Succeeded by: Thomas Smith

Personal details
- Born: 1604
- Died: 16 September 1668

Nathaniel Whetham (1604 – 16 September 1668) was an English baker and politician who sat in the House of Commons between 1654 and 1659. He fought in the Parliamentary army in the English Civil War.

Whetham was the son of Thomas Whetham and his wife Dorothy Hooper. He was baptised at Burstock on 25 November 1604. He was apprenticed in London to Edward Terrill, the baker to the Inner Temple. By 1632 he had completed his apprenticeship and was appointed steward to the court of the Worshipful Company of Bakers. He joined the "Company of the Plough" which had secured a patent from Sir Ferdinando Gorges on land in South-East Maine with the aim of emigrating there but the venture was unsuccessful and he continued his trade in the Company of Whitebakers.

When the Civil War broke out, Whetham joined the City of London militia and was appointed major of dragoons and a captain of one of their companies under colonel Richard Browne. Whetham and his dragoons were stationed near Aylesbury where his troops were restless and an attack on the Royalist garrison at Brill was abortive. However, he was appointed Governor of Northampton and for the next four to five years he held the town on behalf of Parliament. In October 1643 he repelled an advance by Prince Rupert and his twenty-two troops of horse and 700 men and then raided Royalist troops along Watling Street by night. In April 1644 he organised the rescue of over thirty parliamentary soldiers from Banbury Castle. In August 1644 he was described as 'Commander in chiefe' and 'valliant and faithfull' in the first siege of Banbury Castle. He remained at Northampton for most of the next three years and took part in the second siege of Banbury Castle.

In September 1649, Whetham was sent as Governor of Portsmouth to reinforce the port. His immediate priority was to repair the fortifications. He was also responsible for reorganising the armed forces, and setting up of a Hampshire Militia under his own command. He was also appointed a Justice of the Peace for Hampshire. In 1654, he was elected Member of Parliament for Portsmouth in the First Protectorate Parliament. At this time Whetman met and became friends with General George Monck who was based at Portsmouth and in 1655 went to Scotland with Monck as member of Monck's Council of State for Scotland. In 1656 he was elected MP for a Scottish constituency comprising the boroughs of St. Andrews, Dysart, Kirkaldy, Anstruther-East, Pittenween, Creel, Dumfermline, Kinghorn, Anstruther-West, Innerleithing, Kilkenny, and BurntIand for the Second Protectorate Parliament. He returned to Portsmouth in March 1657 wrote to the Committee of Safety saying that he had found affairs at Portsmouth very much under control. He was elected to sit on the Committee of Safety but does not appear to have attended any meetings. In 1659 he was re-elected MP for the Scottish constituency for the Third Protectorate Parliament. At this time he was caught up in the dispute between Parliament and the army when the army attempted to take Portsmouth which had been established as a parliamentary stronghold. He finished his term as governor of Portsmouth in 1659.

Whetham then joined General Monck who was advancing on London from the north. As a result of his contributions he was awarded a pension of £200 a year and hereditary entitlement to his lands as well as his own regiment. However, by the time of the Restoration his regiment had been handed over to Colonel Richard Norton and later King Charles II and Parliament agreed to annul the sale of church lands by which Whetham had bought the manor of Chard. He left his manorial home for a small tenancy on the estate and remained there until his death in 1668 at the age of about 64.

Whetham married Joanna Terrill, widow of his former master Edward Terrill.

Parliament of England
| Preceded by Not represented in Barebones Parliament | Member of Parliament for Portsmouth; 1654 | Succeeded by Thomas Smith |
