= Philip Anstruther (British Army officer) =

British Army officer

Lieutenant-General Philip Anstruther
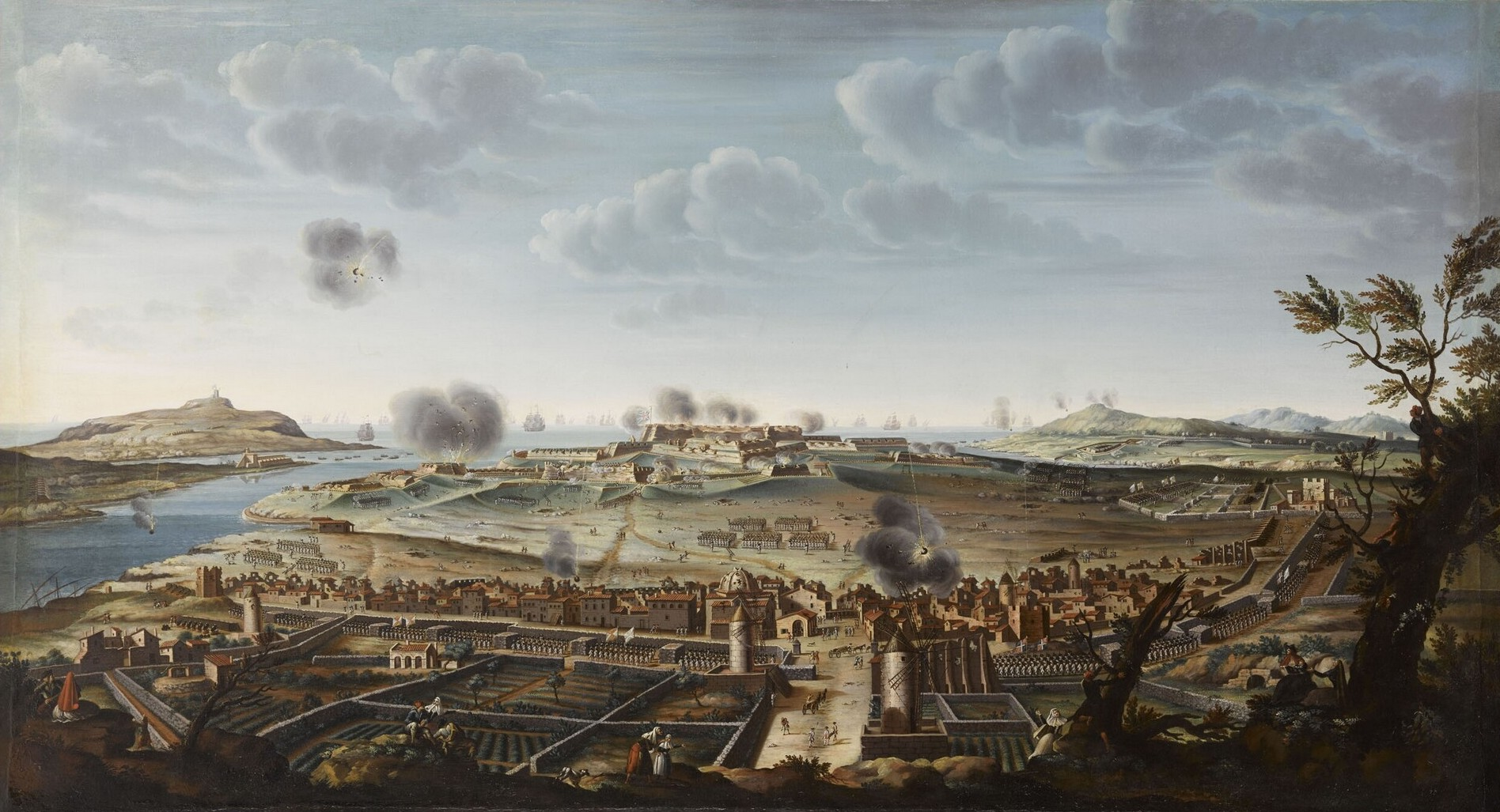
- Port Mahon, Menorca; an important British naval base, Anstruther's period as Lieutenant-Governor was marked by disputes and led to a Parliamentary investigation

Member of Parliament for Anstruther Burghs 1715 to 1722; 1722 to 1741
- In office 1747–1754

Lieutenant Governor of Menorca
- In office 1733–1747

Personal details
- Born: 1682 Airdrie House, Fife
- Died: 11 November 1760 (aged 80) Airdrie House, Fife
- Party: Whig
- Relations: Sir John Anstruther, 2nd Baronet
- Occupation: Soldier and politician

Military service
- Allegiance: Great Britain
- Branch/service: Army
- Rank: Lieutenant General 1745
- Unit: Colonel; 26th (Cameronian) Regiment of Foot 1720–1760

Lieutenant-General Philip Anstruther (bap. 26 July 1682 – 11 November 1760), of Airdrie House, Fife, was a professional soldier from Scotland and Member of Parliament between 1715 and 1754. He was a controversial Lieutenant Governor of Menorca.

== Personal details ==
Philip Anstruther was baptised at Edinburgh on 26 July 1682, only son of Sir James Anstruther of Airdrie House, in Fife, and his wife Katherine Skene; his father, a lawyer and Clerk of the Bills in the Parliament of Scotland, died the same year.

He died unmarried on 11 November 1760 and left his estate to his cousin, Sir John Anstruther, 2nd Baronet.

== Career ==
There are few details available on Anstruther's military career and it is not clear if he ever saw action. In 1710, he was appointed Captain in the Foot Guards, but these positions were based in London and often required little military service. In 1720, he purchased the colonelcy of the Cameronians, which he retained until his death. Regiments and commissions were then considered private assets and particularly at the senior levels did not require service.

The Anstruthers were an important family in Fife and his cousin Sir John controlled the constituency of Anstruther Burghs. At the 1715 British general election, Sir John was elected MP for Fife and Philip took over Anstruther Burghs, which he retained until defeated in 1741. His only recorded vote was in 1737, when he was the only Scottish MP to support government reprisals against Edinburgh over the Porteous Riots; although ultimately never passed, this allegedly made him "an object of detestation among his countrymen".

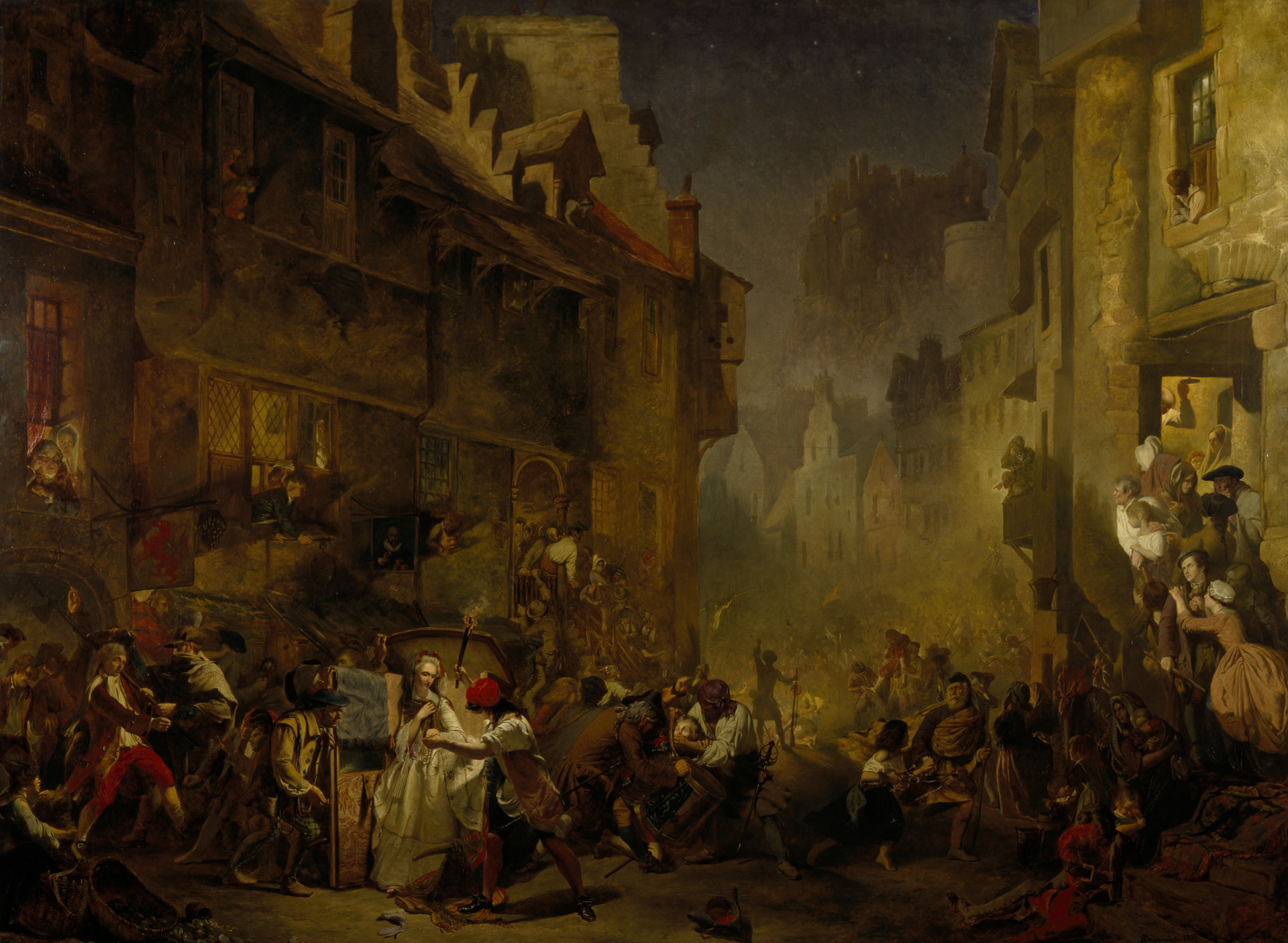
The Porteous Riots, by James Drummond; Anstruther was the only Scots MP to support proposed government reprisals

In 1733, Anstruther was appointed Lieutenant Governor of Menorca, an important British naval base in the Mediterranean Sea taken from Spain in 1708. Although he spent little time there, this was not unusual, but while many similar positions were accepted as sinecures, Menorca was vital for control of the Western Mediterranean, vulnerable to attack and absenteeism an ongoing problem. Following his defeat as an MP in 1741, Anstruther was summoned before a Parliamentary committee to explain his long absence from duty; although he admitted neglecting his duties, he narrowly escaped censure.

On returning to Menorca in 1742, Anstruther court-martialled his subordinate, Henry Erskine, for a supposed conspiracy against him; Erskine was acquitted and became a bitter political enemy. Since MPs were now barred from holding overseas military commands, Anstruther resigned as Lieutenant Governor and was returned for Anstruther Burghs at the 1747 British general election. However, much of his time was spent defending his activities at Menorca and he was heavily criticised in a Privy Council report. He was also attacked by Erskine, now in Parliament and seeking revenge; in the 1754 British general election, Erskine ran against him at Anstruther Burghs and won, ending his political career.

== Sources ==
- Dalton, Charles (1910). George the First's army; Volume I 1714-1727. Eyre and Spottiswoode.
- Guy, Alan (1985). Economy and Discipline: Officership and the British Army, 1714–63. Manchester University Press. ISBN 978-0-7190-1099-6.
- Maidment, James (1842). Scotish Elegiac Verses. Stevenson.
- RCAHMS (1933). Eleventh report with inventory of monuments and constructions in the counties of Fife, Kinross, and Clackmannan. RCAHMS. pp. 61–62.
- Simpson, JM; Lea, RS (1970). ANSTRUTHER, Philip (c.1680-1760), of Airdrie, Fife in The History of Parliament: the House of Commons 1715-1754. Boydell & Brewer.
- Wood, Walter (1887). The East Neuk of Fife: Its History and Antiquities. D. Douglas. pp. 403.

Parliament of the United Kingdom
Preceded by Sir John Anstruther, Bt	Member of Parliament for Anstruther Burghs; 1715–1741	Succeeded by John Stewart
Preceded by John Stewart	Member of Parliament for Anstruther Burghs; 1747–1754	Succeeded by Sir Henry Erskine, Bt
Military offices
Preceded by George Preston	Colonel of 26th (The Cameronian) Regiment of Foot; 1720–1760	Succeeded by Edward Sandford
