= George Bethune (politician) =

Scottish politician

George Bethune (c1635-), the last name pronounced and sometimes written as Beaton, was a Scottish soldier, businessman, and politician from Fife whose public career was curtailed by his Jacobitism.

== Origins ==
The son of John Bethune, 12th of Balfour, and his wife Catherine Haliburton, he was a younger brother of James Bethune (1620-1690), 13th of Balfour, and the uncle of David Bethune (1648-1708), 14th of Balfour.

== Career ==
In the Scots Army he served as a Lieutenant in The Blues under Colonel Sir William Lockhart of Lee and then went into business in the burgh of Kilrenny, where he was admitted as a burgess. In the Parliament of Scotland convened in 1689, he was elected for the constituency of Kilrenny, but was unseated on 25 April 1693 after failing to take the oath of loyalty to King William II and Queen Mary II. The date of his death has not been traced. Kilrenny was later represented by his great-nephew, James Bethune (1671-1719), 15th of Balfour.

== Family ==
No record of marriage or children has been found.
