= Whithorn (Parliament of Scotland constituency) =

Whithorn in Wigtownshire was a royal burgh that returned one commissioner to the Parliament of Scotland and to the Convention of Estates.

After the Acts of Union 1707, Whithorn, New Galloway, Stranraer and Wigtown formed the Wigtown district of burghs, returning one member between them to the House of Commons of Great Britain.

== List of burgh commissioners ==
- 1661: William Houston
- 1662–63: James McCullogh
- 1665 convention: Alexander Donaldson, provost
- 1667 convention: John McKie, town clerk
- 1669–1674: Alexander McCulloch of Dromorell
- 1678 convention: David Garoch, merchant-burgess
- 1681–82, 1685–86: David Forrester, merchant-burgess
- 1689 convention, 1689–1702: Patrick Murdoch of Camlodden
- 1702–1707: John Clerk of Penicuik

== See also ==
- List of constituencies in the Parliament of Scotland at the time of the Union
