= Irvine (Parliament of Scotland constituency) =

Constituency of the Parliament of Scotland

Irvine in Ayrshire was a royal burgh that returned one commissioner to the Parliament of Scotland and to the Convention of Estates.

After the Acts of Union 1707, Irvine, Ayr, Campbeltown, Inveraray and Rothesay formed the Ayr district of burghs, returning one member between them to the House of Commons of Great Britain.

== List of burgh commissioners ==
- 1579–87: Hugh Campbell
- 1648: Robert Brown
- 1649–51: Robert Barclay
- 1661: Alan Dunlop the younger of Craig, provost
- 1665 convention, 1667 convention, 1669: Robert Cunningham, provost (died c.1670)
- 1673–74: Arthur Hamilton, town clerk
- 1678 convention: John Montgomerie the younger of Bench, merchant-burgess
- 1685–86: George Leslie, baillie
- 1689 convention, 1689–1702: Alexander Cuninghame of Chirrislands
- 1702–05: Alexander Cunynghame of Collellan (died c.1705)
- 1705–07: George Monro, baillie

== See also ==
- List of constituencies in the Parliament of Scotland at the time of the Union
