= Selkirk (Parliament of Scotland constituency) =

Constituency of the Old Parliament of Scotland

Selkirk was a royal burgh that returned one commissioner to the Parliament of Scotland and to the Convention of Estates.

After the Acts of Union 1707, Selkirk, Lanark, Linlithgow and Peebles formed the Lanark district of burghs, returning one member between them to the House of Commons of Great Britain.

== List of burgh commissioners ==
- 1661: Robert Elliot, bailie
- 1665 convention, 1667 convention: William Michilhill, bailie
- 1669–74: Patrick Murray
- 1678 convention, 1685–86: William Wauch, bailie
- 1681–82: Andro Angus, town clerk
- 1689 convention, 1689–1702: John Murray
- 1702–07: Robert Scott

== See also ==
- List of constituencies in the Parliament of Scotland at the time of the Union
