= Sir Henry Erskine, 5th Baronet =

Scottish soldier and politician

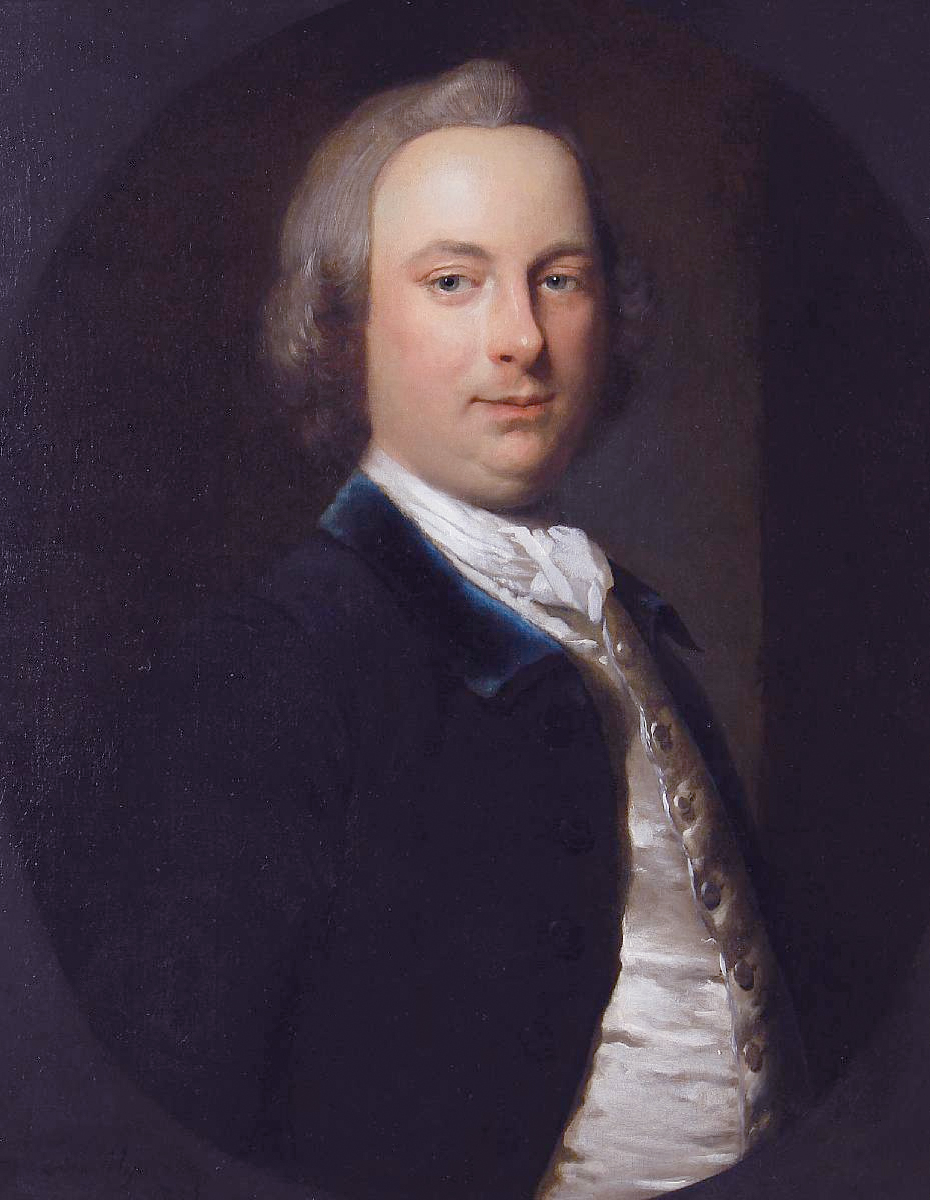
Henry Erskine, 5th Baronet, father of James, second Earl of Rosslyn (Frans van der Mijn)

Sir Henry Erskine, 5th Baronet (23 Dec 1710 – 7 August 1765) was a Scottish soldier and politician.

He was a younger son of Sir John Erskine, 3rd Baronet, M.P. of Alva, Clackmannanshire, and Catherine Sinclair, was probably educated at Eton College and entered Lincoln's Inn to study law in 1728. However, instead of a legal career he joined the Army and rose to the rank of Lieutenant-General in 1765.

He succeeded to the baronetcy and family estate when his elder brother Charles was killed in action at the Battle of Lauffeld in 1747. Erskine then served as Member of Parliament (MP) for Ayr Burghs 1749–1754 and for Anstruther Easter Burghs 1754–1765.

He died in 1765. He had married Janet, the daughter of Peter Wedderburn, Lord Chesterhall, and with her had two sons and a daughter. He was succeeded by his eldest son James, who later became the 2nd Earl of Rosslyn.

Parliament of Great Britain
Preceded by Charles Erskine	Member of Parliament for Ayr Burghs; 1749–1754	Succeeded by James Stuart-Mackenzie
Preceded by Philip Anstruther	Member of Parliament for Anstruther-Easter Burghs; 1754–1765	Succeeded by Sir John Anstruther, Bt
Military offices
Preceded by Lord Frederick Cavendish	Colonel of the 67th Regiment of Foot; 1760–1761	Succeeded by Hamilton Lambert
Preceded by The Earl of Home	Colonel of the 25th (Edinburgh) Regiment of Foot; 1761–1762	Succeeded by Lord George Henry Lennox
Preceded by Hon. James St Clair	Colonel of the 1st (Royal) Regiment of Foot; 1762–1765	Succeeded by Marquess of Lorne
Court offices
Preceded by John Offley	Surveyor of the King's Private Roads; 1757–1760	Succeeded by Hon. Edward Finch
Baronetage of Nova Scotia
Preceded by Charles Erskine	Baronet (of Alva); 1747–1765	Succeeded by James Erskine
