= Kilrenny (Parliament of Scotland constituency) =

Constituency of the Old Parliament of Scotland

Kilrenny in Fife was a royal burgh that returned one commissioner to the Parliament of Scotland and to the Convention of Estates.

After the Acts of Union 1707, Kilrenny, Anstruther Easter, Anstruther Wester, Crail and Pittenweem formed the Anstruther Easter district of burghs, returning one member between them to the House of Commons of Great Britain.

== List of burgh commissioners ==
- 1669–72: Captain Gideon Murray, merchant-burgess
- 1672: Kilrenny renounced rights to representation but later allowed to continue
- 1689 convention, 1689–93: George Bethune (or Beaton), younger son of the 12th laird of Balfour and a trader in the burgh, expelled 1693 for absence after refusing oath of allegiance.
- 1693–1701: Alexander Stevenson
- 1702–07: James Bethune, eldest son of the 14th laird of Balfour, voted against the union.

== See also ==
- List of constituencies in the Parliament of Scotland at the time of the Union
