= Elie House =

Country house in Elie, Scotland

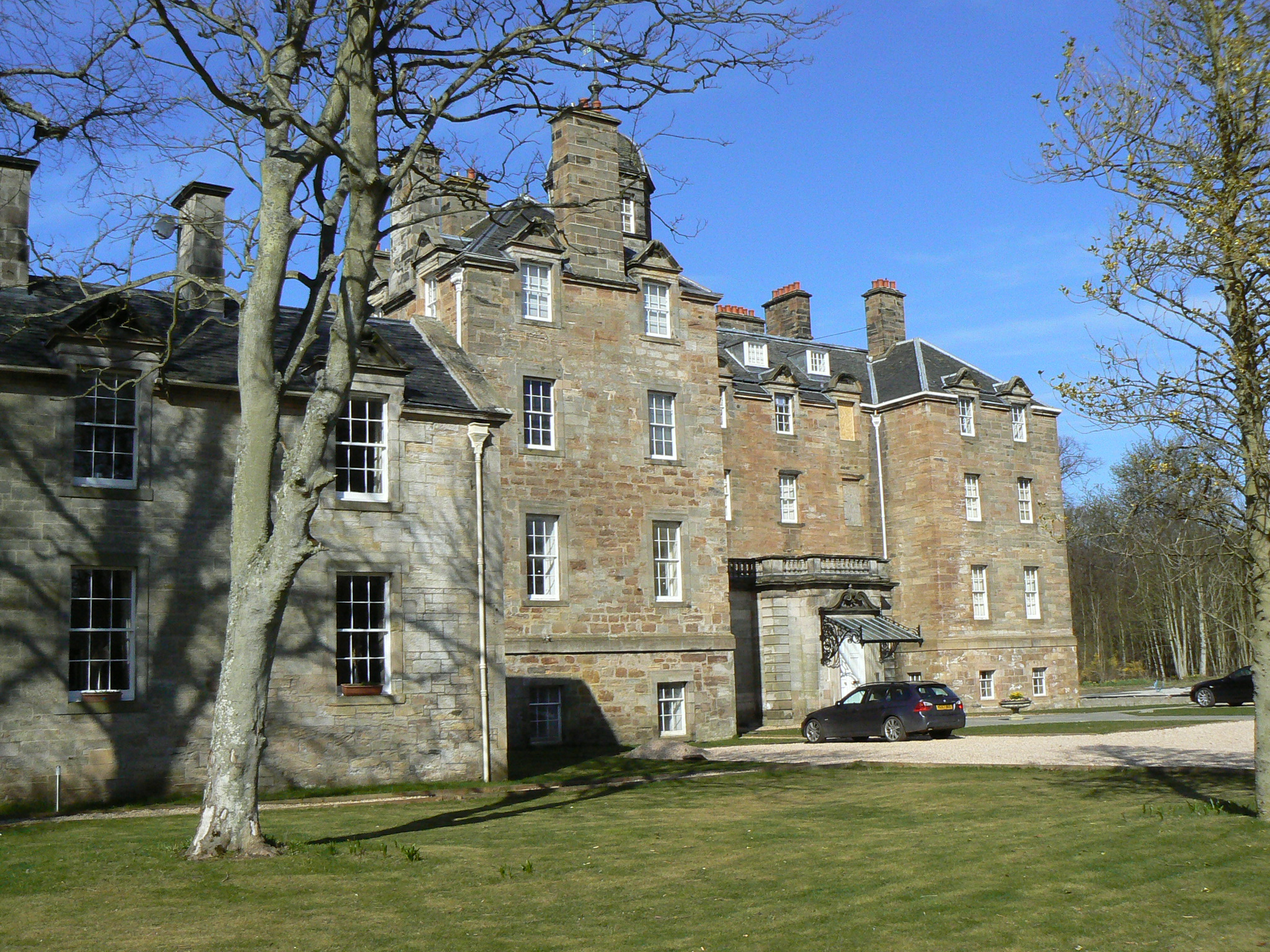

General information
- Type: Country House
- Location: Elie, Fife, Scotland
- Coordinates: 56.19708°N 2.8139°W
- Completed: 1697

Design and construction
- Designations: Category A listed

Elie House is a country house in Elie, Fife, Scotland. It is a Category A listed building.

The house, built in 1697 and incorporating an earlier structure, is south facing, constructed in stone in 3 storeys, 2 bays deep with a 5-bay frontage. Later additions were made c.1770 and in 1854–55.

== History ==
Elie House was built for judge Sir William Anstruther, Lord Anstruther, S.C.J.

The house passed to Sir William's only son, Sir John Anstruther, 1st Baronet, of Anstruther, His son Sir John Anstruther, 2nd Baronet, of Anstruther made a major addition to Elie House and carried out a landscaping scheme in about 1771 which involved the building of a surviving summerhouse known as the Lady's Tower. He also ordered the clearance of a hamlet called Balclevie to improve the view, which, according to local legend, caused the building to be cursed by one of the uprooted victims.

The house descended in the Anstruther, later Carmichael-Anstruther, family until it was sold in 1853 to the industrialist William Baird by the financially insolvent 7th baronet. Baird carried out the 1855 modifications, reconstructing the east side of the house and adding a tower. In 1928 his descendents sold it to Sir Michael Nairn, 2nd Baronet.

In the 1950s the house was sold to the Marie Reparatrice order of nuns who commissioned Peter Whiston in 1958 to build them a large chapel. In 2000, Elie was sold to a property developer who in 2012 converted the buildings into 13 apartments. The remainder of the Elie estate now belongs to the Trustees of the Elie Estate Trust under the stewardship of the Nairn family.
