= Lanark (Parliament of Scotland constituency) =

Constituency of the Old Parliament of Scotland

Lanark was a royal burgh that returned one commissioner to the Parliament of Scotland and to the Convention of Estates.

After the Acts of Union 1707, Lanark, Linlithgow, Peebles and Selkirk formed the Lanark district of burghs, returning one member between them to the House of Commons of Great Britain.

== List of burgh commissioners ==
- 1661–63, 1665 convention, 1667 convention, 1669–74: Patrick Bissett, bailie
- 1678 convention: Thomas Stoddart
- 1681–82: William Wilkie, commissar, bailie
- 1685: James Weir, merchant
- 1686: James Hair
- 1689 convention, 1689–1702: Thomas Hamilton, bailie
- 1702–07: William Carmichaell, advocate

== See also ==
- List of constituencies in the Parliament of Scotland at the time of the Union
