= Robert Anstruther (MP) =

Colonel Robert Anstruther (31 December 1757 – 1832) was a Scottish soldier in the British Army, and briefly a politician.

He was the son of Sir John Anstruther of that Ilk, 2nd Bt. and Janet Fall. He married Anne Nairne, daughter of Colonel Alexander Nairne and Preston née Balneavis on 9 May 1801.

He was the Member of Parliament (MP) for Anstruther Burghs from 1793 to 1794. He gained the rank of Colonel in the service of the 68th Regiment.

Parliament of Great Britain
| Preceded by Sir John Anstruther, 2nd Bt | Member of Parliament for Anstruther Burghs; 1793–1794 | Succeeded by William Dundas |
