= Rothesay (Parliament of Scotland constituency) =

Parliament of Scotland constituency

Rothesay in Buteshire was a royal burgh that returned one commissioner to the Parliament of Scotland and to the Convention of Estates.

After the Acts of Union 1707, Rothesay, Ayr, Campbeltown, Inveraray, and Irvine formed the Ayr district of burghs, returning one member between them to the House of Commons of Great Britain.

== List of burgh commissioners ==
- 1661: Adam Stewart
- 1665 convention, 1667 convention: no representation
- 1669–74: John Stewart of Askoge, advocate
- 1678 convention: Robert Stuart
- 1681–82, 1685–86: Cuthbert Stuart, provost
- 1689 convention, 1689–93: Robert Stewart of Tillicoultry, advocate
- 1693–1701: Robert Stewart, writer in Edinburgh
- 1702–07: Dougald Stewart of Blairhall

== See also ==
- List of constituencies in the Parliament of Scotland at the time of the Union
