= Ayr (Parliament of Scotland constituency) =

Constituency of the Old Parliament of Scotland in South Ayrshire, Scotland

Ayr was a royal burgh that returned one commissioner to the Parliament of Scotland and to the Convention of Estates.

After the Acts of Union 1707, Ayr, Campbeltown, Inveraray, Irvine and Rothesay formed the Ayr district of burghs, returning one member between them to the House of Commons of Great Britain.

== List of burgh commissioners ==
- 1567, 1575, 1578, 1579: John Lockhart of Barr
- 1604, 1605, 1607, 1609, 1612: John Lockhart of Barr
- 1644: John Osbourn
- 1645–47, 1648, 1649: John Kennedy
- 1649, 1650–51: Hew Kennedy
- 1661–63, 1665 convention, 1667 convention, 1669–74: William Cunningham, provost
- 1678 convention: Robert Doock, provost
- 1681–82: James Boyll, provost
- 1685–86: Robert Hunter, provost
- 1689 (convention), 1689–1702, 1703–07: John Moore, provost

== See also ==
- List of constituencies in the Parliament of Scotland at the time of the Union
