= Peebles (Parliament of Scotland constituency) =

Constituency of the Old Parliament of Scotland in Scottish Borders, Scotland

Peebles was a royal burgh that returned one commissioner to the Parliament of Scotland and to the Convention of Estates.

After the Acts of Union 1707, Peebles, Lanark, Linlithgow and Selkirk formed the Lanark district of burghs, returning one member between them to the House of Commons of Great Britain.

== List of burgh commissioners ==
- 1661–83, 1665 convention, 1667 convention: Alexander Williamson, provost
- 1669–70: John Plenderleith
- 1672–74: Alexander Williamson
- 1681–82: William Williamson, town clerk
- 1678: Gawin Thompson, provost
- 1689–1702: John Muir, merchant burgess
- 1702–07: Archibald Shiells, provost

== See also ==
- List of constituencies in the Parliament of Scotland at the time of the Union
