= Inveraray (Parliament of Scotland constituency) =

Constituency of the Old Parliament of Scotland in Argyll and Bute, Scotland

Inveraray in Argyllshire was a royal burgh that returned one commissioner to the Parliament of Scotland and to the Convention of Estates.

After the Acts of Union 1707, Inveraray, Ayr, Campbeltown, Irvine and Rothesay formed the Ayr district of burghs, returning one member between them to the House of Commons of Great Britain.

== List of burgh commissioners ==
- 1661–63: John Yuill, provost
- 1669–74: Sir Colin Campbell of Aberuchill
- 1678 (convention), 1681–82: William Broun, provost
- 1685–86: John McNaughton, councillor
- 1689 (convention), 1689–1702: Hugh Broune
- 1702–07: Daniel (or Donald) Campbell of Ardintenie

== See also ==
- List of constituencies in the Parliament of Scotland at the time of the Union
