= Philip Anstruther-Paterson =

Scottish politician

Sir Philip Anstruther-Paterson, 3rd Baronet (born Anstruther; 13 January 1752 – 5 January 1808) was a Scottish politician.

He served as Member of Parliament for Anstruther Burghs from 1774 to 1777. In 1778 he married Anne Paterson, daughter of Sir John Paterson, 3rd Baronet and Anne Hume-Campbell, Baroness Polwarth, but they had no children. In 1782 he changed his name to Anstruther-Paterson. He was a lieutenant in the 1st Dragoon Guards.

He succeeded his father as a baronet in the Baronetage of Nova Scotia on 4 July 1799. Sir Philip died sine prole. Lady Anstruther-Paterson died in 1818, her claim to inherit the title of Baroness Polwarth still unresolved.

Parliament of Great Britain
Preceded by Sir John Anstruther, Bt	Member of Parliament for Anstruther Burghs; 1774–1777	Succeeded by Viscount Milton
Baronetage of Nova Scotia
Preceded by John Anstruther	Baronet (of Anstruther); 1799–1808	Succeeded by John Anstruther
