= Anstruther Burghs =

Parliamentary constituency in the United Kingdom, 1801–1832

- Former burgh constituency for the House of Commons
- Subdivision: County of Fife
- Major settlements: Anstruther Easter, Anstruther Wester, Pittenweem, Crail, Kilrenny

1708–1832
- Seats: 1
- Created from: Anstruther Easter, Anstruther Wester, Crail, Kilrenny, Pittenweem
- Replaced by: St Andrews Burghs

Anstruther Burghs was a district of burghs constituency of the House of Commons of the Parliament of Great Britain from 1708 to 1800 and of the House of Commons of the Parliament of the United Kingdom from 1801 to 1832.

It elected one Member of Parliament (MP).

== Creation ==
The British parliamentary constituency was created in 1708 following the Acts of Union 1707 and replaced the former Parliament of Scotland burgh constituencies of Anstruther Easter, Anstruther Wester, Crail, Kilrenny and Pittenweem.

== Boundaries ==
The constituency comprised the burghs of Anstruther Easter, Anstruther Wester, Pittenweem, Crail, and Kilrenny, in the county of Fife.

In 1832, the burghs were combined with the Fife burghs of Cupar and St Andrews, which were previously components of Perth Burghs, to form St Andrews Burghs.

== Members of Parliament ==
Election	Member	Party	Notes
1708	Sir John Anstruther, 1st Bt		
1712	George Hamilton		
1713	Sir John Anstruther, 1st Bt		
1715	Philip Anstruther		
1741	John Stewart		
1747	Philip Anstruther I		Lieutenant-governor of Menorca 1742–1743
1754	Sir Henry Erskine, 5th Bt		
1766 by-election	Sir John Anstruther, 2nd Bt		
1774	Philip Anstruther II		Later 3rd Baronet
1778 by-election	Hon. George Damer		Chief Secretary for Ireland 1794–1795
1780	Sir John Anstruther, 2nd Bt		
1783 by-election	John Anstruther		
1790	Sir John Anstruther, 2nd Bt		
1793 by-election	Robert Anstruther		
1794 by-election	William Dundas		
1796	John Anstruther	Whig	MP for Cockermouth 1790–1796
1797 by-election	Alexander Campbell		
1806	Sir John Anstruther, 4th Bt		
1811 by-election	John Anstruther		
Feb 1818 by-election	Alexander Maconochie		previously MP for Yarmouth, Isle of Wight
1819 by-election	Sir William Rae, 3rd Bt	Tory	later MP for Harwich, Buteshire and Portarlington
1826	James Balfour	Tory	
1831	Andrew Johnston	Whig	afterwards MP for St Andrews Burghs
1832	constituency abolished. See St Andrews Burghs		

== Election results ==
=== Elections in the 1830s ===
General election 1831: Anstruther Burghs
Party	Candidate	Votes	%
Whig	Andrew Johnston	Unopposed	
Registered electors		c. 92	
Whig gain from Tory			

General election 1830: Anstruther Burghs
Party	Candidate	Votes	%	±%
Tory	James Balfour	3	75.0	
Non Partisan	Robert Bullock Marsham	1	25.0	
Majority		2	50.0	
Turnout		4	c. 4.3	
Registered electors		c. 92		
Tory hold		Swing		

== Sources ==
- Leigh Rayment's Historical List of MPs – Constituencies beginning with "A" (part 2)
