= David Bethune of Creich =

Scottish landowner and politician

David Bethune, 8th of Creich (c.1605–1660), his family name pronounced and sometimes written Beaton, was a Scottish landowner and politician from Fife.

== Origins ==
Born about 1605, possibly at the family castle of Creich, he was the eldest surviving son of David Bethune, 7th of Creich, (c1578-1628) and his wife Eupham Forbes (c1578-1624), daughter of Arthur Forbes, 6th of Rires. His sister Ann Bethune became the first wife of Sir John Moncreiff, 1st Baronet, while his sister Elizabeth Bethune married first William Fullarton of Fullarton and secondly Alexander Erskine, 11th of Dun.

== Career ==
About 1628 he inherited his father's lands and was later elected as a Shire Commissioner to the Parliament of Scotland for the constituency of Fife in the Parliaments of 1644–1647 and 1648–1651, being appointed in both cases to the Committee for War. In 1657 and in 1659 he was in financial disputes, the first with Patrick Fyfe, merchant in Edinburgh, and the second with Alexander Haliburton, merchant in Dundee. He died on 4 March 1660 at Dunbog, leaving no children. His heir was his younger brother, William Bethune, 9th of Creich.

== Family ==
Around 1630 he married Eupham Graham, who died without surviving children. On 31 December 1639 he married Margaret Cunningham, daughter of William Cunningham, 8th Earl of Glencairn. They had no children, and she married again to John Chisholm of Cromlix.
