= Fife (Parliament of Scotland constituency) =

Pre-union Parliament of Scotland constituency

Before the Acts of Union 1707, the barons of the shire of Fife elected commissioners to represent them in the Parliament of Scotland and in the Convention of the Estates. The number of commissioners was increased from two to four in 1690.

After 1708, Fife was represented by one Member of Parliament in the British House of Commons at Westminster.

== List of shire commissioners ==
- 1593: Myreton of Cambo
- 1600: Kynynmound of Craigie Hall
- 1607, 1608, 1609: Sir Andrew Murray of Balvaird

Parliament or Convention	Commissioners	
1612 Parliament	Sir David Carnegie of Kinnaird	Sir John Learmonth of Balcomie
1617 Convention	Sir John Wemyss of Wemyss	Sir James Wemyss of Bogie
1617 Parliament	Sir John Wemyss of Wemyss	Sir William Sandilands of St Monans
1621 Parliament	David Beaton of Balfour	John Leslie of Newtown
1625 Convention	Sir James Learmonth of Balcomie	Patrick Wardlaw of Torry
1630 Convention	Robert Forbes of Rires	
1633 Parliament	Sir John Leslie of Newtown	Thomas Myreton of Cambo
1639–41 Parliament	Sir Thomas Myreton of Cambo	William Rigg of Aithernie
1643–44 Convention	Sir Michael Balfour of Denmilne	Arthur Erskine of Scotscraig
1643–44 Convention	Sir Michael Balfour of Denmilne	Sir John Wemyss of Bogie (from 10 April 1644)
1644–47 Parliament	David Bethune of Creich	Sir John Aytoun of Aytoun
1644–47 Parliament	Arthur Erskine of Scotscraig (from 7 January 1645)	Robert Meldrum of Burleigh (from 7 January 1645)
1644–47 Parliament	David Bethune of Creich (from 26 November 1645)	Sir John Wemyss of Bogie (from 26 November 1645)
1648–51 Parliament	Arthur Erskine of Scotscraig	William Scott of Ardross
1648–51 Parliament	Arthur Erskine of Scotscraig	Sir James Halkett of Pitfirrane (from 4 January 1649)
1648–51 Parliament	George Hay of Naughton (from 7 March 1650)	David Wemyss of Fingask (from 7 March 1650)

During the Commonwealth of England, Scotland and Ireland, the sheriffdoms of Fife and Kinross were jointly represented by one Member of Parliament in the Protectorate Parliament at Westminster. After the Restoration, the Parliament of Scotland was again summoned to meet in Edinburgh.

Parliament or Convention	Commissioners				
1661–63 Parliament	William Scott of Ardross		Sir Alexander Gibson of Durie (died 6 August 1661)		
1661–63 Parliament	William Scott of Ardross		Sir Henry Wardlaw of Pitreavie (from 8 May 1662)		
1665 Convention	Sir Philip Anstruther of that Ilk		Andrew Bruce of Earlshall		
1667 Convention	Sir Philip Anstruther of that Ilk		Andrew Bruce of Earlshall		
1669–74 Parliament	Sir William Bruce of Balcaskie		Sir John Wemyss of Bogie		
1678 Convention	John Drummond of Lundin		Sir Philip Anstruther of that Ilk		
1681 Parliament	Sir Charles Halkett of Pitfirrane		William Anstruther, younger, of that Ilk		
1685–86 Parliament	Sir David Balfour of Forret		Sir Thomas Stewart of Balcaskie		
1689 Convention	William Anstruther, younger, of that Ilk		John Dempster of Pitliver		
1689–1702 Parliament	William Anstruther, younger, of that Ilk		John Dempster of Pitliver		
1689–1702 Parliament	By Act of Parliament 14 June 1690, the shire of Fife was allocated two additional Commissioners.				
1689–1702 Parliament	Sir William Anstruther of that Ilk	Sir John Dempster of Pitliver	James Melville of Halhill	George Moncrieff of Reidie	John Bethune of Craigfoodie
1703–07 Parliament	Sir William Anstruther of that Ilk	Henry Balfour of Dunbog	David Bethune of Balfour	Sir Patrick Murray of Pitdunnes (died in office)	John Bethune of Craigfoodie
1703–07 Parliament	Sir William Anstruther of that Ilk	Henry Balfour of Dunbog	David Bethune of Balfour	Robert Douglas of Strathendrie (from 1703; died in office)	
1703–07 Parliament	Sir William Anstruther of that Ilk	Henry Balfour of Dunbog	David Bethune of Balfour	Sir Archibald Hope of Rankeillour (from 25 April 1706; died 10 October 1706)	
1703–07 Parliament	Sir William Anstruther of that Ilk	Henry Balfour of Dunbog	David Bethune of Balfour	Thomas Hope of Rankeillour	
