= Henry Balfour (politician) =

Scottish politician

Major Hon. Henry Balfour of Dunbog (died circa 1730) was a Scottish politician who was Shire Commissioner for Fifeshire in the Parliament of Scotland prior to the Acts of Union 1707.

Balfour was the third son of John Balfour, 3rd Lord Balfour of Burleigh, and Isabel Balfour, daughter of Sir William Balfour of Pitcullo.

He was appointed captain in the state's service in 1683, captain in John Wauchope's Scots Foot in 1688, and captain of the Scots Greys in 1689. He gained the rank of Major in the service of the Dragoons.

He was one of the representatives of Fife in the last Parliament of Scotland, in which he opposed the Treaty of Union. The last Scottish Parliament was originally summoned to meet at Edinburgh on 12 November 1702, but was prorogued until 6 May 1703. This Parliament then consisted on four distinct sessions – (1) 6 May 1703 – 16 September 1703; (2) 6 July 1704 – 28 August 1704; (3) 28 June 1705 – 21 September 1705; and (4) 3 October 1706 – 25 March 1707. Major Henry Balfour of Dunbog was one of the members for Fifeshire in each of these four sessions.

In March 1691, he married Elizabeth Oliphant. They had one son, Henry Balfour of Dunbog (1708–1764), who married Katherine Porterfield.
