= Stirlingshire (Parliament of Scotland constituency) =

Before the Acts of Union 1707, the barons of the shire of Stirling elected commissioners to represent them in the unicameral Parliament of Scotland and in the Convention of the Estates.

From 1708 Stirlingshire was represented by one Member of Parliament in the House of Commons of Great Britain.

== List of shire commissioners ==
- 1612: Alexander Seton of Kilcreuch
- 1644: Sir Thomas Nicolson of Carnock
- 1648: Laird of Polmala (Murray)
- 1648: Laird of Garden (Stirling)
- 1649: Sir James Hope of Keir
- 1649–50: Sir James Hope of Hopton
- 1649–50: George Buchanan of that Ilk
- 1650: Sir Charles Erskine
- 1661–63: John Murray of Touchedame and Polmais
- 1661: James Livingstone, 1st Viscount Kilsyth (died 1661)
- 1662–63: John Buchanan of that Ilk
- 1665 convention: William Murray of Donypace
- 1665 convention, 1667 convention, 1669–72: James Seton the elder of Touch
- 1667 convention: Charles Erskine of Alvey
- 1669–74, 1678 (convention): Sir John Stirling of Keir
- 1674, 1678 (convention), 1681–82, 1685–86: James Seton the younger of Touch
- 1681–82: Richard Elphinstone of Airth
- 1685–86: William Livingstone of Kilsyth
- 1689 convention, 1689–90: Sir Charles Erskine of Alva (died 1690)
- 1689 convention, 1689–1701: Sir John Houston of that Ilk
- 1690–1701: Alexander Monro of Bearcrofts
- 1690–1700: Alexander Napier of Culcreuch (expelled 1700)
- 1700-1701: Sir John Schaw, Bt of Greenock (terminated 1701–2)
- 1702: William Livingstone of Kilsyth
- 1702–1707: John Grahame of Killearne
- 1702–1707: James Grahame of Buchlyvie
- 1702–1707: Robert Rollo of Powhouse

== See also ==
- List of constituencies in the Parliament of Scotland at the time of the Union
