= Crail (Parliament of Scotland constituency) =

Former Parliament of Scotland constituency

Crail in Fife was a royal burgh that returned one commissioner to the Parliament of Scotland and to the Convention of Estates.

After the Acts of Union 1707, Crail, Anstruther Easter, Anstruther Wester, Kilrenny and Pittenweem formed the Anstruther Easter district of burghs, returning one member between them to the House of Commons of Great Britain.

== List of burgh commissioners ==
- 1661–63: James Moncreiff, bailie
- 1665 convention, 1667 convention: John Daw, bailie
- 1678 convention, 1681–82: George Moncrieff, portioner of Sauchop, bailie
- 1685–86: John Preston
- 1689 convention, 1689–1701, 1702–07: George Moncrieff of Sanchope

== See also ==
- List of constituencies in the Parliament of Scotland at the time of the Union
