= Lanark Burghs (UK Parliament constituency) =

Parliamentary constituency in the United Kingdom, 1801–1832

Coordinates: 55.674°N 3.782°W

- Former district of burghs constituency for the House of Commons
- Major settlements: Linlithgow in the county of Linlithgow, Lanark, Peebles, Selkirk

1708–1832
- Seats: One
- Created from: Lanark, Linlithgow, Peebles, Selkirk

Lanark Burghs (also known as Linlithgow Burghs) was a district of burghs constituency of the House of Commons of Great Britain from 1708 and the House of Commons of the Parliament of the United Kingdom (at Westminster) from 1801 to 1832, representing a seat for one Member of Parliament (MP).

There was also a later Lanark county constituency, from 1918 to 1983.

== Creation ==
The British parliamentary constituency was created in 1708 following the Acts of Union, 1707 and replaced the former Parliament of Scotland burgh constituencies of Linlithgow, Lanark, Peebles and Selkirk.

== Boundaries ==
The constituency covered four burghs: Linlithgow in the county of Linlithgow, Lanark in the county of Lanark, Peebles in the county of Peebles, and Selkirk in the county of Selkirk.

== History ==
The constituency elected one Member of Parliament (MP) by the first past the post system until the seat was abolished for the 1832 general election.

For the 1832 general election, as a result of the Representation of the People (Scotland) Act 1832, Peebles was merged into the county constituency of Peeblesshire, Selkirk was merged into the county constituency of Selkirkshire, and the remaining burghs were combined with Airdrie and Hamilton, both in the county of Lanark, to form Falkirk Burghs. At the same time, however, the boundaries of burghs for parliamentary election purposes ceased be necessarily those for other purposes.

== Members of Parliament ==
Election	Member	Party
1708	Hon. George Douglas	
1713	Sir James Carmichael, Bt	
1715	Hon. George Douglas	
1722	Daniel Weir	
1725 by-election	John Murray	
1734	James Carmichael	
1742	John Mackye	
1747	Lawrence Dundas	
1748	James Carmichael	
1754	John Murray	
1761	John Lockhart-Ross	
1768 by-election	James Dickson	
1772 by-election	Sir James Cockburn, Bt	
1784	Sir John Moore	
1790	William Grieve	
1796	Viscount Stopford	
1802	William Dickson	
1806	Sir Charles Lockhart-Ross, Bt	
1807	William Maxwell	
1812	Sir John Buchanan Riddell, Bt	
1819 by-election	John Pringle	
1820	Henry Monteith	Tory
1826	Adam Hay	Tory
1830	Henry Monteith	Tory
1831	William Downe Gillon	Whig
1832	constituency abolished	

=== Elections in the 1830s ===
General election 1831: Lanark Burghs
Party	Candidate	Votes	%	±%
Whig	William Downe Gillon	3	75.0	
	James Johnstone	1	25.0	
Majority		2	50.0	
Turnout		4		

General election 1830: Lanark Burghs
Party	Candidate	Votes	%	±%
Tory	Henry Monteith	3	75.0	
Whig	William Downe Gillon	1	25.0	
Majority		2	50.0	
Turnout		4		
Tory hold		Swing		

=== Elections in the 1820s ===
General election 1826: Lanark Burghs
Party	Candidate	Votes	%	±%
Tory	Adam Hay	3	75.0	
Tory	Henry Monteith	1	25.0	
Majority		2	50.0	
Turnout		4		

General election 1820: Lanark Burghs
Party	Candidate	Votes	%	±%
Tory	Henry Monteith	3	75.0	
Independent socialist	Robert Owen	1	25.0	
Majority		2	50.0	
Turnout		4		
