= John Stewart (British Army officer, died 1796) =

Scottish mercenary soldier and politician

John Stewart (c. 1709 – 1796), of Pittendriech, Edinburgh, was a Scottish mercenary soldier and politician.

He was the son of Francis Stuart, 7th Earl of Moray and his second wife Jean, the daughter of John Elphinstone, 4th Lord Balmerino.

Stewart was a Member of Parliament (MP) for Anstruther Easter Burghs for 1741–1747.

In the short-lived Earl of Loudoun's Highlanders of the British Army, he served as a captain from 1745 to 1747, after which he entered the service of the States-General (of the Netherlands) in 1747. There he became a lieutenant-colonel in the Earl of Drumlanrig's regiment (1747), a colonel in Lt.-General Charles Halkett's regiment (1754) and colonel-commandant of Major-General Charles William Stewart's regiment in 1758. He served as colonel of the latter regiment from 1760 to 1795, being promoted to major general in 1772.

He died in Scotland in 1796. Married to Jean Home, he had no children.
