= Caithness (Parliament of Scotland constituency) =

Constituency of the Old Parliament of Scotland

Before the Act of Union 1707, the barons of the shire or sheriffdom of Caithness elected commissioners to represent them in the unicameral Parliament of Scotland and in the Convention of Estates. After 1708, Caithness alternated with Buteshire in returning one member to the House of Commons of Great Britain and later to the House of Commons of the United Kingdom.

== List of shire commissioners ==
- 1641: James Sinclair of Murkill
- 1648: Laird of Sandsyde (Innes)
- 1649–50: Sir John Sinclair of Dunbeath
- 1661: James Sinclair of Murkill
- 1661–63: William Sinclair of Latheron and Dunbeath
- 1665 convention: James Innes of Sandsyde
- 1667 convention, 1669–74: no representation
- 1678 convention: William Dunbar of Hempriggs
- 1678 convention: John Sinclair of Ulbster
- 1681–82: George Sinclair of Bilbster
- 1685–86, 1702-05: Sir George Sinclair of Clyth (died c.1705)
- 1689–93: James Sinclair of Freswick (died c.1693)
- 1693–95: Alexander Manson of Bridgend
- 1695–1701: Patrick Murray of Pennyland
- 1703–07: Sir James Sinclair of Dunbeath
- 1706–07: Sir James Dunbar of Hempriggs

== See also ==
- List of constituencies in the Parliament of Scotland at the time of the Union
