= Sir John Anstruther, 1st Baronet =

Scottish politician

Sir John Anstruther, 1st Baronet (c. 1678 – 27 September 1753) was a Scottish politician who sat in the Parliament of Scotland from 1702 to 1707, and in the British House of Commons from 1708 to 1741.

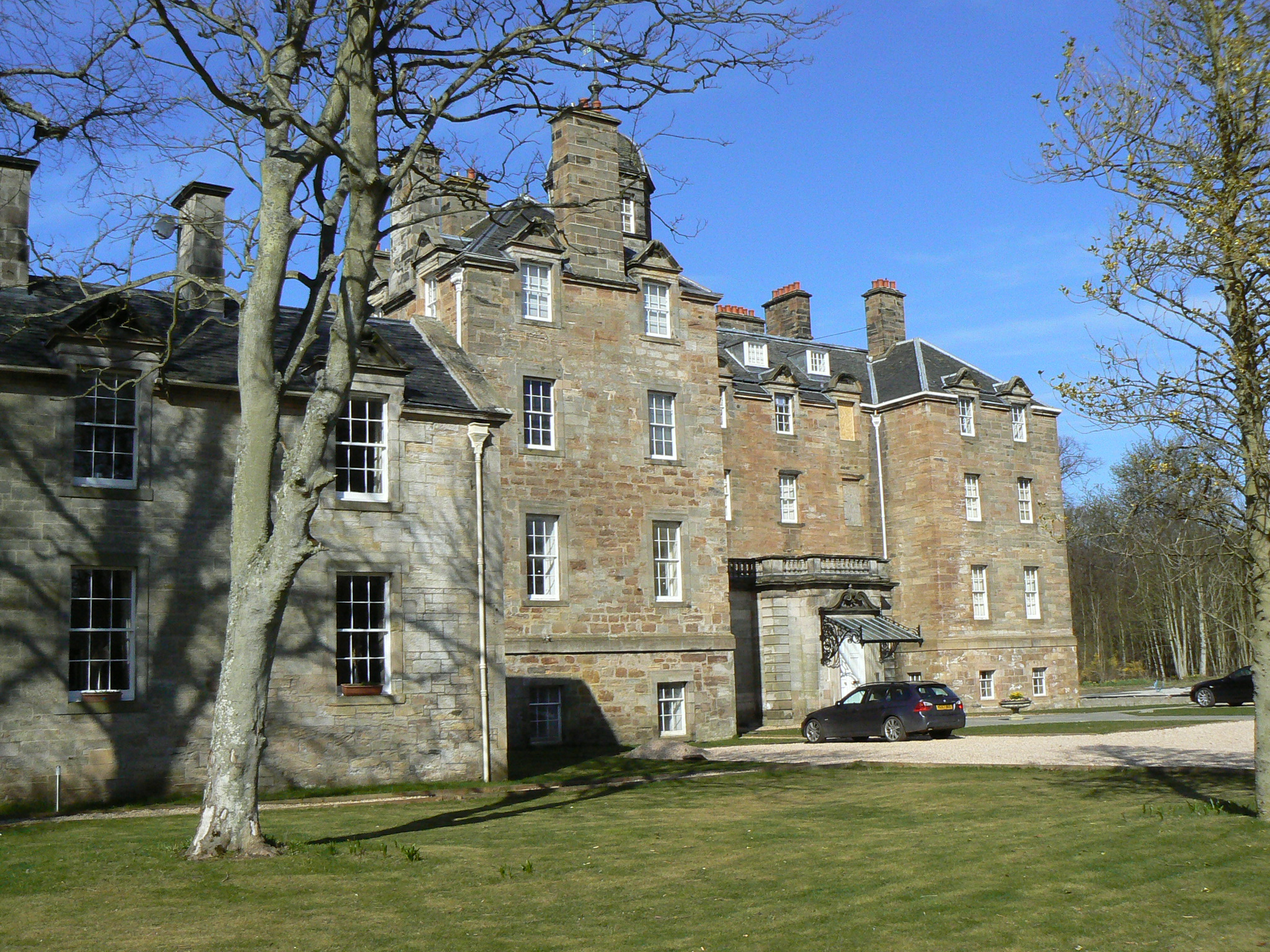
Elie House, Fife

Anstruther was the only son of Sir William Anstruther of Anstruther, M.P. in the Parliament of Scotland and known as Lord Anstruther, Senator of the College of Justices of Scotland (S.C.J.). Anstruther was created a baronet in the Baronetage of Nova Scotia on 6 January 1700 and succeeded his father in 1711, inheriting Elie House in Elie, Fife.

Anstruther served as Burgh Commissioner in the Parliament of Scotland for Anstruther Easter from 1702 to 1707. His voting record was mixed and his opinions appeared inconsistent. In general he opposed the Union, but took some lead from Lord Rothes and eventually fell in line with the Squadrone. After the Union of England and Scotland, he was not included among the Scottish representatives in the House of Commons in 1707, but was returned unopposed as Member of Parliament for Anstruther Burghs at the 1708 general election. At the 1710 general election there was a contest at Anstruther where he was initially elected but unseated on petition on 10 April 1712. He was elected again in 1713. At the 1715 general election he was returned instead as MP for Fife. He was returned unopposed again in the general elections of 1722, 1727 and 1734. He did not stand in 1741.

In 1727 Anstruther was appointed "Sole Master of Works, Inspector and Director-General of all royal buildings in Scotland" by King George II, with responsibility for repairs and alterations to royal palaces and castles north of the border.

Anstruther married, in 1717, Lady Margaret Carmichael, the daughter of James Carmichael, 2nd Earl of Hyndford and had two sons and a daughter. He was succeeded by his eldest son John.

He had a personal library of some significance and books from his collection can be identified by the presence of his engraved bookplate.

Parliament of Scotland
Preceded by Patrick Murray	Burgh Commissioner for Anstruther Easter; 1702–1707	Succeeded by Parliament of Great Britain
Parliament of Great Britain
New constituency	Member of Parliament for Anstruther Burghs; 1708–1712	Succeeded by George Hamilton
Preceded by George Hamilton	Member of Parliament for Anstruther Burghs; 1713–1715	Succeeded by Philip Anstruther
Preceded by Sir Alexander Areskine	Member of Parliament for Fife; 1715–1741	Succeeded by David Scott
Baronetage of Nova Scotia
New creation	Baronet (of Anstruther); 1700–1753	Succeeded by Sir John Anstruther
Political offices
Preceded by John Campbell of Mamore	Master of Work to the Crown of Scotland; 1727–1743	Succeeded by George Dundas
