= Pittenweem (Parliament of Scotland constituency) =

Scottish Parliament constituency

Pittenweem in Fife was a royal burgh that returned one commissioner to the Parliament of Scotland and to the Convention of Estates.

After the Acts of Union 1707, Pittenweem, Anstruther Easter, Anstruther Wester, Crail and Kilrenny formed the Anstruther Easter district of burghs, returning one member between them to the House of Commons of Great Britain.

== List of burgh commissioners ==
- 1662-63: Thomas Swinton
- 1665 convention, 1681–82: George Russel, councillor
- 1669–74: Harry Wilkie
- 1678 (convention): John Myrton, bailie
- 1685–86: James Cook, bailie
- 1689 (convention), 1689–1701: George Smyth of Giblistoun
- 1702–07: George Smyth the younger of Giblistoun

== See also ==
- List of constituencies in the Parliament of Scotland at the time of the Union
