= 1702 Scottish general election =

Scottish general election, 1702
- 30 June 1702 – before 6 May 1703
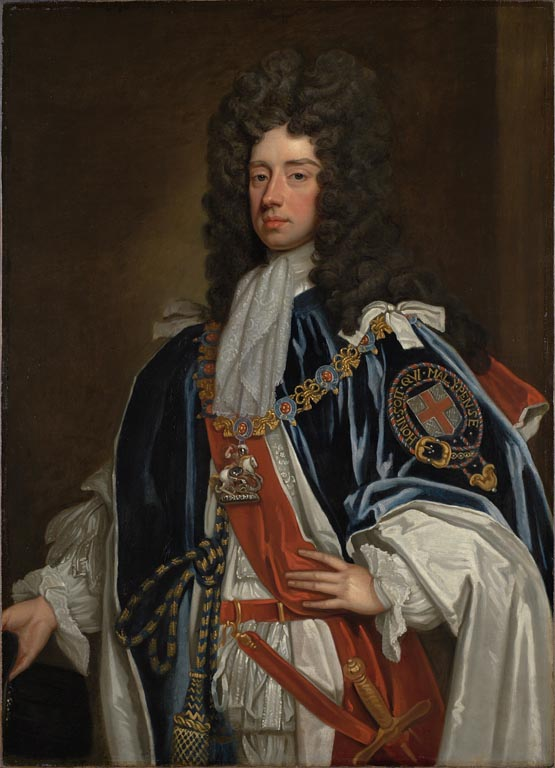

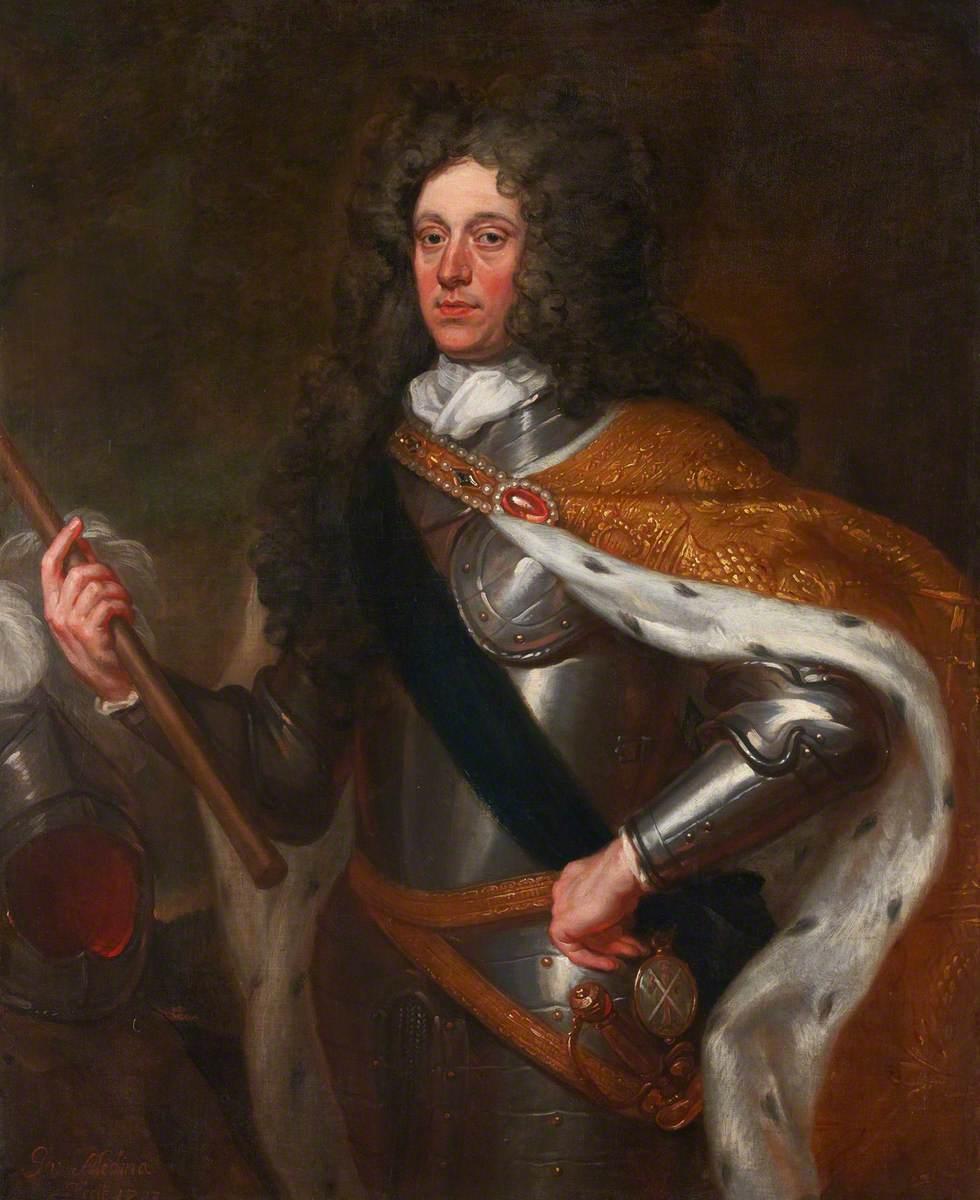

	First party	Second party	Third party
Leader	Duke of Queensberry	Duke of Hamilton	Earl of Home
Party	Court Party	Country Party (Britain)	Cavaliers (Jacobites)
Seats won	90-100	~60	~70
Seat change	▼	?	▲

General elections were held in Scotland in 1702 to return members to serve in the Parliament of Scotland. The new government would be a minority Court Party administration, led by the Duke of Queensberry as Lord High Commissioner. The election took place amidst the War of the Spanish Succession, and one of Queensberry's key main priorities was to secure Scottish funding for the war. The new parliament assembled in Edinburgh on 6 May 1703.

Queensberry sought to build an alliance between his Court party and the Episcopalian Cavalier faction, whose parliamentary presence had been increased by the election. This alliance was in part driven by Queen Anne's own Anglicanism and Stewart heritage. For their support, the Cavaliers requested greater toleration for Episcopalians. The parliament was still predominantly Presbyterian, and neither Queensberry or his Court faction favoured toleration. Any increased support from Cavaliers as a result of a deal would likely be balanced by a loss in support from Presbyterian opponents to toleration.

== Dates of election ==
At this period elections did not take place at the same time in every constituency. The returning officer in each shire or burgh fixed the precise date (see hustings for details of the conduct of the elections).
