= John Bethune of Craigfoodie =

Scottish landowner

- Born: August 5, 1670; Edinburgh
- Died: April 17, 1734 (aged 63); City of London
- Other name: Beaton
- Occupations: landowner and politician
- Known for: clergyman in England

John Bethune of Craigfoodie (1670–1734), pronounced and sometimes written as Beaton, was a Scottish landowner who later became a clergyman in England.

== Origins ==
Baptised in Edinburgh on 5 August 1670, he was the son of William Bethune of Craigfoodie (died 1699) and his wife Mary Bethune, daughter of Andrew Bethune of Blebo (died 1653). His younger brother George Bethune (died 1735) went into business in Massachusetts, becoming a prominent citizen of Boston.

His father worked as an advocate in Edinburgh, and in 1680 bought the estate of Craigfoodie, which in 1695 was the second most valuable property in the parish of Dairsie in Fife, where he built the present house. This was to be the inheritance of his elder brother Robert, while he studied at the University of St Andrews with the aim of entering the ministry of the Church of Scotland, but on the death of his brother in 1696 he left university with an MA degree, to prepare for a career as a landowner.

== Life ==
On the death of his father in 1699, he became laird of Craigfoodie. He signed two petitions on 9 January 1701, and supported an act on 5 August 1704.

His father had however incurred debts and in the exceptionally heavy winter of 1708–09, when food and money were everywhere short, he had to sell lands and goods. Craigfoodie went to his brother-in-law, Charles Bell WS (died 1731), while he and his family moved to London. On a testimonial from St Andrews University, he was accepted as a priest in the Church of England, becoming chaplain to the Lock Hospital in Southwark and curate of St Michael, Cornhill in the City of London, where he died on 17 April 1734, survived by his wife.

== Family ==
On 15 February 1699 in Edinburgh he married Anna Urie (died 1741), daughter of the Reverend Andrew Urie (died 1707), and they had nine children. Two of their sons made careers and raised families in Sussex:

- John Bethune (1702–1775) became a surgeon in East Grinstead, and married Mildred Thorpe (1717–1782), first cousin of George Nevill, 1st Earl of Abergavenny.
- Andrew Bethune (1705–1767) became an Anglican priest living at Rowfant in the parish of Worth, and married Mary Watson (1703–1774), widow of John Goodwin who was the nephew of Charles Goodwin.
