= William Anstruther =

Scottish judge

Sir William Anstruther, Lord Anstruther (died 1711) was a Scottish judge.

== Biography ==
He was born into a very ancient Scottish family, the son of Sir Philip Anstruther of Anstruther, a royalist who was taken prisoner at the Battle of Worcester, had his estates sequestered by Cromwell and restored to him by Charles II, and died in 1702.

Sir William represented the shire of Fife in the Parliament of Scotland in 1681, and strongly opposed the measures of James, Duke of York, then lord high commissioner in Scotland. He was again returned for that county in 1689, and continued to represent it until the Act of Union (1707).

In the revolution of 1688, Sir William took the side of the Prince of Orange, and was rewarded by being appointed one of the ordinary lords of session (22 October 1689), and later a member of the privy council. In 1704, he was nominated one of the lords of justiciary in the room of Lord Aberuchil. By a charter under the great seal dated 20 April 1704, and ratified by parliament 14 September 1705, the baronies of Anstruther and Ardross and the office of bailliary of the lordship of Pittenweem, with certain minor estates, rights, and privileges, and the office of carver and master of the household to her majesty and her heirs, were granted to Sir William Anstruther and his heirs for ever. Sir William Anstruther was strongly in favour of the union, and his name appears frequently in the division lists during the period when the question was agitating the Scotch parliament.

== Works ==
Anstruther was the author of a volume of essays, interspersed with verse, published in 1701 under the title of Essays, Moral and Divine, of which his friends thought so poorly that in his own interest they begged him not to publish it; and it is said that after the death of the judge, which happened in 1711, his son bought up all purchasable copies and suppressed the work. The contents of the volume were as follows:

- (1) Against Atheism;
- (2) Of Providence;
- (3) Of Learning and Religion;
- (4) Of Trifling Studies, Stage Plays, and Romances;
- (5) Of the Incarnation of Jesus Christ and the Redemption of Mankind.

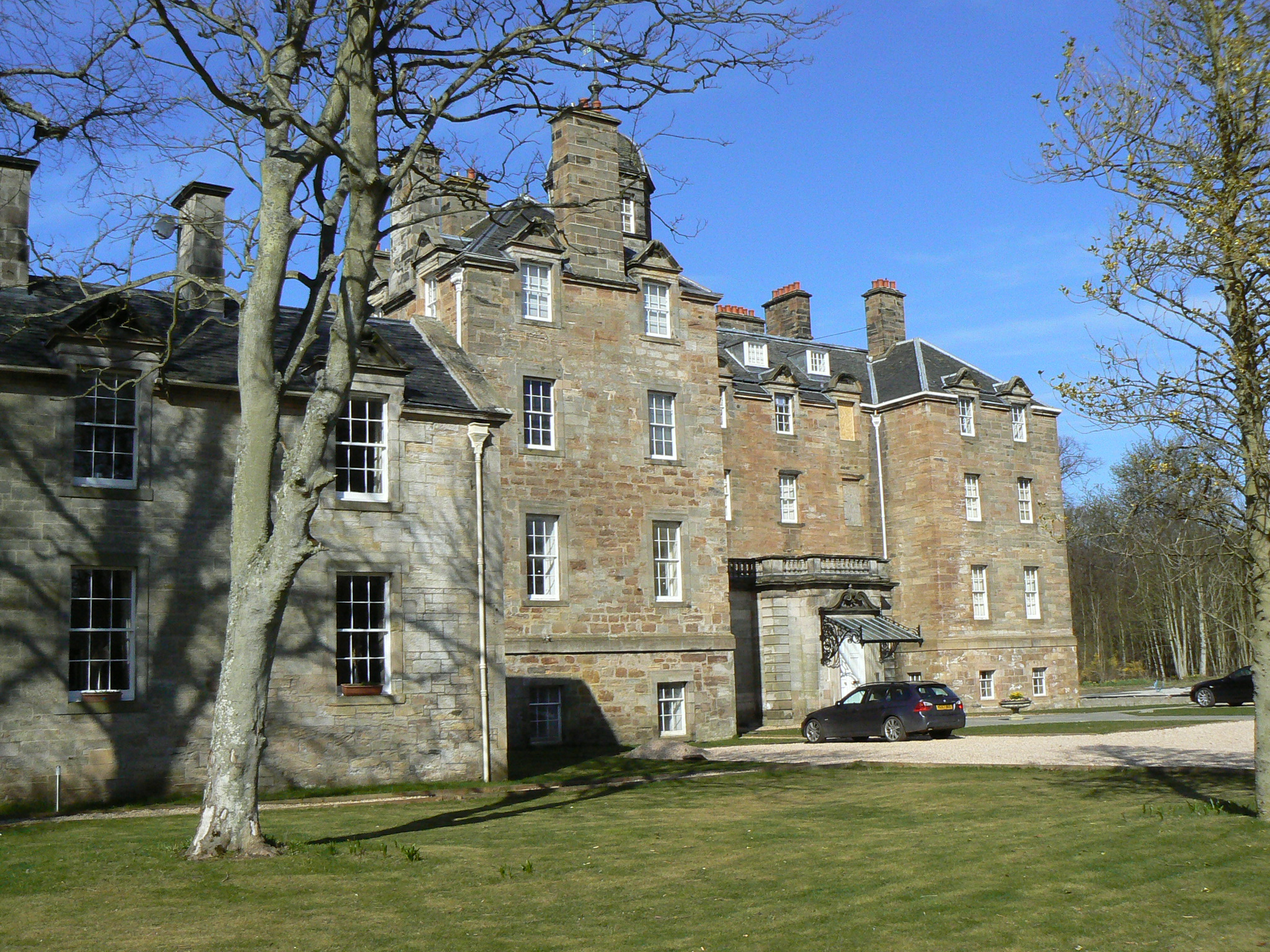
Elie House, Fife

== Private life ==
He bought the Elie estate in Fife, where in 1687 he built Elie House.

Sir William Anstruther was married to Lady Helen Hamilton, daughter of John Hamilton, 4th Earl of Haddington. Their only son was Sir John Anstruther, 1st Baronet, of Anstruther.
