= Linlithgow (Parliament of Scotland constituency) =

Constituency of the Old Parliament of Scotland

Linlithgow was a royal burgh that returned one commissioner to the Parliament of Scotland and to the Convention of Estates.

After the Acts of Union 1707, Linlithgow, Lanark, Peebles and Selkirk formed the Linlithgow district of burghs, returning one member between them to the House of Commons of Great Britain.

== List of burgh commissioners ==
- 1661–63: Andro Glen, merchant, provost
- 1665 convention: Robert Stewart, provost
- 1667 convention, 1669–74, 1678 convention: Robert Milne, merchant, provost
- 1685–86: Alexander Milne
- 1689 convention, 1689–98: William Higgins, merchant burgess (resigned to enter Church c.1699)
- 1700–02, 1702–07: Walter Stueart of Pardovein, former provost

== See also ==
- List of constituencies in the Parliament of Scotland at the time of the Union
