= Anstruther Easter (Parliament of Scotland constituency) =

Constituency of the Old Parliament of Scotland

Anstruther Easter in Fife was a royal burgh, created in 1583, that returned one commissioner to the Parliament of Scotland and to the Convention of Estates.

After the Acts of Union 1707, Anstruther Easter, Anstruther Wester, Crail, Kilrenny and Pittenweem formed the Anstruther Easter district of burghs, returning one member between them to the House of Commons of Great Britain.

== List of burgh commissioners ==
- 1661–63: Alexander Black, councillor
- 1665 convention: Andrew Martins, bailie
- 1667 convention: not represented
- 1673–74: Alexander Gibson
- 1678 convention: James Lauson, bailie
- 1681–82: Robert Anstruther
- 1685–86: Robert Innes of Blairtoun, councillor
- 1689 convention, 1689–90: David Spence, former baillie of Edinburgh (expelled 1693)
- 1696–1701: Patrick Murray of Dullary
- 1702–07: Sir John Anstruther

== See also ==
- List of constituencies in the Parliament of Scotland at the time of the Union
