= Sir John Anstruther, 2nd Baronet =

Scottish industrialist and politician (1718–1799)

Sir John Anstruther 2nd Baronet

Baronet of Anstruther
- In office 1753–1799
- Preceded by: John Anstruther
- Succeeded by: Philip Anstruther-Paterson

Member of Parliament for Anstruther Burghs
- In office 1790–1793
- Preceded by: John Anstruther
- Succeeded by: Robert Anstruther

Member of Parliament for Anstruther Burghs
- In office 1780–1783
- Preceded by: George Damer
- Succeeded by: John Anstruther

Member of Parliament for Anstruther Burghs
- In office 1766–1774
- Preceded by: Sir Henry Erskine, Bt
- Succeeded by: Philip Anstruther

Personal details
- Born: 27 December 1718 Edinburgh, Scotland
- Died: 4 July 1799
- Spouse: Janet Fall
- Children: 4
- Education: University of Glasgow
- Occupation: Industrialist; politician

Sir John Anstruther, 2nd Baronet (27 December 1718 – 4 July 1799) was a Scottish industrialist and politician.

== Early life and education ==
He was born in Edinburgh, the only surviving son of Sir John Anstruther, 1st Baronet, M.P., by Lady Margaret Carmichael, the daughter of James, 2nd Earl of Hyndford. He was educated at the University of Glasgow (1733). He succeeded his father as a baronet in the Baronetage of Nova Scotia on 27 September 1753.

== Early career ==
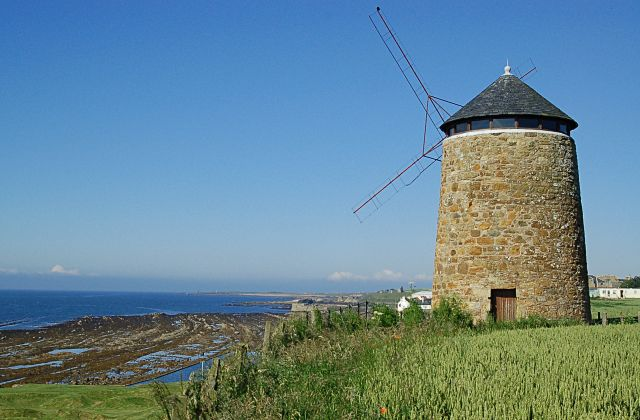
St Monan's windmill

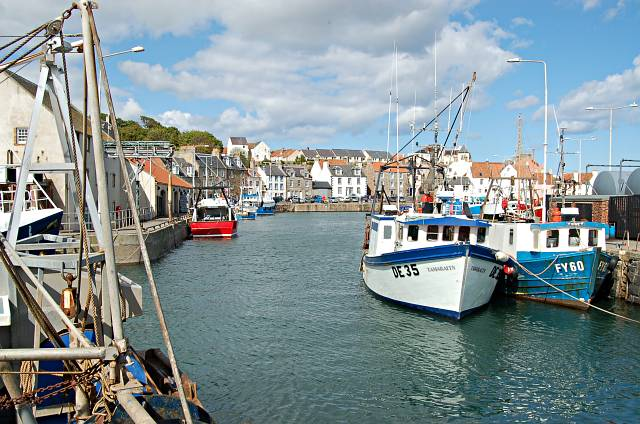
Pittenweem Harbour

In 1771, with his business partner, Robert Fall, he established the Newark Coal and Salt Company. Coal was extracted from land to the east of St Monans in Fife, and some was used to heat salt pans which operated, in conjunction with the still-standing St Monan's Windmill, on the shore to the east of the village. Production at the salt pans employed 20 men and the colliery 36 men. Both saltpans and coal mine were linked by a waggonway to Pittenweem harbour, which was expanded and developed at Sir John's expense.

== Political career ==
He served as Member of Parliament for Anstruther Burghs from 1766 to 1774, 1780–1783 and 1790–1793.

== Personal life ==
He married Janet Fall, Queen of the Gypsies and the second daughter of James Fall, on 4 October 1750. Lady Anstruther was painted by Sir Joshua Reynolds in 1761. They had 3 surviving sons and a daughter. He was succeeded by his eldest son, Philip Anstruther-Paterson.

Like his father, he had a personal library of some significance and books from his collection can be identified by the presence of his engraved bookplate.

== Death ==
He died on 4 July 1799.

Parliament of Great Britain
Preceded by Sir Henry Erskine, Bt	Member of Parliament for Anstruther Burghs; 1766–1774	Succeeded by Philip Anstruther
Preceded by George Damer	Member of Parliament for Anstruther Burghs; 1780–1783	Succeeded by John Anstruther
Preceded by John Anstruther	Member of Parliament for Anstruther Burghs; 1790–1793	Succeeded by Robert Anstruther
Baronetage of Nova Scotia
Preceded by John Anstruther	Baronet (of Anstruther); 1753–1799	Succeeded by Philip Anstruther-Paterson
