= David Bethune of Balfour =

Scottish landowner and politician

David Bethune of Balfour (1648–1708), his last name pronounced and sometimes written as Beaton, was a Scottish landowner and politician from Fife who opposed the Union of 1707.

== Origins ==
Born in 1648, probably at the family castle of Balfour in the parish of Markinch, he was the son of James Bethune, 13th of Balfour, (1620–1690) and his first wife Anna Moncreiff (1630–1649), daughter of Sir John Moncreiff of Moncreiff, 1st Baronet.

== Life ==
On the death of his father in 1690 he inherited the ancestral lands as 14th laird of Balfour. Elected by his fellow landowners, he became a Commissioner for the county of Fife in the Parliament of Scotland.

Among his contributions was a protest on 13 September 1703 against an Act that would allow the importation of French wines and brandy, on the grounds that this was dishonourable, inconsistent, and prejudicial: the measure passed anyway. In 1705 he protested against a proposed treaty with England, and was recorded in the roll of members on 11 October 1706. In the debates over the proposed Union with England and abolition of the Parliament of Scotland he voted against, right up to the last vote over selecting Scottish peers and MPs to sit at Westminster.

He died shortly before 7 April 1708, being succeeded by his eldest son.

== Family ==
On 11 March 1669 in Edinburgh he married Rachel Hope (b. 1653), daughter of Sir James Hope of Hopetoun and his first wife Anna Foulis, and they had eight children including:

James Bethune, his heir, who married Ann Hamilton.
Catherine Bethune, who married David Campbell of Keithilk.
Elizabeth Bethune, who married Henry Rymer.
Helen Bethune, who married John Landale.
Ann Bethune, who married David Bethune of Bandon, heir to her brother.
