= Anstruther Wester (Parliament of Scotland constituency) =

Constituency of the Old Parliament of Scotland

Anstruther Wester in Fife was a royal burgh, created in 1587, that returned one commissioner to the Parliament of Scotland and to the Convention of Estates.

After the Acts of Union 1707, Anstruther Wester, Anstruther Easter, Crail, Kilrenny and Pittenweem formed the Anstruther Easter district of burghs, returning one member between them to the House of Commons of Great Britain.

== List of burgh commissioners ==
- 1661: Thomas Watson, councillor
- 1665 convention: Peter Oliphant the younger, bailie
- 1672–1690 not eligible as a non-Royal Burgh
- 1689 convention, 1689–1701: Robert Clelland
- 1702–07: Sir Robert Anstruther of Wrae and Balcaskie

== See also ==
- List of constituencies in the Parliament of Scotland at the time of the Union
