= New Galloway (Parliament of Scotland constituency) =

New Galloway was a royal burgh that elected one Commissioner to the Parliament of Scotland before 1707.

== Constituency ==
New Galloway in the Stewartry of Kirkcudbright was made a royal burgh by charter of Charles I in 1630, and this was confirmed by Act of Parliament in 1633.

== Burgh Commissioners ==
- 1633-1644: Robert Gordon of Knockbrex
- 1661–1663, 1667 convention, 1669–1674: Robert Dickson of Bughtrig
- 1685-1686: Robert Alexander, merchant
- 1689 convention, 1689-1690: James Gordon of Craichlaw (died 1690)
- 1690-1702: Hugh Dalrymple of North Berwick
- 1703-1707: George Home of Whitfield

== See also ==
- List of constituencies in the Parliament of Scotland at the time of the Union
