= Kilrenny =

Coordinates: 56°14′N 2°41′W

Kilrenny: Scottish Gaelic: Cill Reithnidh
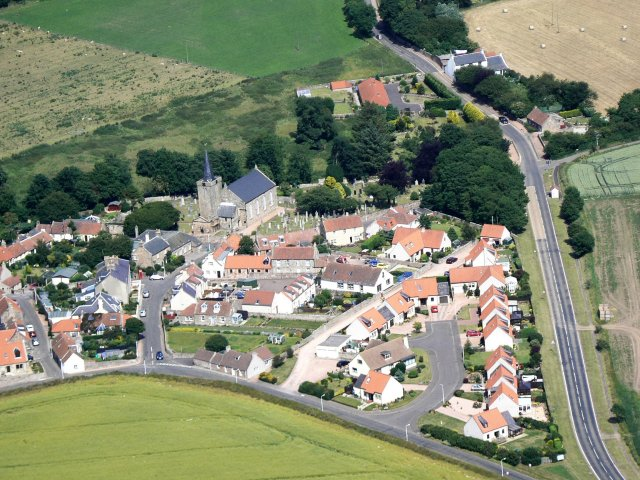
- Kilrenny from the air

- Location within Scotland
- Lieutenancy area: Fife
- Country: Scotland
- Sovereign state: United Kingdom
- Police: Scotland
- Fire: Scottish
- Ambulance: Scottish

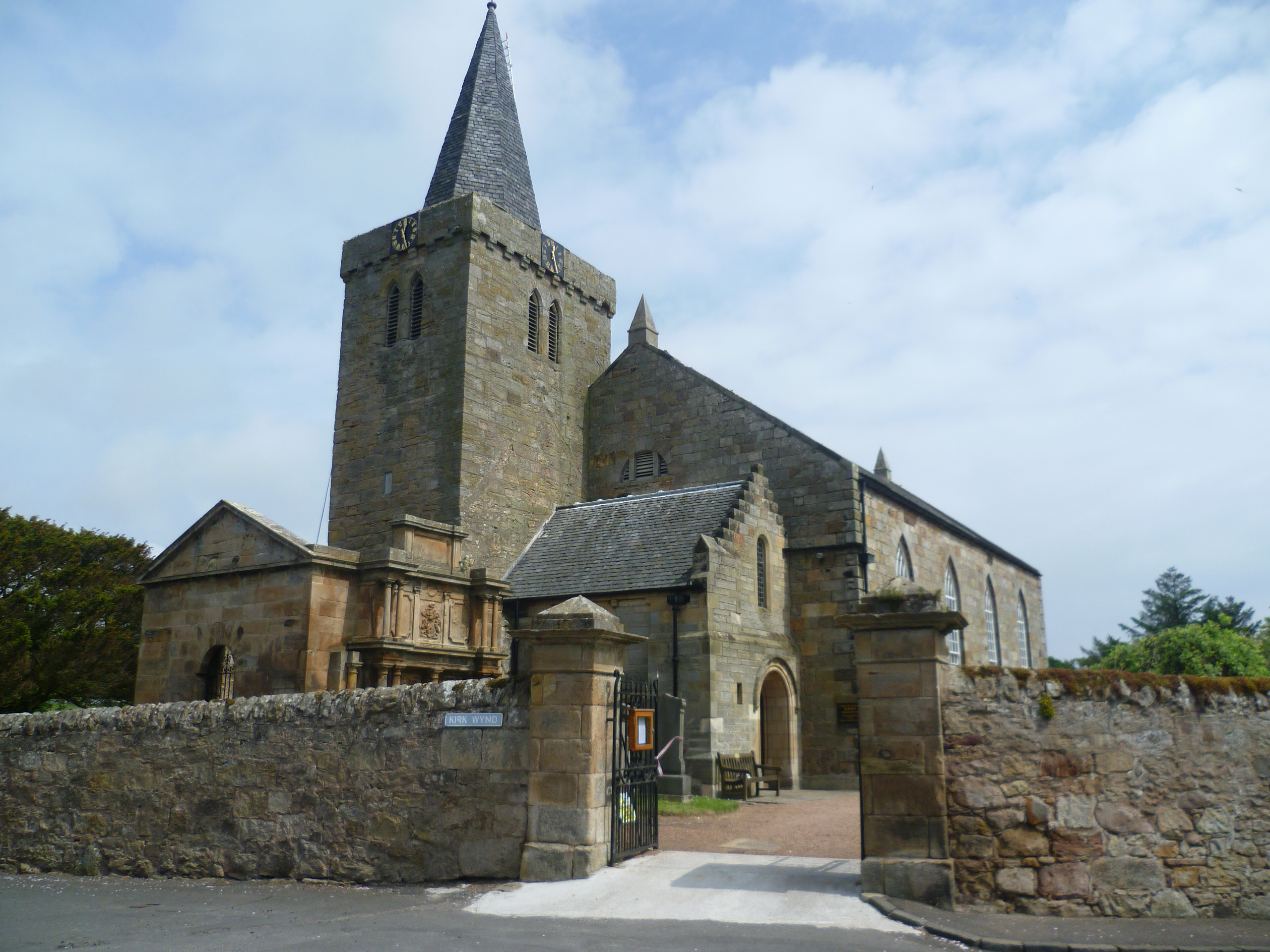
Parish Church

Kilrenny (Scottish Gaelic: Cill Reithnidh) is a village in Fife, Scotland. Part of the East Neuk, it lies immediately to the north of (but inland and separate from) Anstruther on the south Fife coast.

The first element of the name is from the Scottish Gaelic cill, meaning 'church'. The '-renny' element may perpetuate a worn down form of Etharnan or Itharnan, an early churchman who 'died among the Picts' in 669 according to the Annals of Ulster." That Kilrenny is of early Christian origin is suggested both by the Kil- element of the place-name, and by the Skeith Stone, a carved stone with marigold motif (circa 700?) which stands to the west of the village, possibly marking an ancient area of sanctity.

The village was formerly Upper Kilrenny, until nearby Lower Kilrenny changed its name to Cellardyke in the 16th century. The oldest part of the present church is the 15th-century tower, with the body of the building rebuilt in 1807–08 (re-using the original stones as building rubble).

The village is a conservation area has many well-preserved houses in the local vernacular style, with crow-stepped gables, datestones, forestairs, pan-tiled roofs etc.
