= Royal burgh =

Type of Scottish municipal corporation

Royal Burghs (Scotland) Act 1833 (Note: The citation of this act by this short title was authorised by section 1 of, and the first schedule to, the Short Titles Act 1896. Due to the repeal of those provisions it is now authorised by section 19(2) of the Interpretation Act 1978.)
- Act of Parliament
- Parliament of the United Kingdom
- Long title: An Act to alter and amend the Laws for the Election of the Magistrates and Councils of the Royal Burghs in Scotland.
- Citation: 3 & 4 Will. 4. c. 76
- Territorial extent: Scotland (Note: Preamble.)

Dates
- Royal assent: 28 August 1833
- Commencement: 28 August 1833 (Note: The Acts of Parliament (Commencement) Act 1793.)
- Repealed: 1 January 1901
Other legislation
Amended by	Burgh Police, etc. (Scotland) Act 1847; Statute Law Revision Act 1874
Repealed by	Town Councils (Scotland) Act 1900

Status: Repealed

Text of statute as originally enacted

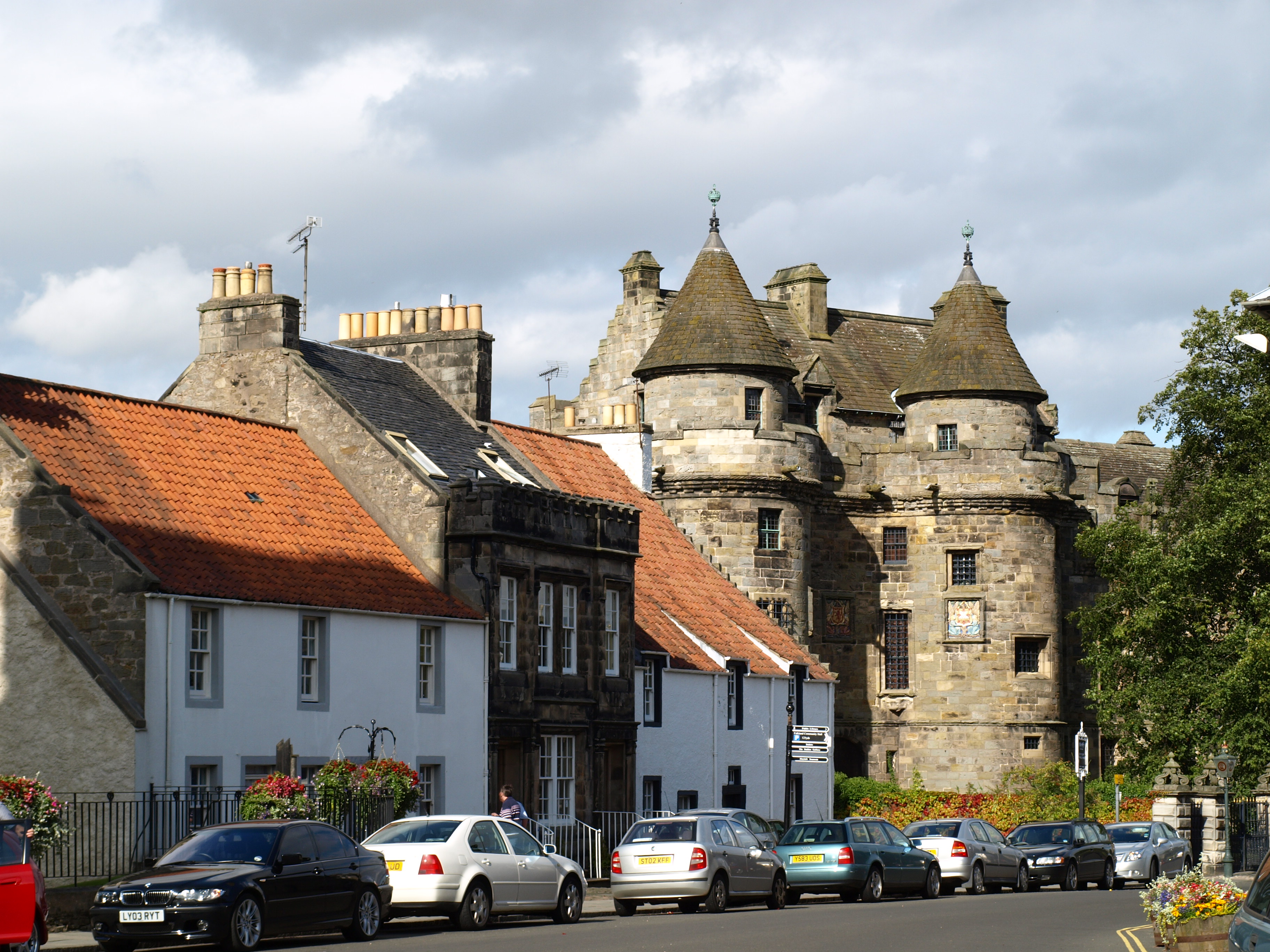
Falkland in Fife, created a royal burgh in 1458

A royal burgh (/ˈbʌrə/ BURR-ə) was a type of Scottish burgh which had been founded by, or subsequently granted, a royal charter. Although abolished by law in 1975, the term is still used by many former royal burghs.

Most royal burghs were either created by the Crown, or upgraded from another status, such as burgh of barony. As discrete classes of burgh emerged, the royal burghs—originally distinctive because they were on royal lands—acquired a monopoly of foreign trade.

An important document for each burgh was its burgh charter, creating the burgh or confirming the rights of the burgh as laid down (perhaps orally) by a previous monarch. Each royal burgh (with the exception of four 'inactive burghs') was represented in the Parliament of Scotland and could appoint bailies with wide powers in civil and criminal justice. By 1707 there were 70 royal burghs. The Royal Burghs (Scotland) Act 1833 (3 & 4 Will. 4. c. 76) reformed the election of the town councils that governed royal burghs. Those qualified to vote in parliamentary elections under the Reform Act 1832 were now entitled to elect burgh councillors.

== Origins ==
Before the reign of David I, Scotland had no towns. The closest thing to towns were the larger-than-average population concentrations around large monasteries, such as Dunkeld and St Andrews, and regionally significant fortifications. Scotland, outside Lothian at least, was populated by scattered hamlets, and outside that area, lacked the continental-style nucleated village. David I established the first burghs in Scotland, initially only in Middle-English-speaking Lothian (note: Tain claims a charter dating from 1066 under Malcolm III). The earliest burghs, founded by 1124, were Berwick and Roxburgh. However, by 1130, David had established burghs in Gaelic areas: Stirling, Dunfermline, Perth and Scone, as well as Edinburgh. The conquest of Moray in that same year led to the establishment of burghs at Elgin and Forres. Before David was dead, St Andrews, Montrose, and Aberdeen were also burghs. In the reigns of Máel Coluim IV and William, burghs were added at Inverness, Banff, Cullen, Auldearn, Nairn, Inverurie, Kintore, Brechin, Forfar, Arbroath, Dundee, Lanark, Dumfries and (uniquely for the west coast) Ayr. New Lothian burghs also came into existence, at Haddington and Peebles. By 1210, there were 40 burghs in the Scottish kingdom. Rosemarkie, Dingwall and Cromarty were also burghs by the Scottish Wars of Independence.

The date of the initial establishment of burghs in Scotland is obscure. The historian Ian D. Whyte points to the Leges Burgorum (Laws of the Burghs) as the best known compilation of medieval burgh laws, saying that most of the laws therein "were modelled on the mid-twelfth century customs of Newcastle upon Tyne" at a time when Newcastle was under Scottish rule. A mid-twelfth century date corresponds to the reigns of two Scottish kings: David I (1124–1153) and William I (1165–1214). In 1609, the publisher of the Laws of the Burghs stated that burgh laws were begun by David I, but this was called into question in 1807 by George Chalmers, who pointed out that David I never held Newcastle. At any rate, Whyte notes that medieval Scottish burghs, when compared to their English counterparts, were more uniform and, by the fourteenth century, more politically active.

Because of Scottish trading patterns, Scottish burghs came to be populated by foreigners, notably Flemings, French, and English.

The burgh's vocabulary was composed totally of either Germanic terms (not necessarily or even predominantly English) such as croft, rood, gild, gait and wynd, or French ones such as provost, bailie, vennel, port and ferme. The councils that governed individual burghs were individually known as lie doussane, meaning the dozen.

== List of burghs ==
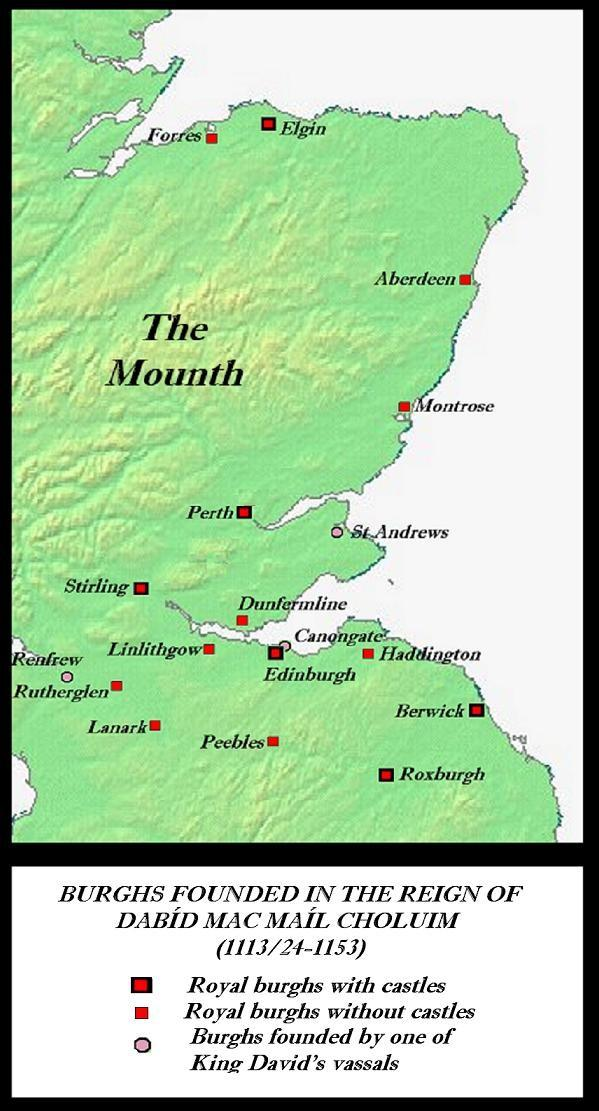
Burghs by 1153

The list is based on the following references.

=== By 1153 (royal) ===
- Aberdeen
- Berwick-upon-Tweed (before 1124)
- Dundee
- Lanark (1140)
- Edinburgh
- Dunfermline
- Elgin
- Forres
- Linlithgow
- Montrose
- Peebles
- Perth (took precedence over all other burghs except Edinburgh)
- Rutherglen
- Roxburgh (Created a royal burgh c. 1124. By the fifteenth century it had decayed, and on the destruction of Roxburgh Castle in 1460 it ceased to exist. Part of Roxburgh was included in the burgh of barony of Kelso in 1614, and in 1936 Lord Lyon recognised Kelso as the successor to the royal burgh.)
- Stirling
- Tain

=== By 1153 (burghs passing between the king and other lords) ===
- Haddington (granted to Ada, Countess of Northumberland between 1139 and 1178)
- Renfrew (before 1153 had been granted to Walter Fitzalan, High Steward of Scotland, reconfirmed as royal burgh 1397)

=== By 1153 (burghs controlled by other lords) ===
- Canongate (now part of Edinburgh)
- St Andrews

=== By 1214 (royal) ===
- Ayr
- Auldearn
- Cullen
- Dumfries
- Forfar
- Inverkeithing
- Inverness
- Jedburgh
- Kinghorn
- Kintore
- Lauder
- Nairn

=== By 1214 (burghs passing between the king and other lords) ===
- Crail

=== By 1214 (burghs controlled by other lords) ===
- Annan (a royal burgh by 1532)
- Arbroath
- Brechin
- Dundee
- Glasgow
- Kirkintilloch
- Prestwick

=== Burghs created by Alexander II ===
- Dingwall (1226) (later became a burgh of barony of the Earl of Ross 1321, re-established as a royal burgh in fifteenth century)
- Dumbarton (1222)

=== By 1300 (royal) ===
- Auchterarder (status had been lost by 1707)
- Cromarty (appears to have become a burgh of barony under the Earl of Ross 1315, re-established as a royal burgh 1593)
- Fyvie
- Kilrenny
- Lanark
- Rosemarkie
- Selkirk
- Wigtown

=== By 1300 (burghs controlled by other lords) ===
- Crawford (had ceased to exist by 16th century)
- Dunbar (became a royal burgh 1445)
- Inverurie (became a royal burgh 1558)
- Irvine (became a royal burgh 1372)
- Kelso (never became a royal burgh)
- Lochmaben (a royal burgh by 1447)
- Newburgh, Aberdeenshire (never became a royal burgh)
- Newburgh, Fife (became a royal burgh in 1631)
- Urr (short-lived)

=== Early 14th century ===
- Cupar (by 1327)
- Inverbervie (1342)

=== Burghs created by Robert II ===
- Banff (1372)
- North Berwick (1373; suppressed by William Douglas, 1st Earl of Douglas, current charter 1568)

=== Burghs created by Robert III ===
- Rothesay (1400/1)

=== Burghs created by James II ===
- Dunbar (1445)
- Falkland (1458)
- Kirkcudbright (1455)
- Lochmaben (date unknown)
- Tain c 1439

=== Burghs created by James III ===
- Elgin (1457) (royal burgh status lost in 1312 restored)
- Kirkwall (1486)
- Nairn (1476) (royal burgh status lost in 1312 restored)

=== Burghs created by James IV ===
- Dingwall (1497/8) (re-established)
- Forres (1496) (charter restored royal burgh status lost in 1312, although it may have been a de facto royal burgh)
- Kintore (1506/7) (re-erected as a royal burgh)
- Whithorn (1511)

=== Burghs created by James V ===
- Annan (1538/9) (status confirmed)
- Auchtermuchty (1517)
- Burntisland (1541)
- Pittenweem (1541)

=== Burghs created by Mary, Queen of Scots ===
- Inverurie (1558) (restored lost royal burgh status)
- Rattray (1564)

=== Burghs created by James VI ===
- Anstruther Easter (1583)
- Anstruther Wester (1587)
- Arbroath (1599)
- Cromarty (1593) (re-established). Disenfranchised by Privy Council 1672. Later re-established as a burgh of barony in 1685.
- Culross (1592)
- Earlsferry (1589) (charter confirmed status since time immemorial)
- Glasgow (1611) (had been a de facto previously)
- Fortrose (1590) became part of royal burgh of Rosemarkie 1592
- Kilrenny (1592) (The burgh was included in roll of royal burghs by mistake and continued to enjoy that status, despite attempting to resign it)
- Rosemarkie (1592) by union of royal burgh of Fortrose and burgh of barony of Rosemarkie re-established as royal burgh of Fortrose 1661
- St Andrews (1620) (confirmation of de facto status)
- Sanquhar (1598)
- Stranraer (1617)
- Wick (1589)

=== Burghs created by Charles I ===
- Brechin (1641) (de facto status ratified by parliament)
- Dornoch (1628)
- Fortrose (1661) (reforming of royal burgh of Rosemarkie)
- Inveraray (1648)
- Kirkcaldy (1644) (although de facto since 1574)
- New Galloway (1630)
- South Queensferry (1636)
- Newburgh, Fife (1631)

=== Burghs created by William II ===
- Campbeltown (1700)

=== 20th century ===
- Auchterarder (1951) (reinstated as a royal burgh)
- Elie and Earlsferry (1930) (formed by union of royal burgh of Earlsferry and police burgh of Elie)
- Kilrenny, Anstruther Easter and Anstruther Wester (formed by union of three royal burghs 1930)

== Abolition and status since 1975 ==
The rights of the royal burghs were preserved (if not guaranteed) by Article XXI of the Treaty of Union between Scotland and England of 1707, which states "That the Rights and Privileges of the Royal Boroughs in Scotland as they now are Do Remain entire after the Union and notwithstanding thereof".

Royal burghs were abolished in 1975 by the Local Government (Scotland) Act 1973, and the above-mentioned Article XXI, which was thus rendered redundant, was deemed by Her Majesty's Government to be abrogated by the 1973 act. The towns are now sometimes referred to officially as "former royal burghs", for instance by the Local Government Boundary Commission for Scotland.

The issue of the future status of royal burghs was discussed during debate on the Local Government Bill. In the Commons on 4 December 1972, Ronald Murray, the member of parliament (MP) for Edinburgh, Leith, stated, "Most of the well-known cities and towns of Scotland became royal burghs by Charter. The Bill does not say that those Charters are removed or are of no legal effect, but Schedule 24 repeals the legislation upon which they appear to stand. I hope that the Government do not intend to abolish entirely the ancient rights of royal burghs, at least to be royal burghs."

In June 1973, David Steel (MP for Roxburgh, Selkirk and Peebles), unsuccessfully introduced an amendment that "the title of 'Provost' shall attach to the chairman of any community council which is based on any existing burgh .. to .. carry forward a title which appears, for example, in the Royal Charters of those burghs".

In 1977, Alick Buchanan-Smith (MP for North Angus and Mearns) asked Frank McElhone, Parliamentary Under-Secretary of State for Scotland: "Why a community council for a former Royal burgh is not able to use the words 'Royal Burgh' in its title; and what scope there is for the continuance of historical titles under the present organisation of local authorities."

In reply, McElhone stated: "The title which may be used by a community council is a matter for the district council to decide when drawing up the scheme for community councils in its area. Section 23 of the Local Government (Scotland) Act 1973 governs any change of name of region, islands or district councils. There is no statutory ban to the continuance of historic titles for other purposes."

Accordingly, some community councils established since 1975 have the term "Royal Burgh" incorporated in their title. Lord Lyon has permitted the armorial bearings of a number of royal burghs to be rematriculated by community councils.

== See also ==
- Cities of Scotland
- Commissioner (Scottish Parliament)
- Convention of Royal Burghs
- Scotland in the High Middle Ages
- List of UK place names with royal patronage
- List of burghs in Scotland
