= David Erskine, Lord Dun =

Scottish advocate, judge and commissioner to parliament

The Right Honourable Lord Dun
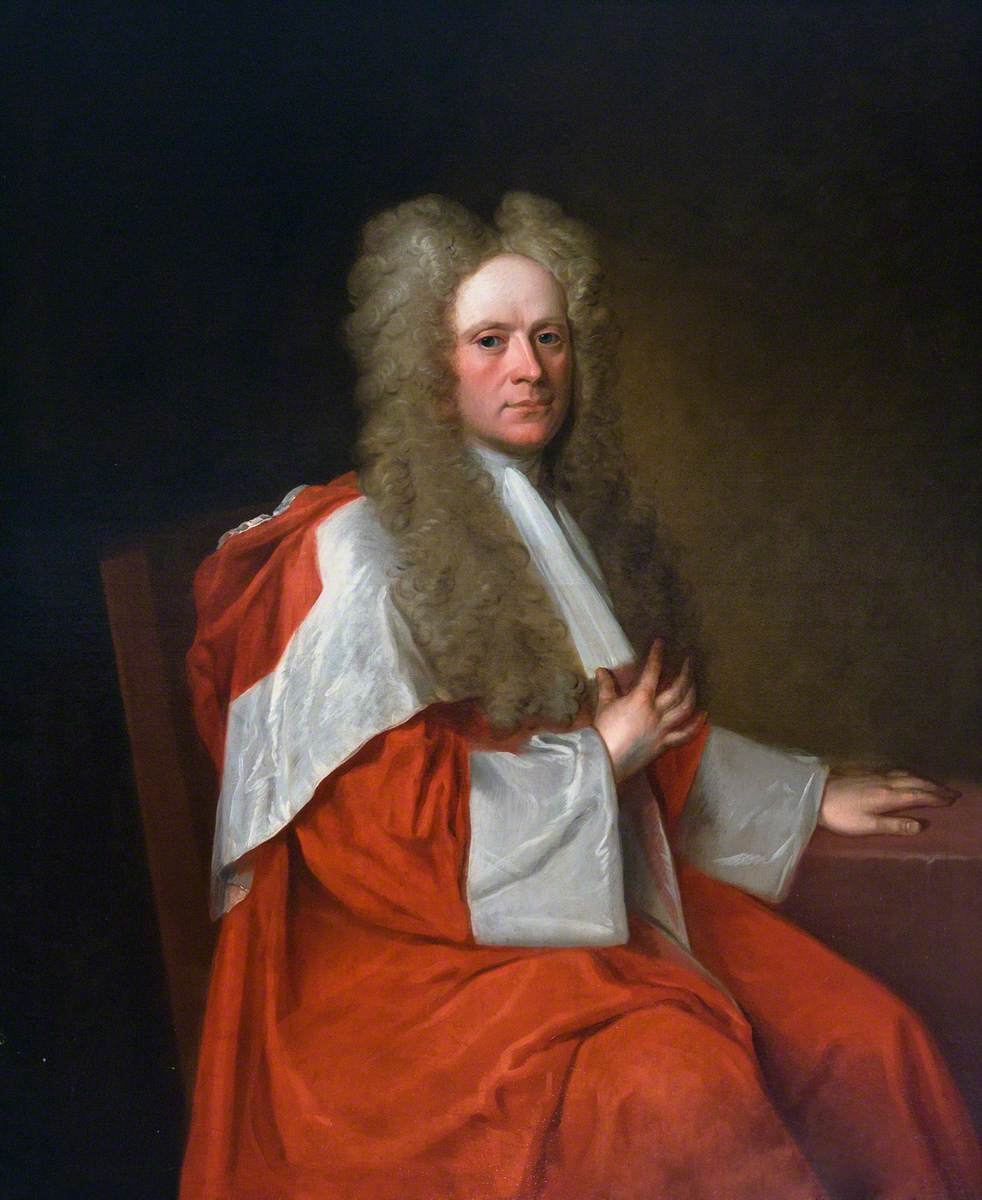
- Lord Dun in the Robes of the Court of Session by William Aikman
- Born: David Erskine; 1670
- Died: 26 June 1758 (aged 87–88)
- Education: St Andrews University; Paris University
- Spouse: Magdalene Riddell (m. 1707; died 1736)
- Parent(s): David Erskine of Dun; Margert Lumsden
- Relatives: James Erskine (brother)

David Erskine, Lord Dun (1670 – 26 May 1758), 13th Laird of Dun, was a Scottish advocate, judge and Commissioner to the Parliament of Scotland.

== Early life ==
Erskine was born in 1670 near Montrose, in Angus. He was the third, but second surviving, son of David Erskine of Dun (1640–1698) and Margert (née Lumsden) Ramsay. His mother, a daughter of Sir James Lumsden of Innergellie, was a widow of Thomas Ramsay of Bamff, Perthshire. His father succeeded his elder brother, Sir Alexander Erskine, as the Laird of Dun. His elder brother was James Erskine, an MP for Aberdeen Burghs, whom his father disinherited in favour of David. His younger brother was Alexander Erskine, of Balhall (whose descendants became heir male of Erskine of Dun following the death of Lord Dun's great-grandson, William John Erskine, in 1798).

He studied at the universities of St. Andrews and Paris.

== Career ==
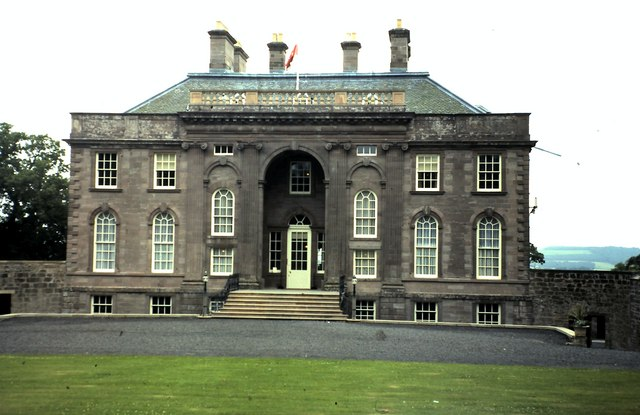
House of Dun

Erskine became a member of the Faculty of Advocates on 19 November 1698, and soon rose to eminence. He represented Forfarshire at the convention of estates, 1689, and in the Parliaments of 1690, 1691, 1693, 1695, and 1696, and opposed the union.

In November 1710 he took his seat as an ordinary lord by the title of Lord Dun, and on 13 April 1714 was also appointed a Lord of Justiciary. He resigned his justiciary gown in 1744 and his office as an ordinary lord in 1753.

He is author of a little volume entitled 'Lord Dun's Friendly and Familiar Advices adapted to the various Stations and Conditions of Life,’ 12mo, Edinburgh, 1754. His arguments on the doctrine of passive obedience were assailed the same year by Dr. Robert Wallace, minister at Moffat, who characterises Erskine as 'a venerable old man, of very great experience, and greatly distinguished for piety.'

== Personal life ==
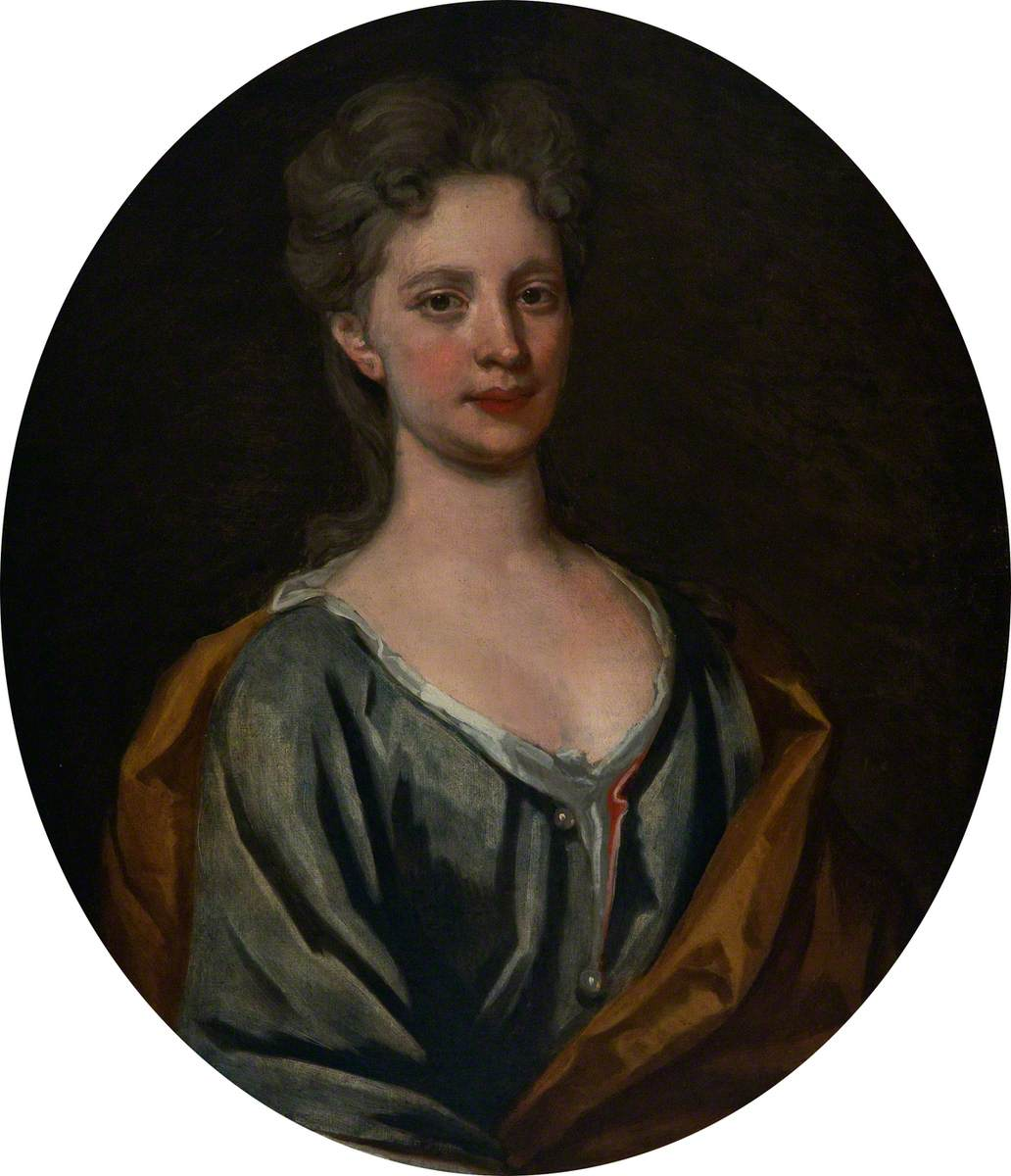
Portrait of his wife, Magdalene, by William Aikman

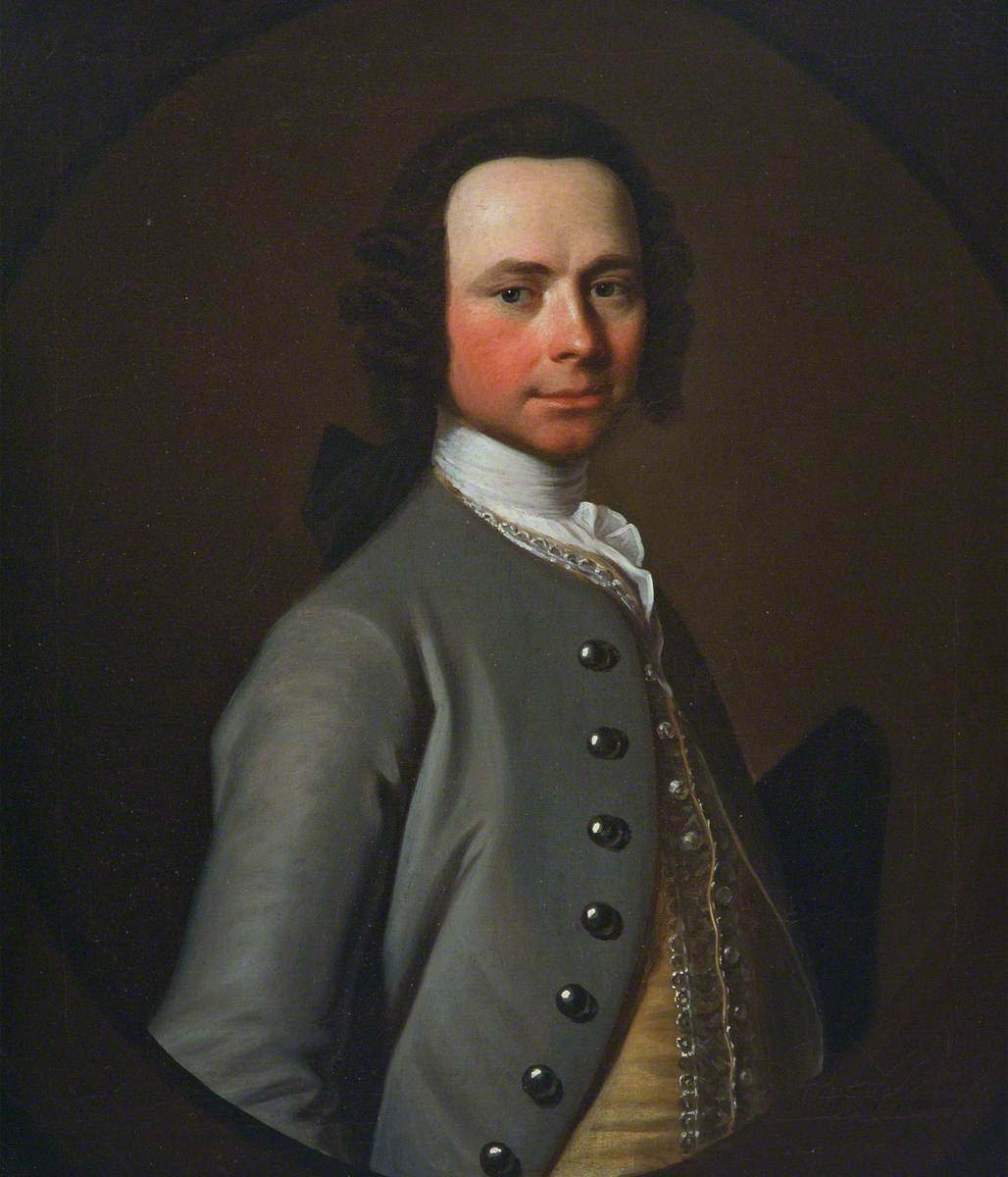
Portrait of his son, John, by Allan Ramsay, 1747

In 1707, Erskine was married to Magdalene Riddell (1672–1736), daughter and heiress of John Riddell of Haining in Selkirk, a Commissioner for Selkirkshire in the Parliament of Scotland (and son of Andrew Riddell of Haining. Her aunt, Violet Riddell, was the third wife of Sir Robert Dalzell, 1st Baronet; which made Magdalene a first cousin of Sir John Dalzell, 2nd Baronet. As the only heir of her father, Magdalene had inherited Haining, which she sold in 1701 to Andrew Pringle of Clifton for his second son John Pringle. Together, they were the parents of one son:

- Anne Erskine (1709–1735), who married James Ogilvy, Lord Ogilvy, the eldest son and heir apparent of David Ogilvy, 3rd Earl of Airlie and Lady Grizel Lyon (a daughter the 3rd Earl of Strathmore and Kinghorne). (Note: James Ogilvy, Lord Ogilvy took part in the Jacobite rising of 1715, for which he was attained by an Act of Parliament on 13 November 1715. Following his father's death in 1717, he became de jure 4th Earl of Airlie, however he could not claim the title because of the attainder. In 1725 he obtained a pardon from the Crown, and returned home but obtained a pardon from the Crown before his marriage to Anne Erskine in December 1830, shortly before his death in 1730.) After his death, she married Sir Alexander Macdonald, 7th Baronet in 1733. After her death, he married Lady Margaret Montgomerie, a daughter of Alexander Montgomerie, 9th Earl of Eglinton, and Susanna Kennedy (a daughter of Sir Archibald Kennedy, 1st Baronet).
- John Erskine of Dun (1712–1787), who married Margaret Inglis, a daughter of Sir John Inglis, 2nd Baronet of Crammond.

Lord Dun died 26 May 1758 in the eighty-fifth year of his age.

=== Descendants ===
Through his only son John, he was a grandfather of John Erskine of Dun (d. 1812), who married Mary Baird (eldest daughter of William Baird, Esq. of Newbyth House, Haddingtonshire, and sister to Sir David Baird, 1st Baronet). They were the parents of Capt. William John Erskine of the 9th Light Dragoons (who was killed in the Irish Rebellion at the Battle of Kilcullen), Alicia Erskine of Dun (who died unmarried in 1824), and Margaret Erskine of Dun (who married Archibald Kennedy, 1st Marquess of Ailsa in 1793; their second son, The Hon. John Kennedy of Dun who assumed the surname of Erskine on inheriting Dun from his aunt; he married Lady Augusta FitzClarence, an illegitimate daughter of King William IV and his longtime mistress Dorothea Jordan, in 1827).

== See also ==
- James Erskine, Lord Grange
