= James Oswald (elder) =

Scottish politician

James Oswald was a Burgh Commissioner of the Parliament of Scotland, 1703-1707, representing Kirkcaldy and, later, the Member of Parliament for Dysart Burghs in the House of Commons of Great Britain.

== Early life ==
He was born in 1650, second son of Thomas Oswald of Kirkcaldy in Fife and Isobel Anderson. His father was a merchant navy captain and he followed the same occupation becoming a wealthy captain. It was noted that in 1681 he was a captain trading to Holland and bringing back goods on his own account. By 1689 he was a burgess of Kirkcaldy and successfully petitioned the Privy Council to relieve the burden of taxation on Kirkcaldy, because of the decay of trade of the burgh.

== Contested Election to Parliament ==
Under an Act of Parliament of 1469, burgh members of Parliament were chosen by the town councils, so for the election of 1702 the town council of Kirkcaldy met on 8 September. The member, called "burgh commissioner", since 1689 had been John Boswell, but Captain James Oswald stood against him. Since 1690 the Earl of Leven had been annually re-elected as provost. There followed a power struggle between the Earl of Leven and the Oswald family lasting almost a year.

First, Captain Oswald claimed that the Earl of Leven, the provost, could not take part in the election meeting on several grounds. On his part, the provost disallowed four Oswald supporters from voting, councillors Henry Oswald, John Durie (future father in law of his son James) and two others.

In the election there were 9 votes for Boswell, including the provost, and 9 votes for Captain Oswald, including himself and Thomas Oswald. However Thomas Oswald, as procurator, produced a formal document protesting the exclusion of the four above and recording their votes. The provost declared Boswell elected, but the majority of the council were recorded as electing Captain Oswald.

But on 5 October Henry Oswald was elected provost in place of the Earl of Leven and a week later the council voted to send Captain Oswald (and advocates) to Edinburgh to claim his seat in Parliament.

However, the Earl of Leven's father, George, Earl of Melville, was president of the Privy Council, and on 26 November the Privy Council decreed there had been no lawful quorum in the Kirkcaldy council, declared the election of officials null and void, that Captain James Oswald and 7 other councillors were ineligible to vote at the next election. Captain Oswald was ordered to seek pardon, "on his knees" from the Earl of Leven for "opprobrious words uttered by him against the earl".

When the new Parliament first met in May 1703, it placed Kirkcaldy on a list of contested elections and thus the contest went to the Committee for Controverted Elections. With the aid of the Earl of Rothes, hereditary sheriff of Fife, Oswald was able to overturn Leven’s influence and on 17 August, he was admitted to Parliament.

Meanwhile on 15 December 1702, the Earl of Leven's father was replaced as president of the Privy Council, by the Marquis of Annandale. The Privy Council on 15th Sept. 1703 cancelled their previous decision and the burgh officials (Oswald's allies) were reinstated.

== Parliament ==
In parliament he allied with the Country party, rather than Rothes' Squadrone group. The Country party led by the Duke of Hamilton arose in 1702-3 to address various grievances against the governing party, but they were divided between those in favour and against the 1689 revolution settlement.

Shortly before Oswald was admitted to Parliament, it passed the Act of Security on 13 August 1703, which stipulated that the successor to Queen Anne must be a protestant, but not the same person who sat on the English throne, unless various trade and other conditions were met. However, the royal assent was withheld until 1704. The Duke of Hamilton tabled a motion on 17 July 1704 proposing these conditions and refusing assent to government funding until this was enshrined in law. Oswald voted in favour of the Duke of Hamilton’s motion. With the help of Rothes' group this was passed and the royal assent given to the Act.

When the proposed union with England came before Parliament, it first considered Article 1 of the treaty of union, namely that the two Kingdoms should on 1 May 1707 be united into one. Before the question was put, the Duke of Atholl presented a resolution against an Incorporating Union. The Country party urged that such a union was against the interests and honour of the country. Oswald voted for this protest, which was recorded in the parliamentary record. Oswald then voted against Article 1, but it was carried by a majority of 34 votes.

When Parliament considered Article 3 of the treaty, namely the amalgamation of the parliaments into one, Oswald voted for the resolution of the Marquis of Annandale against an Incorporating Union, but the vote was lost. He lost likewise when voting against the article itself, which abolished the Scottish Parliament. Oswald was consistently in opposition to the proposed union. He, together with Scrymgeour of Dundee, Allardyce of Aberdeen, William Sutherland of Elgin, and Andrew Watson of St Andrews set about amending later articles give better terms. All, except Scrymgeour, were nationalists, with Allardyce and Sutherland furthermore being Jacobites.

Oswald missed the final vote ratifying the treaty, by which time Kirkcaldy burgh council called him home to save expense.

== Burgh of Kirkcaldy ==
Back in Kirkcaldy, Oswald was elected as Provost in 1706–8, 1710–12 and 1714–15. As Provost in 1714, he concurred in the council’s unanimous decision, motivated by ‘true and just principles of loyalty’, to celebrate the coronation of George I.

== Parliament of Great Britain ==
By the Acts of Union 1707 burgh constituencies of Scotland (except Edinburgh) were put into groups, each only electing one member of the Union parliament. In the group each burgh had one vote and in case of a tie the presiding burgh, which rotated, had a casting vote. Kirkcaldy was placed in the Dysart Burghs group, which had 4 burghs. In 1710, the first M.P. for Dysart burghs was found not qualified and James Abercromby, the illegitimate half-brother of the Duke of Hamilton, was elected at a by-election.

Later that year, a general election came about in the wake of the collapse of the Whig government led by Godolphin and the Whig Junto, who instigated the Union in 1707. Abercromby was overawed by the recent election of James Oswald as provost of Kirkcaldy, which would be presiding burgh at that election with a casting vote. Abercromby calculated he could only win if Oswald did not stand against him. As he did stand, Abercromby withdrew and Oswald was elected unopposed.

In Parliament, Oswald aligned with the Tories, who won the general election on a policy of pursuing peace with France. Oswald persuaded his constituency to send a motion for peace in July 1712, when it seemed in prospect. When in May 1713 he notified Kirkcaldy of the Peace of Utrecht, which ended the War of Spanish Succession, a great celebration was held in the town. No speech by Oswald in the House of Commons was recorded. In 1711 he partook in the drafting of a bill to regulate the Scottish linen industry. He voted against Mungo Graham when he was unseated on petition on 10 February 1711. On 7 Feb. 1712 he voted in favour of the Scottish toleration bill.

Following the death of the Duke of Hamilton, his half brother Abercromby had no hope of retaking Dysart Burghs and Oswald was re-elected on 22 Sept. 1713. But he retired at the next election in 1715 because of his age.

== Dunnikier ==
Dunnikier House, now Path House, in Kirkcaldy, was built by John Watson in 1692, but was sold to James Oswald in 1703 when he was Dean of Guild. From then until 1938, James Oswald's descendants owned the estate of Dunnikier. However, in 1791-93, his great grandson James Townsend Oswald arranged for a new mansion to be built in the northern part of the parish of Kirkcaldy, by Alexander Laing. but the estate continued to be named Dunnikier. The family lived there until the last of the line, Colonel St Clair Oswald, C.R., died at Dunnikier House on 14th Dec 1938. and his wife, on her death in 1973, was interned at Dunnikier.

== Later life ==
In 1715, his son and heir also called James married Ann Durie, daughter of John Durie, Captain Oswald’s ally in Kirkcaldy council.

He died in 1716. He was succeeded as owner of Dunnikier by his son James Oswald (1685-1725), then by his son also called James Oswald (1715–69), who like his grandfather became M.P. for Dysart Burghs, in 1741.

== Bibliography ==
- James Aikman (translator and continuation author), "History of Scotland of George Buchanan and Continuation to the Present Time"; publ. Blackie & Son, Edinburgh, 1856
- Keith M. Brown et al.(eds.), "The Records of the Parliaments of Scotland to 1707" (online publication, University of St Andrews, 2007–2009). Website: rps.ac.uk (retrieved July 2020)
- Joseph Foster, "Members of Parliament, Scotland, Including the Minor Barons, the Commissioners for the Shires and the Commissioners for the Burghs, 1357-1882"; print. by Hazell, Watson and Viney, London, 1882.
- Michael Fry, "The Union: England, Scotland and the Treaty of 1707"; publ. Birlinn, Edinburgh, 2006
- House of Commons, "Report from the select committee to whom the several petitions from the Royal Burghs of Scotland were referred"; publ. House of Commons, Westminster, 14–15 June 1821.
- George Lockhart, "Memoirs Concerning the Affairs of Scotland from Queen Anne's Accession to the Throne, to the Commencement of the Union of the Two Kingdoms of Scotland and England, in May 1707"; publ. J. Baker, London, 1714
- Lachlan Macbean, "The Kirkcaldy Burgh Records with the Annals of Kirkcaldy, the town's charter"; publ.The Fifeshire Advertiser, Kirkcaldy,1908.
- Edward Porritt, "The Unreformed House of Commons - parliamentary representation before 1832";publ. Cambridge, University Press, 1909.
- P. W. J. Riley, Union of England and Scotland; publ. Manchester Univ.Press, 1978.
- Sir Robert Sibbard, "The History, Ancient and Modern, of the Sheriffdoms of Fife and Kinross "; publ. R.Tullis, London, 1803.
- D.Szechi, "Jacobitism and Tory Politics 1710-14"; publ. John Donald, Edinburgh, 1984.
- C. S. Terry, The Scottish Parliament: its constitution and procedure, 1603–1707; publ. James MacLehose and Sons, Glasgow, 1905.
- Nicholas Tindal (translator and continuation author), "The History of England by Mr.Rapin de Thoyras Continued from the Revolution to the Accession of King George II"; publ. John and Paul Knapton, London, 1745
- David Wilkinson, "Dysart Burghs" in "The History of Parliament: the House of Commons, 1690-1715", Vol.2 "Constituencies", eds. Eveline Cruickshanks, Stuart Handley, D. W. Hayton; publ.Cambridge University Press, 2002;

Also online: // www.histparl.ac.uk/volume/1690-1715/constituencies/dysart-burghs (retrieved June 2020)

- David Wilkinson, "Oswald, James (d. 1716), of Dunnikier, Fife" in "The History of Parliament: the House of Commons, 1690-1715", Vol.5 "Members O-Z", eds. Eveline Cruickshanks, Stuart Handley, D. W. Hayton"; publ.Cambridge University Press, 2002;

Also online: //www.histparl.ac.uk/volume/1690-1715/member/oswald-james-1716 (retrieved May 2020)

== References and notes ==
Parliament of Scotland
Preceded by John Boswell	Burgh Commissioner for Kirkcaldy; 1702–1707	Succeeded by Parliament of Great Britain
Parliament of Great Britain
Preceded by James Abercrombie	Member of Parliament for Dysart Burghs; 1710–1715	Succeeded by William Kerr
