= James Ramsay =

James Ramsay may refer to:

- Sir James Ramsay (1589–1638), Scottish soldier
- James Ramsay (bishop) (c. 1624–1696), Bishop of Ross
- James Ramsay (abolitionist) (1733–1789), Anglican minister and abolitionist
- James Ramsay (minister) (1672–1749), Church of Scotland minister
- James Ramsay (painter) (1789–1854), English portrait painter
- Sir James Ramsay, 8th Baronet (1797–1859), Scottish baronet
- Sir James Ramsay, 10th Baronet (1832–1925), British historian and landowner
- James Graham Ramsay (1823–1903), North Carolina politician
- James Garden Ramsay (1827–1890), politician in colonial South Australia
- James Ramsay (Canadian politician) (1866–1935), merchant and politician in British Columbia, Canada
- James Ramsay (governor) (1916–1986), governor of Queensland
- James Ramsay (1923–1996), co-founder of the James and Diana Ramsay Foundation in South Australia
- Jim Ramsay (1930–2013), Australian politician
- James Ramsay, 17th Earl of Dalhousie (born 1948), British land-owner
- James O. Ramsay (born 1942), Canadian statistician
- James Ramsay (footballer) (1898–1969), Scottish footballer and manager

== See also ==
- James Broun-Ramsay, 1st Marquess of Dalhousie (1812–1860), British colonial leader
- James Ramsey (disambiguation)
