= Ramsay baronets of Bamff (1666) =

Escutcheon of the Ramsay Baronets of Bamff

The Ramsay baronetcy, of Bamff in the County of Perth, was created in the Baronetage of Nova Scotia on 3 December 1666 for Gilbert Ramsay. The title became extinct on the death of the twelfth Baronet in 1986.

== Ramsay baronets, of Bamff (1666) ==
- Sir Gilbert Ramsay, 1st Baronet (died c. 1686)
- Sir James Ramsay, 2nd Baronet (died 1730)
- Sir John Ramsay, 3rd Baronet (died 1738)
- Sir James Ramsay, 4th Baronet (c. 1706–1782)
- Sir John Ramsay, 5th Baronet (died 1783)
- Sir George Ramsay, 6th Baronet (killed in a duel 1790)
- Sir William Ramsay, 7th Baronet (died 1807)
- Sir James Ramsay, 8th Baronet FRSE (1797–1859)
- Sir George Ramsay, 9th Baronet (1800–1871)
- Sir James Henry Ramsay, 10th Baronet (1832–1925)
- Sir James George Ramsay, 11th Baronet (1878–1959)
- Sir Neis Alexander Ramsay, 12th Baronet (1909–1986)
