= General Middleton (disambiguation) =

John Middleton, 1st Earl of Middleton (c. 1608–1674) was an English Army lieutenant general. General Middleton may also refer to:

- Frederick Dobson Middleton (1825–1898), British Army general
- John Middleton (British Army officer) (1678–1739), British Army brigadier general
- Troy H. Middleton (1889–1976), U.S. Army lieutenant general
