= James Oswald (younger) =

Scottish politician

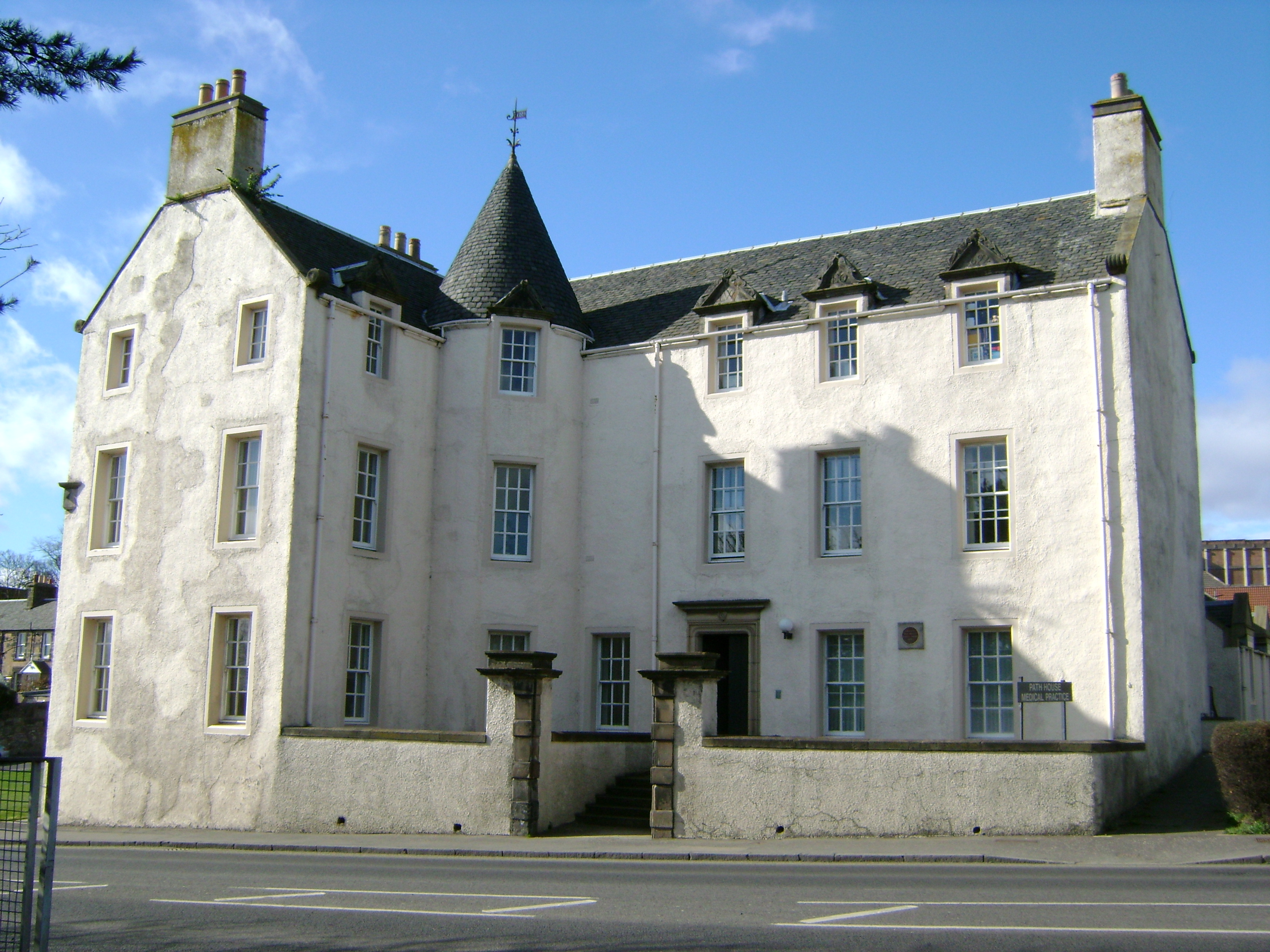
Dunnikier, Kirkcaldy, now called the Path House

James Oswald (1715 – 24 March 1769) was a Scottish politician who sat in the House of Commons from 1741 to 1768.

Oswald was the grandson of James Oswald a politician of Kirkcaldy, and son of James Oswald whom he succeeded in c.1725, inheriting his Kirkcaldy home, Dunnikier, now known as the Path House.

His brother John was Bishop of Raphoe and another brother Thomas was an army officer.

He was admitted at Lincoln's Inn in 1733.

The Oswald family became the dominant force in Kirkcaldy politics in the 18th century and Dysart, the second largest burgh was controlled by the St. Clair interest. The combined Oswald and St. Clair influence often decided who was to be elected. Oswald was elected Member of Parliament for Dysart Burghs in 1741 and was a Commissioner of the Navy in 1745. In 1747 he exchanged the seat with James St Clair and was elected MP for Fife until 1754. In 1752 he was Commissioner for trade and plantations. Oswald exchanged seats with James St Clair again in 1754 and was elected MP for Dysart Burghs. He was Lord Commissioner of the Treasury in 1760 and Vice-Treasurer of Ireland from 1763 to 1767.

He retired in 1768 when his son James Townsend Oswald took over the seat and died in 1769 at the age of 52. In 1747 he had married Elizabeth, daughter of Joseph Townsend, a London brewer and the widow of Abraham Reynardson. They had 1 son.

Parliament of Great Britain
Preceded by Hon. Thomas Leslie	Member of Parliament for Dysart Burghs; 1741–1747	Succeeded by James St Clair
Preceded by David Scott	Member of Parliament for Fife; 1747–1754	Succeeded by James St Clair
Preceded by James St Clair	Member of Parliament for Dysart Burghs; 1754–1768	Succeeded by James Townsend Oswald
