= Lady Hope Anita Jane Ramsay =

- Born: Hope Anita Jane Macgregor; 1877
- Died: April 3, 1962 (aged 84–85); Bamff, Perthshire, Scotland
- Occupations: Aristocrat and charity-fundraiser

Lady Hope Anita Jane Ramsay (née MacGregor; 1877 – 3 April 1962) was a British aristocrat, charity fundraiser and land-owner.

== Early life and marriage ==
Hope Anita Jane Macgregor was born in 1877 to Euphemia Georgina Lindsay and her husband Colonel Alexander Donald MacGregor. Raised both in Edinburgh and at her parents’ home in Devon, Hope married James Douglas Ramsay (known to all by his middle name) in London in 1908.

Prior to the First World War the couple lived first in Canada and then in South Africa, where her husband managed a gold mine. After his war service with the Scottish Horse was concluded, they lived on the royal Balmoral Estate where her husband was the King’s Commissioner. Active members of the county set in Royal Deeside, Lady Ramsay was a vice president of the Deeside Field Club.

In 1926, on the death of her father-in-law Sir James Henry Ramsay, her husband inherited the Bamff Baronetcy, becoming the 11th Baron. Sir Douglas and Lady Hope and their sons Neis Alexander and David James moved into Bamff House shortly thereafter.

== Career ==
Over the coming decades the couple were firm fixtures in local and national social and political circles. Enjoying a familial relationship with the Royal Family, they were regular guests of the royal family at both Holyrood Palace and Balmoral and Lady Ramsay presented several young ladies to the new King and Queen on their first official visit to Edinburgh in 1937.

Bamff House was a popular resort for those who enjoyed shooting animals, the numbers of grouse being killed there each season sometimes receiving further national attention in print. The Ramsays were both active in the Scottish Unionist Party, Sir Douglas’s sister was Katharine Stewart-Murray, Duchess of Atholl, the Unionist MP for Kinross and West Perthshire from 1923 to 1938, and the couple were occasionally photographed in attendance at party meetings and Lady Ramsay was a speaker at a gathering of “women unionists” in Alyth in 1926.

Contemporary local and national newspapers regularly mention Lady Ramsay’s attendance at social gatherings across the country and her occasional duties opening charitable fetes and other activities on behalf of churches, the Scottish Women’s Institutes and other charitable organisations.

At a speech in 1930, while opening an Edinburgh fete in the Palais de Danse in aid of the Edinburgh Women’s Citizens’ Association, Lady Ramsay claimed that Rob Roy MacGregor was one of her ancestors. She went on to explain to attendees that she believed the role of women had changed significantly during her lifetime and with it their responsibilities as “the fate of the nation” now hung upon their votes.

In 1932 she is mentioned as one of the leading members of the Scottish Fine Arts and Print Club who formed a delegation to visit the Edinburgh City Chambers to meet the Lord Provost and discuss the city’s art collection.

In 1935, she joined the ruling council of the influential Edinburgh conservation body the Cockburn Association.

In 1938 she was charged with dangerous driving. In 1940, Lady Ramsay wrote a provocative letter from the couple’s Edinburgh home in Ann Street to the Scotsman, debating whether the German people were innately good or bad based in part upon her childhood experiences of being raised by a strict Prussian governess.

Her younger son David was married in 1939 and her elder son Neis was married in 1940. David was killed in a military action at Villons-les-Buissons shortly after D-Day for which he was awarded a posthumous Military Cross for gallantry.

Sir J. Douglas Ramsay died after a long illness on the 14 March 1959 and Lady Ramsay died of heart failure at home in Bamff House on 3 April 1962.
