= Banff =

Banff may refer to:

== Canada ==
- Banff, Alberta, a town in Alberta, Canada
  - Banff Airport
  - Banff station
  - Banff National Park
  - Banff Centre for Arts and Creativity
  - Banff (provincial electoral district) (1905–1909; 1975–1979)
  - Banff-Cochrane, another provincial electoral district
- Banff Formation, a stratigraphical unit of the Western Canadian Sedimentary Basin
- Banff (territorial electoral district) (1891–1905), Northwest Territories

== United Kingdom ==
- Banff, Aberdeenshire, former royal burgh in Aberdeenshire (formerly Banffshire), Scotland
  - Banff distillery, a distiller of malt whisky
  - Banffshire (County of Banff) a traditional county
  - Banffshire (UK Parliament constituency)
  - Banff (Parliament of Scotland constituency)
  - Banff and Buchan, a modern committee area in Aberdeenshire
  - Lord Banff, title in the Peerage of Scotland
  - Banff railway station (Scotland), a former (now closed) railway station
- Banff Bay, a coastal embayment in Scotland

== See also ==
- Banff Trail, Calgary, a neighbourhood of Calgary, Alberta, Canada
- Bamff, Perthshire, Scotland
- BAMF (disambiguation)
