= BAMF =

BAMF, or Bamf, may refer to:

- Bamf, the sound generated by the fictional Marvel Comics character Nightcrawler when teleporting
- Bundesamt für Migration und Flüchtlinge (Federal Office for Migration and Refugees), an agency of the Federal Ministry of the Interior in Germany
- The Blake, Alexa, Murphy Factor, a professional wrestling tag team

== See also ==
- Bamff, a family estate in Scotland
- Banff (disambiguation)
