= General St. Clair =

General St. Clair may refer to:

- Arthur St. Clair (1737–1818), American officer in American Revolutionary War who later served in the Ohio Territories
- James St Clair (1688–1762), Scottish soldier and Whig politician

== See also ==
- James St Clair-Erskine, 2nd Earl of Rosslyn (1762–1837), British Army general
