= Alexander Maitland (Scottish politician) =

Scottish politician (1674–1721)

Alexander Arbuthnot (afterwards Maitland) (baptized 17 June 1674 – June 1721) was appointed a Baron of the Court of Exchequer in Scotland after the Union of England and Scotland in 1707.

The son of Robert Arbuthnot, 2nd Viscount of Arbuthnott by his second wife Katherine Gordon, Alexander married Jean (d. 22 October 1746), eldest daughter of Sir Charles Maitland, Bt., of Pittrichie in Aberdeenshire, heiress to her brother Sir Charles Maitland, Bt. When the latter died in 1704, the couple thereby inherited the Pittrichie estate and Alexander assumed the surname and arms of Maitland.

He became a member of the Faculty of Advocates in 1697, and was Provost of Bervie and Commissioner to Parliament for the burgh of Inverbervie in 1702–1707. He was then selected as one of the 45 representatives for Scotland in the English Parliament following the Union in 1707 and served as a Baron of the Exchequer from 1708 until his death.

Their son and heir was Charles Maitland of Pittrichie, MP, who died unmarried at Edinburgh, 10 February 1751. Their three daughters also all died unmarried.

Parliament of Scotland
Preceded by William Beattie	Burgh Commissioner for Inverbervie; 1702–1707	Succeeded by Parliament of Great Britain
Parliament of Great Britain
Preceded by Parliament of Scotland	Member of Parliament for Scotland; 1707–1708; With: 44 others	Succeeded by John Gordon (as MP for Aberdeen Burghs)
