= Alexander Maitland =

Alexander Maitland may refer to:

- Alexander Maitland (Scottish politician) (1674 – 1721), Baron of the Court of Exchequer in Scotland and Member of Parliament
- Alexander Maitland (Michigan politician) (1844 – 1929), Lieutenant Governor of Michigan
- Sir Alexander Maitland, 1st Baronet (1728 – 1820), general in the British Army
