= James Farquhar (MP) =

Scottish politician

James Farquhar (1 August 1764 – September 1833) was a Scottish politician in the 19th century.

== Political career ==
In an 1802 by-election, he replaced Alexander Allardyce in Aberdeen Burghs in the first United Kingdom Parliament as an Independent. He was a supporter of the Liverpool ministry.

He lost his seat in the 1806 general election, but regained it at the 1807 general election. He was re-elected in 1812. He again lost his seat in the 1818 general election to Radical candidate Joseph Hume.

In 1824, he became Tory MP for Portarlington in Ireland where he sat until 1830.

Parliament of the United Kingdom
Preceded by Alexander Allardyce	Member of Parliament for Aberdeen Burghs; 1802–1806	Succeeded by John Ramsay
Preceded by John Ramsay	Member of Parliament for Aberdeen Burghs; 1806–1818	Succeeded by Joseph Hume
