= Brechin (Parliament of Scotland constituency) =

Constituency of the Old Parliament of Scotland

Brechin in Forfarshire was a burgh constituency that elected one commissioner to the Parliament of Scotland and to the Convention of Estates.

After the Acts of Union 1707, Brechin, Aberdeen, Arbroath, Inverbervie and Montrose formed the Aberdeen district of burghs, returning one member between them to the House of Commons of Great Britain.

== List of burgh commissioners ==
- 1661: George Steill, bailie
- 1665 convention: David Donaldson the elder, bailie
- 1667 convention: John Kinloch, merchant, bailie
- 1669–74: James Strachan
- 1678 convention, 1681–82: David Donaldson the younger, dean of guild
- 1685–86: Francis Mollyson, bailie
- 1689 convention, 1689–93: Henry Maule of Kellie (declared absent, 1693)
- 1693–1701, 1702–07: Francis Mollyson, dean of guild

== See also ==
- List of constituencies in the Parliament of Scotland at the time of the Union
