= John Ramsay (British Army officer) =

British army officer and Member of Parliament

Lieutenant General Hon John Ramsay (21 April 1775 - 28 June 1842) was a British army officer and briefly a Member of Parliament.

Ramsay was the fourth son of George Ramsay, 8th Earl of Dalhousie. His brother was William Maule.

He became an ensign by purchase in the 9th Regiment of Foot 1793, transferring to be a lieutenant in Captain Marlay's Independent Company of Foot later that year, and transferring to the 57th Regiment of Foot also in 1793. He became a captain in the 100th Regiment of Foot in 1794. He was wounded in 1799 at the Battle of Krabbendam

He was promoted to major in the regiment (now renumbered the 92nd) in 1803. On half-pay with the Clanalpine fencibles, he was appointed a lieutenant colonel in 1810, brevet Colonel in 1819 and to an unattached commission as lieutenant colonel in 1830. From 1831 to 1837, he was governor of Carlisle Castle under King William IV. He was colonel of the 79th Regiment of Foot (Cameron Highlanders) from 1841 until his death. He was appointed a lieutenant general in November 1841.

He served as Member of Parliament for Aberdeen Burghs from 1806 until 1807.

His son George succeeded his distant cousin in 1874 as the 12th Earl of Dalhousie

Parliament of the United Kingdom
| Preceded by James Farquhar | Member of Parliament for Aberdeen Burghs; 1806–1807 | Succeeded by James Farquhar |
