= Montrose (Parliament of Scotland constituency) =

Constituency of the Old Parliament of Scotland

Montrose in Forfarshire was a burgh constituency that elected one commissioner to the Parliament of Scotland and to the Convention of Estates.

At the time of the Acts of Union 1707, the commissioner for Montrose was chosen as one of the Scottish representatives to the first Parliament of Great Britain. From the 1708 British general election, Montrose, Aberdeen, Arbroath, Brechin and Inverbervie formed the Aberdeen district of burghs, returning one member between them to the House of Commons of Great Britain.

== List of burgh commissioners ==
- 1357: Richard of Cadyock and John Clerk
- 1367: Eliseus Falconer and Thomas Black
- 1504: George Stirling
- 1543: John Ogilvy
- 1563, 1567, 1568: John Erskine of Dun
- 1568: the provost of Montrose, James Mason (in the absence of the provost)
- 1569 convention: John Erskine of Dun
- 1578 convention: — Leighton
- 1579: George Petrie
- 1581: Robert Leighton
- 1583: James Mason
- 1587: Robert Leighton
- 1593: James Wishart
- 1597 convention: William Murray
- 1612: Patrick Leighton
- 1615–16: James Mill
- 1617 convention, 1617, 1621: William Ramsay
- 1625 convention, 1628–33: Robert Keith
- 1630 convention: Patrick Leighton
- 1639–40: Robert Keith
- 1643–44 convention: Andrew Gray
- 1644: Robert Beattie
- 1645: Robert Tailyour
- 1645–47, 1648: James Pedie
- 1649: Andrew Gray or James Milne
- 1651: Walter Lyell
- 1661: John Ronnald
- 1665 convention, 1667 convention, 1669–74, 1678 convention: Robert Tailyour
- 1681–82: Robert Rennald
- 1685–86: James Mill, merchant, bailie
- 1689 (convention), 1689–1702: James Mudie
- 1702–7: James Scott of Logie

== See also ==
- List of constituencies in the Parliament of Scotland at the time of the Union
