= Arbroath (Parliament of Scotland constituency) =

Constituency of the Old Parliament of Scotland

Arbroath in Forfarshire was a burgh constituency that elected one commissioner to the Parliament of Scotland and to the Convention of Estates.

After the Acts of Union 1707, Arbroath, Aberdeen, Brechin, Inverbervie and Montrose formed the Aberdeen district of burghs, returning one member between them to the House of Commons of Great Britain.

== List of burgh commissioners ==
- 1661–63: John Ochterlony, provost
- 1667 convention, 1669–74: Henry Fithie, merchant, provost
- 1678 convention, 1681–82, 1685–86: John Kidd, bailie
- 1689 convention, 1689–1702: Patrick Stiven
- 1702–07: John Hutchison, provost

== See also ==
- List of constituencies in the Parliament of Scotland at the time of the Union
