= Kirkcaldy (Parliament of Scotland constituency) =

Constituency of the Old Parliament of Scotland in Fife, Scotland

Kirkcaldy in Fife was a royal burgh that returned one commissioner to the Parliament of Scotland and to the Convention of Estates. It was represented in Parliament from at least 1571 until 1707.

After the Acts of Union 1707, Kirkcaldy, Burntisland, Dysart and Kinghorn formed the Dysart district of burghs, returning one member between them to the House of Commons of Great Britain.

By the Scottish Reform Act 1832 Dysart Burghs was renamed Kirkcaldy Burghs with the same group of burghs. However, now the M.P. was directly elected by the combined householders (meeting the property qualification) of the four burghs, instead of by a meeting of the four representatives of the burgh councils. Kirkcaldy dominated the reformed constituency, thus effectively reinstating Kirkcaldy as a constituency in Parliament, a position which persists to the present day and Kirkcaldy is a constituency of the restored Scottish Parliament.

== List of burgh commissioners ==
- 1571: William Lamb and John Halkett.
- 1578: James Littlejohn and John Lowdoun.
- 1681: Alexander Dalzell.
- 1583: John Halkett (afterwards Sir).
- 1584: John Halkett and Alexander Dalzell.
- 1585: Robert Hay and Patrick Hogg.
- 1686: Alexander Dalzell.
- 1592: Robert Hay and Michael Kirkcaldy.
- 1594: Patrick Hogg and William Hay.
- 1597: Michael Kirkcaldy and William Halkheid.
- 1599: John Halkett.
- 1600: Alexander Dalzell.
- 1601: David Hutcheson and John Halkett
- 1604: John Lowdon.
- 1612: Thomas Lamb.
- 16.8, 1639, 1648: John Williamson.
- 1644: James Law.
- 1645, 1650, 1685: Robert White of Purin.
- 1649: James Robertson
- 1661–63: John Williamson the elder, bailie
- 1681: John Williamson.
- 1667: Henry Boswell, bailie.
- 1669: John White of Collistoan.
- 1672: David Pearson.
- 1678 (convention): Mathew Anderson, provost
- 1681–82: John Williamson the elder, former bailie
- 1685–86: Mathew Anderson the elder of Ridburne, provost
- 1689–1702: John Boswell, bailie and dean of guild
- 1702–07: James Oswald, dean of guild

== See also ==
- List of constituencies in the Parliament of Scotland at the time of the Union
