= Robert Scott (1705–1780) =

Robert Scott (1705 – 27 December 1780) of Dunninald in Forfarshire was a Scottish politician who sat in the House of Commons briefly from 1733 to 1734.

Scott was the second son of Patrick Scott of Rossie, Dunninald and Usan and his wife Margaret Hope, daughter of Sir Archibald Hope of Rankeillour, Fife, Lord of session (Lord Rankeillour). He was trained as an advocate in 1726.

Scott was elected at a by-election on 1 March 1733 as the Member of Parliament (MP) for Forfarshire, in the place of his deceased relative James Scott of Logie. He voted with the Government on the Excise Bill in 1733. At the 1734 British general election he was defeated by Thomas Lyon (later Earl of Strathmore). When Lyon succeeded to the peerage in 1735, Scott was defeated again at the subsequent by-election.

Scott married Anne Middleton, daughter of John Middleton of Seaton, Aberdeen in 1740. He died on 27 December 1780, leaving two sons and a daughter.

Parliament of Great Britain
Preceded by James Scott	Member of Parliament for Forfarshire; 1733–1734	Succeeded by Thomas Lyon
