= John Middleton (British Army officer) =

British politician and Member of Parliament from 1713 to 1739

Brigadier-General John Middleton MP
- Born: 1678
- Died: 4 May 1739 (aged 60–61) London, England

Brigadier-General John Middleton (1678 – 4 May 1739) was a British Army officer and Scottish Whig politician who sat in the House of Commons almost continuously between 1713 and 1739.

== Early life ==
He was baptised in Aberdeen on the 27th of September 1678.

Middleton was the fourth (but first surviving) son and sixth child of Rev Prof George Middleton DD (1645-1726) and Janet or Jane Gordon, daughter of James Gordon of Seaton. He was grandson of Alexander Middleton (younger brother of John Middleton, 1st Earl of Middleton) and Margaret Gordon. Both Alexander and George Middleton served as Principal of King's College, Aberdeen. John's younger brother, Robert, was father of Charles Middleton, 1st Baron Barham. In about 1712, John Middleton married Elizabeth Cunningham, daughter of William Cunningham of Enterkin, Ayr.

== Military career ==
Middleton obtained a commission in the Army in the reign of King William III, and was promoted to the rank of captain in 1706. He served in Spain in the War of the Spanish Succession, and also on board the fleet, where his company was employed as marines. He was many years an officer in the 25th Regiment of Foot, in which corps he rose to the rank of lieutenant-colonel, and he was promoted to the rank of colonel in 1711. He commanded the 25th Regiment in Scotland under the Duke of Argyll during the rebellion of the Earl of Mar, and in 1721 he was rewarded with the colonelcy of that corps. He commanded the 25th until 29 May 1732, when he was removed to the 13th Regiment of Foot. He was promoted to the rank of brigadier-general in 1735.

== Political career ==
Middleton was closely attached to the Duke of Argyll from 1709 or before and followed the Duke's political affiliations. He was elected Member of Parliament (MP) for Aberdeen Burghs at the 1713 general election. At the 1715 general election he was defeated at the poll, but petitioned and was seated as Whig MP for Aberdeen Burghs on 22 July 1715. In 1717 he followed the Duke of Argyll into opposition and two years later followed him back to the government side. At the 1722 general election he was again defeated at the poll at Aberdeen and then seated on petition on 25 October 1722. He was returned unopposed in the general elections of 1727 and 1734 and remained MP until his death in 1739.

Middleton died in London of a "mortification of the bowels" on 4 May 1739, and was buried in Westminster (Abbey?). He left two sons and five daughters.

Parliament of Great Britain
Preceded by William Livingston	Member of Parliament for Aberdeen Burghs; 1713 – February 1715	Succeeded by James Erskine
Preceded by James Erskine	Member of Parliament for Aberdeen Burghs; July 1715 – April 1722	Succeeded by William Kerr
Preceded by William Kerr	Member of Parliament for Aberdeen Burghs; October 1722 – 1739	Succeeded by John Maule
Military offices
Preceded by The Viscount Shannon	Colonel of John Middleton's (Edinburgh) Regiment of Foot; 1721–1732	Succeeded by The Earl of Rothes
Preceded by Lord Mark Kerr	Colonel of John Middleton's Regiment of Foot; 1732–1739	Succeeded by Harry Pulteney
