= James Ramsey =

James Ramsey may refer to:

- James Ramsey (politician) (1864–1939), provincial politician and businessman from Alberta, Canada
- James B. Ramsey (born 1937), Canadian econometrician
- James E. Ramsey (1931–2013), American politician and lawyer
- James R. Ramsey (born 1948), president of the University of Louisville (2002–2016)
- James Ramsey (baseball) (born 1989), American baseball player

== See also ==
- James Ramsay (disambiguation)
