= Kinghorn (Parliament of Scotland constituency) =

Constituency of the Old Parliament of Scotland in Fife, Scotland

Kinghorn in Fife was a royal burgh that returned one commissioner to the Parliament of Scotland and to the Convention of Estates.

After the Acts of Union 1707, Kinghorn, Burntisland, Dysart and Kirkcaldy formed the Dysart district of burghs, returning one member between them to the House of Commons of Great Britain.

== List of burgh commissioners ==
- 1661: Robert Cunningham, bailie
- 1665 convention: not represented
- 1667 convention: James Wood
- 1678 (convention): John Bruce of Wester Abden, bailie
- 1681–82, 1685–1686: Robert Bruce, merchant, bailie
- 1689 (convention), 1689–1702: Patrick Wallace, bailie
- 1702–1705: James Melvill of Halhill (died c.1705)
- 1706-1707: Patrick Moncreiff

== See also ==
- List of constituencies in the Parliament of Scotland at the time of the Union
