= William Livingston (British politician) =

British politician

Member of Parliament for Aberdeen Burghs
- In office 8 February 1711 – 1713
- Preceded by: James Scott
- Succeeded by: John Middleton

William Livingston (c. 1650 – after 1713) was a British politician.

He was elected to Parliament as Member of Parliament (MP) for Aberdeen Burghs in a by-election on 8 February 1711. He remained the constituency's MP until the 1713 general election.

Parliament of Great Britain
Preceded by James Scott	Member of Parliament for Aberdeen Burghs; 1711–1713	Succeeded by John Middleton
