= David Scott (of Scotstarvit) =

Scottish Member of Parliament

David Scott (1689 – 1 December 1766), of Scotstarvit, was a Scottish Member of Parliament. He was the son of David Scott of Scotstarvit (died 1718).

== Biography ==
Scott was returned to Fife in 1741, and held that seat for a decade. In 1751, he was returned to Aberdeen, for which he sat until his death. By his wife Lucy, daughter of Sir Robert Gordon, he had several children, including:

- David Scott of Scotstarvit, eldest son and heir, died without issue
- Maj-Gen. John Scott (British Army officer) (died. 1776)
- Marjory, who married David Murray, 5th Viscount of Stormont

== Notes ==
Parliament of Great Britain
Preceded by Sir John Anstruther, Bt	Member of Parliament for Fife; 1741–1751	Succeeded by James Oswald
Preceded by Charles Maitland	Member of Parliament for Aberdeen Burghs; 1751–1766	Succeeded by Sir John Lindsay
