= Patrick Moncreiff =

Scottish politician

Patrick Moncreiff (c.1674–1709), of Reidie and Myres Castle, Fife, was a Scottish politician who sat in the Parliament of Scotland from 1706 to 1707 and in the British House of Commons from 1707 to 1709.

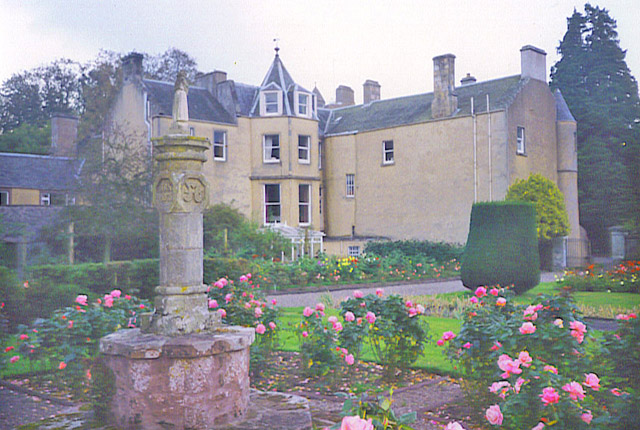
Garden of Myres Castle

Moncreiff was the second, but eldest surviving son of George Moncreiff, of Reidie and Myres Castle and his wife Margaret Leslie, daughter of John Leslie of Myres Castle. In 1694, he became a lieutenant in Lord John Murray’s newly formed regiment of Foot and was then captain from 1695 until the regiment was disbanded in 1697. He studied at Leyden in 1698, aged 24. He returned to Scotland, and was admitted as an advocate in 1701. He became a Burgess of Edinburgh in 1702 and on 1 March 1702, married Anna or Agnes Skene, widow of James Skene of Grange and Kirkcaldy, Fife, and daughter of John Drummond of Cultmalundie, Perth. She died before 7 April 1720.

Moncreiff was returned to the Scottish parliament as Burgh Commissioner for Kinghorn on 18 June 1706. He supported the Court over the Union and was said to be under the influence of the Earl of Leven. Moncreiff was a courtier and on that basis was selected as one of the Scottish representatives to the first Parliament of Great Britain in 1707. He spoke on behalf of the Court in the debates on the abolition of the Scottish privy council in December 1707, and was complimented on the quality of his speeches. In March 1708 he became a captain and lieutenant-colonel in the Scots Foot Guards.

At the 1708 British general election, Moncreiff was returned in a fierce contest as Member of Parliament for Fife.

Moncreiff died in London on or shortly before 20 January 1709 leaving a son and daughter.

Parliament of Scotland
Unknown	Burgh Commissioner for Kinghorn; 1706–1707	Parliament of Scotland abolished
Parliament of Great Britain
New parliament	Member of Parliament for Scotland; 1707–1708	Constituency split
New constituency	Member of Parliament for Fife; 1708–1709	Succeeded by Robert Anstruther
