= James Scott (1671–1732) =

Scottish politician, died 1732

Burgh Commissioner for Montrose
- In office 1702–1707
- Preceded by: James Mudie
- Succeeded by: Parliament of Great Britain

Member of Parliament for Scotland
- In office 1707–1708
- Preceded by: Parliament of Scotland
- Succeeded by: John Gordon (as MP for Aberdeen Burghs)

Member of Parliament for Aberdeen Burghs
- In office 1710–1711
- Preceded by: John Gordon
- Succeeded by: William Livingston

Member of Parliament for Forfarshire
- In office 1716–1732
- Preceded by: John Carnegie
- Succeeded by: Robert Scott

Personal details
- Born: 1671
- Died: October 1732

James Scott (1671 – October 1732) of Logie and Castlested, Forfar was a Scottish politician who sat in the Parliament of Scotland from 1702 to 1707 and in the British House of Commons between 1707 and 1732.

Scott was the eldest son of James Scott, of Logie, and his wife Agnes Falconer, daughter of Sir Alexander Falconer, 1st Baronet, of Glenfarquhar, Kincardine. His father was Shire Commissioner for Forfarshire in the Parliament of Scotland from 1693. Scott made a marriage contract with Isabella Bannerman, daughter of Sir Alexander Bannerman, 2nd Baronet, of Elsick, Kincardine, on 3 November 1692.

Scott was a Shire Commissioner for Forfarshire from 1698 to 1702. He was appointed Joint Master of works for Scotland in 1700 and Commissioner Justiciary for the Highlands in 1701 and 1702. He was then a Burgh Commissioner for Montrose from 1702 to 1707. After the Union in 1707, he sat as a Member of Parliament, representing Scotland in the first Parliament of Great Britain. At the 1708 general election he stood for Aberdeen Burghs but was unsuccessful. He became provost of Montrose in 1710 and was elected MP for Aberdeen Burghs at the 1710 general election but was unseated on petition on 8 February 1711. In July 1712 he took part in a violent protest against the provincial synod, and publicly burnt the act of proclamation at the market cross in Montrose. However, he did not stand at the next two general elections.

Following the 1715 Jacobite Rebellion, several Forfarshire families who took part lost their estates and political influence, and the sitting MP for the county was expelled from parliament. Scott, who was a government supporter, was returned unopposed as MP for Forfarshire at the resulting by-election on 30 July 1716. He was provost of Montrose again in 1722 and was returned unopposed at the 1722 general election. In 1725, he was attacked by the mob at Dundee who accused him of being party to the malt tax bill and was only rescued by soldiers who happened to be at hand. He was elected for Forfarshire again at the 1727 general election but the only time he was present to vote was with the Government on the Hessians in 1730.

Scott died in October 1732, aged 61. He and his wife had three sons James, Alexander and John, and six daughters Margaret, Katherine, Isabella, Helen, Mary and Elizabeth. His sons had no children and the estate of Logie passed to his daughter Margaret, who married Alexander Mill.

Parliament of Scotland
Preceded by James Mudie	Burgh Commissioner for Montrose; 1702–1707	Succeeded by Parliament of Great Britain
Parliament of Great Britain
Preceded by Parliament of Scotland	Member of Parliament for Scotland; 1707–1708; With: 44 others	Succeeded by John Gordon (as MP for Aberdeen Burghs)
Preceded by John Gordon	Member of Parliament for Aberdeen Burghs; 1710–1711	Succeeded by William Livingston
Preceded by John Carnegie	Member of Parliament for Forfarshire; 1716–1732	Succeeded by Robert Scott
