= Dysart (Parliament of Scotland constituency) =

Constituency of the Old Parliament of Scotland

Dysart in Fife was a royal burgh that returned one commissioner to the Parliament of Scotland and to the Convention of Estates.

After the Acts of Union 1707, Dysart, Burntisland, Kinghorn and Kirkcaldy formed the Dysart district of burghs, returning one member between them to the House of Commons of Great Britain.

== List of burgh commissioners ==
- 1661–63, 1665 convention: David Symson, councillor
- 1667 convention: William Symson, bailie
- 1669–74: Henry Beattie, bailie
- 1678 convention: George Symson
- 1681–82: John Reddie the younger, merchant, bailie
- 1685–86, 1689 convention, 1689–90; David Chrystie
- 1695–1702: Alexander Swinton
- 1702–03: David Chrystie of Balsillie (died c.1702)
- 1703–04: George Essone, merchant (died c.1705)
- 1704–07: John Black, bailie

== See also ==
- List of constituencies in the Parliament of Scotland at the time of the Union
