= John St Clair, Master of Sinclair =

Scottish Army officer and Tory politician

John St Clair, Master of Sinclair (5 December 1683 – 2 November 1750) was a Scottish Army officer and Tory politician who sat briefly in the British House of Commons in 1708 before he was excluded as ineligible as eldest son of a Scottish peer. He was court-martialled and under sentence of death for the killing of two fellow officers before he escaped to serve in the Prussian army and was subsequently pardoned. He then took part as a rebel in the Jacobite Rising of 1715 and was attainted and excluded in succession to his father's property. He wrote a personal memoir of the Rising and returned to Scotland after ten years in France and the Low Countries.

== Early life ==
St Clair was the elder son of Henry St Clair, 10th Lord Sinclair and his wife Grizel Cockburn, eldest daughter of Sir James Cockburn, 1st Baronet. He was educated at the University of Franeker. At the beginning of 1708 he became a captain and lieutenant in Col. George Preston's regiment. In September 1708, he fought a duel with an ensign from his own regiment, Hugh Schaw who had accused him of cowardice and mortally wounded Schaw. Schaw's brother Captain Alexander Schaw claimed Sinclair had used padding to protect his chest during the duel, whereupon Sinclair also shot Captain Schaw. There had been no seconds present at either encounter and Sinclair was court-marshalled and put under sentence of death on 17 October 1708.

== Career ==
Meanwhile, St Clair, was returned on his father's interest as Member of Parliament for Dysart Burghs at the 1708 British general election in May. He was unseated on 3 December 1708, primarily because he was ineligible as the eldest son of a Scottish peer, although his death sentence would also have unseated him. Sinclair avoided punishment by escaping from camp with the connivance of the John Churchill, 1st Duke of Marlborough who arranged his enlistment in the service of King Frederick I of Prussia where he served for the rest of the war.

== Jacobite rebellion ==
In 1712 St Clair received a pardon from Queen Anne through the intercession of the Duke of Hamilton. He returned to Dysart, where he tried to keep aloof from party politics, but was drawn into Jacobite plotting. In 1715, he supported the Jacobite rising and achieved some success in a raid on Burntisland on 2 October. However he was criticized for failure to take advantage of an attack in the Battle of Sheriffmuir in November 1715. A critic of the Earl of Mar's leadership, he left the Jacobite headquarters at Perth shortly after the battle, following Alexander Gordon, Marquess of Huntly, northwards before fleeing to Kirkwall Castle and from there to the continent. His Memoir of the Insurrection in Scotland in 1715 was probably written in France early in 1716, but was not published until 1858.

St Clair was attainted and excluded from succession to his father's lordship. He did not return to Scotland for ten years, mainly on account of the hostility of the third of the Schaw brothers, John Schaw MP. He was finally pardoned by letters patent in 1726 but the attainder was left in force.

== Later life ==
On 16 August 1733, St Clair married Lady Margaret Stewart, daughter of James Stewart, 5th Earl of Galloway and widow of James Carnegie, 5th Earl of Southesk. An act of parliament in 1736 relieved the terms of St Clair's forfeiture's terms, but he never assumed his title. His wife died in 1747 and he married as his second wife, Amelia Murray, daughter of Lieutenant-General Lord George Murray at Arnhall on 24 April 1750.

Sinclair died at Dysart on 2 November 1750, Both his marriages were childless. He was succeeded in his title by his younger brother James, a general in the British Army and Member of Parliament for forty years.

Parliament of Great Britain
| New constituency | Member of Parliament for Dysart Burghs; 1708–1710 | Succeeded by James Abercromby |
Peerage of Scotland
| Preceded by Henry St Clair | Lord Sinclair de jure 1726–1750 | Succeeded by James St Clair |
