= Dysart Burghs (UK Parliament constituency) =

Parliamentary constituency in the United Kingdom, 1801–1832

- Former district of burghs constituency for the House of Commons
- Major settlements: Burntisland, Dysart, Kinghorn, Kirkcaldy

1708–1832
- Seats: One
- Created from: Burntisland, Dysart, Kinghorn, Kirkcaldy
- Replaced by: Kirkcaldy Burghs

Dysart Burghs was a district of burghs constituency of the House of Commons of Great Britain (at Westminster) from 1708 to 1801 and of the House of Commons of the United Kingdom (also at Westminster) from 1801 to 1832. It elected one Member of Parliament (MP).

== Creation ==
The British parliamentary constituency was created in 1708 following the Acts of Union, 1707 and replaced the former Parliament of Scotland burgh constituencies of Burntisland, Dysart, Kinghorn and Kirkcaldy.

== Boundaries ==
The constituency consisted of the burghs of Burntisland, Dysart, Kinghorn and Kirkcaldy, all in the county of Fife. It had just four voters, the commissioners elected by the four burgh councils. The place of election rotated between the burghs and the host burgh had a casting vote if there was a tie.

== History ==
The constituency elected one Member of Parliament (MP) by the first past the post system until 1832.

For the 1832 general election, under the Representation of the People (Scotland) Act 1832, the constituency was renamed Kirkcaldy Burghs, the boundaries of the burghs for parliamentary purposes ceased to be those for other purposes, and the voting system was changed.

== Members of Parliament ==
First Elected	Name	Party	Notes
26 May 1708	Hon. John Sinclair		Disqualified
16 Jan 1710	James Abercrombie		By-election
31 Oct 1710	James Oswald		Died 1716
17 Feb 1715	William Kerr		
14 Apr 1722	James St Clair		Double return with Thomas Leslie. Declared elected 27 Oct. 1722.
20 May 1734	Hon. Thomas Leslie		
02 Jun 1741	James Oswald		(1715–1769)
23 Jul 1747	James St Clair		
11 May 1754	James Oswald		(1715–1769)
11 Apr 1768	James Townsend Oswald		
01 Nov 1774	John Johnstone		
03 Oct 1780	Sir John Henderson		
26 Apr 1784	Sir Charles Preston, Bt		
12 Jul 1790	Hon. Charles Hope		
21 Jun 1796	Sir James St Clair-Erskine		Became the 2nd Earl of Rosslyn
04 Mar 1805	Sir Robert Dallas		By-election
25 Nov 1806	Sir Ronald Crauford Ferguson	Whig	
12 Aug 1830	Lord Loughborough	Tory	Later the 3rd Earl of Rosslyn
26 May 1831	Robert Ferguson	Whig	(re-elected for Kirkcaldy Burghs in 1832)

== Elections ==
The first election in Dysart Burghs was in 1708. In 1707–08, members of the 1702–1707 Parliament of Scotland were co-opted to serve in the 1st Parliament of Great Britain. See Scottish representatives to the 1st Parliament of Great Britain for further details.

The most populous of the burghs was Kirkcaldy. The Oswald family became the dominant force in Kirkcaldy politics in the 18th century.

The second largest burgh was Dysart, controlled by the St. Clair interest.

Burntisland and Kinghorn were smaller. The votes from these burghs seem to have been available to the highest bidder.

The combined Oswald and St. Clair influence often decided who was to be elected, but in 1774 a rich outsider bribed his way into Parliament, to the surprise of the incumbent J.T. Oswald.

The most prominent political figure, during the time he represented the constituency, was the second James Oswald. He was seen as a reliable man of business and held a number of junior ministerial offices. At one point he was even being thought of as a possible Chancellor of the Exchequer, but being Scottish counted against Oswald. The Prime Minister, the Earl of Bute was extremely unpopular with English opinion in the early 1760s, so promoting another Scot was thought too risky.

Sir James St.Clair-Erskine (MP 1796–1805) was more important later in his career when in 1834–35, as 2nd Earl of Rosslyn, he served as Lord President of the Council.

- 1708 (26 May) general election (election at Dysart)
- Hon. John Sinclair: Unopposed
- Declared incapable of being elected, being the eldest son of Lord Sinclair
- 1710 (16 January) by-election (election at Dysart)
- James Abercromby possibly defeated William Patterson, no vote totals available (see note below)
- 1710 (31 October) general election (election at Kirkcaldy)
- James Oswald: Unopposed
- 1713 general election (election at Burntisland)
- James Oswald: Unopposed
- 1715 (17 February) general election (election at Kinghorn)
- William Kerr: Unopposed
- 1722 (14 April) general election (election at Dysart)
- Thomas Leslie defeated James St Clair, no vote totals available. On petition St.Clair was awarded the seat.
- 1727 general election (election at Kirkcaldy)
- James St Clair: Unopposed
- 1734 (20 May) general election (election at Burntisland)
- Hon. Thomas Leslie defeated James St Clair, no vote totals available.
- 1741 (2 June) general election (election at Kinghorn)
- James Oswald: Unopposed
- Appointed a Commissioner of the Admiralty
- 1745 (January) by-election (election at Kinghorn)
- James Oswald: Unopposed
- 1747 (23 July) general election (election at Dysart)
- James St Clair: Unopposed
- 1754 (11 May) general election (election at Kirkcaldy)
- James Oswald: Unopposed
- Appointed a Commissioner of the Treasury
- 1760 (18 January) by-election (election at Kirkcaldy)
- James Oswald: Unopposed
- 1761 (20 April) general election (election at Burntisland)
- James Oswald: Unopposed
- Appointed a Vice Treasurer of Ireland
- 1763 (18 May) by-election (election at Burntisland)
- James Oswald: Unopposed
- 1768 (11 April) general election (election at Kinghorn)
- James Townshend Oswald: Unopposed
- Appointed Secretary for the Leeward Islands
- 1772 (28 February) by-election (election at Kinghorn)
- James Townshend Oswald: Unopposed
- 1774 (1 November) general election (election at Dysart)
- John Johnstone: 3 votes (Burntisland, Dysart and Kinghorn)
- James Townshend Oswald: 1 vote (Kirkcaldy)
- 1780 (3 October) general election (election at Kirkcaldy)
- John Henderson: 2 votes (Burntisland and Kirkcaldy)
- John Johnstone: 2 votes (Dysart and Kinghorn)
- Kirkcaldy used its casting vote to elect Henderson
- 1784 (26 April) general election (election at Burntisland)
- Sir Charles Preston: Unopposed
- 1790 (12 July) general election (election at Kinghorn)
- Hon. Charles Hope: 2 votes
- John Crauford: 2 votes
- Kinghorn used its casting vote to elect Hope
- 1796 (21 June) general election (election at Dysart)
- Sir James St Clair-Erskine, Bt: Unopposed
- 1802 general election (election at Kirkcaldy)
- Sir James St Clair-Erskine, Bt: Unopposed
- Succeeded to the Peerage as Earl of Rosslyn
- 1805 (4 March) by-election (election at Kirkcaldy)
- Robert M. Dallas: Unopposed
- 1806 (25 November) general election (election at Burntisland)
- Ronald Crauford Ferguson (Whig): Unopposed
- 1807 general election (election at Kinghorn)
- Ronald Crauford Ferguson (Whig): Unopposed
- 1812 general election (election at Dysart)
- Ronald Crauford Ferguson (Whig) 3 votes
- P.C.C.H. Durham (Tory) 1 vote
- 1818 general election (election at Kirkcaldy)
- Sir Ronald Crauford Ferguson (Whig): Unopposed
- 1820 general election (election at Burntisland)
- Sir Ronald Crauford Ferguson (Whig): Unopposed
- 1826 general election (election at Kinghorn)
- Sir Ronald Crauford Ferguson (Whig): Unopposed
- 1830 (23 August) general election (election at Dysart)
- Lord Loughborough (Tory): Unopposed
- 1831 (26 May) general election (election at Kirkcaldy)
- Robert Ferguson (Whig): Unopposed

Note: Stooks Smith refers to a by-election in December 1709, won by Patterson but does not mention Abercromby. Leigh Rayment's site does not mention Patterson, but has James Abercromby as MP from 16 January 1710. Possibly there was an undocumented contested election.
