= Sir James Abercrombie, 1st Baronet =

British Army officer and Scottish Whig politician

Escutcheon of the Abercrombie baronets

Sir James Abercrombie, 1st Baronet (c. 1680 – 14 November 1724), of Edinburgh, was a British Army officer and Scottish Whig politician who sat in the House of Commons of Great Britain in 1710.

Abercrombie was the illegitimate son of James Hamilton, 4th Duke of Hamilton. He joined the Royal Scots as an ensign on 24 May 1696, and fought in the Battle of Blenheim in 1704 as Aide-de-Camp to George Douglas-Hamilton, 1st Earl of Orkney. He became brevet major in 1706 and captain on 31 May 1707. He was created baronet on 21 May 1709. He subsequently served as a captain and lieutenant-colonel in the Coldstream Guards from 1710 to 1711.

Abercrombie was returned unopposed as Member of Parliament (MP) for Dysart Burghs at a by-election on 16 January 1710 and held the seat until the dissolution of parliament on 21 September 1710. He chose not to stand for re-election, and his successor as the member for Dysart Burghs, James Oswald, was elected unopposed at the 1710 British general election.

Abercrombie became lieutenant-colonel on 20 March 1711 and brevet colonel on 1 November 1711. On 24 October 1712, he became Town Major (Lieutenant-Governor) of Dunkirk and as such, oversaw the evacuation of French forces and the installation of an allied garrison, holding the post for the rest of his life. He was commissioner for inspecting the demolition of Dunkirk fortifications from 1713 to 1716, accumulating extensive arrears of pay and allowance. He spent some time chasing what he was owed, and had to sell his regiment to make ends meet.

Abercrombie was probably unmarried and died without surviving male issue at his home in Charing Cross on 14 November 1724. The baronetcy became extinct on his death.

Parliament of Great Britain
Preceded by Hon. John Sinclair	Member of Parliament for Dysart Burghs; 1710	Succeeded by James Oswald
Baronetage of Great Britain
New creation	Baronet (of Edinburgh); 1709–1724	Extinct
Preceded by De Neufville baronets	Abercrombie baronets of Edinburgh; 21 May 1709	Succeeded by Elwill baronets
