= John Maule (MP) =

Scottish Whig politician

John Maule (1706 – 2 July 1781), of Inverkeilor, Forfarshire, was a Scottish Whig politician who sat in the British House of Commons from 1739 to 1748.

Maule was the second surviving son of Harry Maule, of Kellie, Forfar and his second wife Anne Lindsay, daughter of Patrick Lindsay of Kilbirnie, Ayrshire. His father was shire commissioner in the Parliament of Scotland. He was half brother to William Maule, 1st Earl Panmure.

Maule was secretary to Lord Ilay, later Duke of Argyll, who was manager of elections in Scotland for Walpole and the Pelhams. In 1737 Maule was appointed Keeper of Register of Sasines. He was returned unopposed as Member of Parliament for Aberdeen Burghs at a by election on 8 June 1739 and supported the administration. He was elected again at the 1741 British general election but at the time of the second Jacobite rebellion of 1745 came under suspicion of being a Jacobite because of his ancestry. However he was classed as 'Old Whig' in 1746 and was returned unopposed at the 1747 British general election. He resigned his seat a year later in 1748 when he was appointed Baron of the Scottish Exchequer

Maule died unmarried on 2 July 1781.

== Notes ==
- Simpson, John M. "Maule, John". Oxford Dictionary of National Biography (online ed.). Oxford University Press. doi:10.1093/ref:odnb/64085. (Subscription or UK public library membership required.)

Parliament of Great Britain
| Preceded by John Middleton | Member of Parliament for Aberdeen Burghs; 1739–1748 | Succeeded by Charles Maitland |
