= Aberdeen (Parliament of Scotland constituency) =

Constituency of the Old Parliament of Scotland

Aberdeen was a burgh constituency that elected one commissioner to the Parliament of Scotland and to the Convention of Estates.

After the Acts of Union 1707, Aberdeen, Arbroath, Brechin, Inverbervie and Montrose formed the Aberdeen district of burghs, returning one member between them to the House of Commons of Great Britain.

== List of burgh commissioners ==
- 1661–62: William Gray, provost (died 1662)
- 1663: Gilbert Gray of Saphok
- 1665 (convention),1669–74: Sir Robert Patrie of Portlethine, provost
- 1667 (convention): Alexander Alexander, bailie
- 1681–82, 1685–86: Sir George Skene of Fintray, provost
- 1689 (convention), 1689–90: Alexander Gordon, provost (died c.1690)
- 1693: Walter Cochrane of Dumbreck, provost
- 1694–1702: Robert Cruickshank of Banchorie, provost
- 1702–07: John Allerdes, provost

== See also ==
- List of constituencies in the Parliament of Scotland at the time of the Union
