= William Kerr (British Army officer, died 1741) =

British politician

William Kerr (died 17 January 1741) was a British Army officer and Scottish politician who sat in the British House of Commons between 1710 and 1727.

Kerr was born before 1682, the third son of Robert Ker, 3rd Earl of Roxburghe, and his wife Lady Margaret Hay, daughter of John Hay, 1st Marquess of Tweeddale. In 1704 and 1705, he travelled abroad in Holland, Switzerland, Italy, Germany and Austria. He served with reputation on the Continent under John Churchill, 1st Duke of Marlborough. In 1709, he was rewarded with the command of a regiment of dragoons (The Queen's Own Regiment of Dragoons, later the 7th Hussars). He highly distinguished himself at the Battle of Sheriffmuir on 13 November 1715, where, according to contemporary accounts, he had three horses killed under him, was wounded in the thigh, and had his coat torn by a pistol bullet. The care and attention which he paid to the interests of his corps procured him the affection and esteem of the officers and soldiers.

Kerr stood unsuccessfully for Roxburghshire at the 1708 general election. At the 1710 general election, he was returned unopposed as Member of Parliament for Berwick-upon-Tweed. He did not stand at the 1713 general election. On the accession of King George I he came to favour and was appointed groom of the bedchamber to the Prince of Wales. At the 1715 general election, he was elected as Whig MP for Dysart Burghs on the interest of Lord Rothes and voted consistently with the Administration.

He was ordered to Scotland to counter the Jacobite rebellion in September 1715 as colonel of his reformed regiment, renamed the Princess of Wales's Own Regiment of Dragoons. At the 1722 general election he was elected in the poll for Aberdeen Burghs, but was unseated on petition on 25 October 1722. He was returned as MP for Berwick at a by-election on 7 May 1723. He was appointed Governor of Blackness Castle in 1723 and held the post for the rest of his life. He did not stand at the 1727 general election.

Kerr's military career prospered and he was promoted to the rank of brigadier-general in 1727, to that of major-general in 1735, and to that of lieutenant-general in 1739.

Kerr died unmarried on 17 January 1741. At the time of his death he had commanded his regiment nearly thirty-two years. He was the brother of John Ker, 1st Duke of Roxburghe.

Parliament of Great Britain
| Preceded by Samuel Ogle; Jonathan Hutchinson | Member of Parliament for Berwick-upon-Tweed; 1710–1713; With: Jonathan Hutchinson 1710–1711; Richard Hampden 1711–1713 | Succeeded by Richard Hampden; William Orde |
| Preceded by James Oswald | Member of Parliament for Dysart Burghs; 1715–1722 | Succeeded by James St Clair |
| Preceded by John Middleton | Member of Parliament for Aberdeen Burghs; 1722 | Succeeded by John Middleton |
| Preceded by Grey Neville; Henry Grey | Member of Parliament for Berwick-upon-Tweed; 1723–1727; With: Henry Grey | Succeeded by George Liddell; Joseph Sabine |
Military offices
| Preceded by Lord Polwarth | Colonel of the 7th Regiment of Dragoons; 1709–1741 | Succeeded by John Cope |
