= Inverbervie (Parliament of Scotland constituency) =

Constituency of the Old Parliament of Scotland

Inverbervie (formerly just Bervie) in Kincardineshire was a royal burgh that elected one commissioner to the Parliament of Scotland and to the Convention of Estates.

After the Acts of Union 1707, Inverbervie, Aberdeen, Arbroath, Brechin and Montrose formed the Aberdeen district of burghs, returning one member between them to the House of Commons of Great Britain.

== List of burgh commissioners ==
- 1612: Arthur Rae
- 1670: Robert Carnegie
- 1672–74: Andrew Cuming
- 1678: John Ayton
- 1681–82: Alexander Man
- 1685–86, 1689 (convention), 1689–1702: William Beattie, bailie
- 1702–1707: Alexander Arbuthnott, after 1704 known as Alexander Maitland

In 1707 Maitland was chosen to be one of the Scottish representatives to the first Parliament of Great Britain.

== See also ==
- List of constituencies in the Parliament of Scotland at the time of the Union
