= Burntisland (Parliament of Scotland constituency) =

Constituency of the Old Parliament of Scotland in Fife, Scotland

Burntisland in Fife was a royal burgh that returned one commissioner to the Parliament of Scotland and to the Convention of Estates.

After the Acts of Union 1707, Burntisland, Dysart, Kinghorn and Kirkcaldy formed the Dysart district of burghs, returning one member between them to the House of Commons of Great Britain.

== List of burgh commissioners ==
- 1661: George Gairdin (or Gairnes) (died c.1662)
- 1663: Gilbert Haliburton
- 1665 convention, 1667 convention, 1669: David Seaton, merchant-burgess (died 1669)
- 1670–72: William Gedd (died 1672)
- 1673–74: James Dewar, merchant-trafficker
- 1678 convention, 1681–82: James Dewar, bailie
- 1685–86: Michael Seton, baillie
- 1689 convention, 1689–1701: Alexander Gedd, bailie
- 1702–07: Sir John Erskine of Alva

== See also ==
- List of constituencies in the Parliament of Scotland at the time of the Union
