= Charles Maitland (MP) =

18th-century Scottish politician

Charles Maitland (c. 1704 – 13 November 1751) was a Scottish politician.

He was son of Hon Alexander Arbuthnot, Baron of the Exchequer and MP in the Scottish Parliament who had assumed the surname of his wife Jean Maitland, the heiress of Sir Charles Maitland, Bt of Pitrichie. He succeeded his father to the Pitrichie estate in 1721.

He qualified as an advocate in 1727 and was the first Sheriff-Depute of Edinburgh in 1748. Later that year he was appointed a Baron of the Exchequer and was replaced as Sheriff-Depute. He represented Aberdeen Burghs in the British Parliament from 1748 to 1751.

He died unmarried in 1751.

Parliament of Great Britain
Preceded by John Maule	Member of Parliament for Aberdeen Burghs; 1748–1751	Succeeded by David Scott
