= James Townsend Oswald =

Scottish politician

James Townsend Oswald (23 February 1748 – 3 January 1814) was a Scottish politician who sat in the House of Commons between 1768 and 1779.

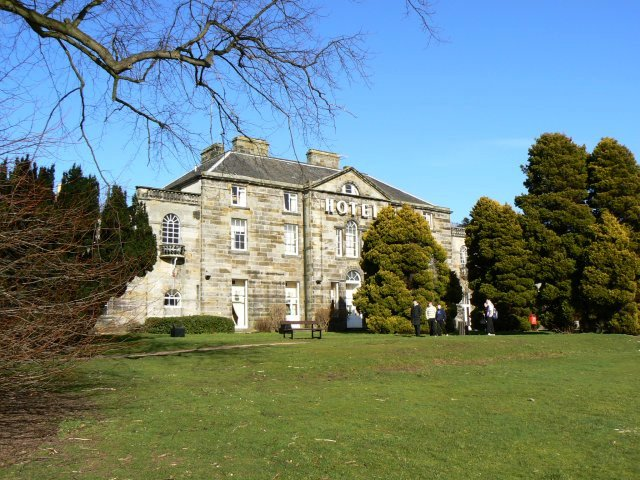
Dunnikier House

Oswald was the son of James Oswald, a politician of Kirkcaldy. The Oswald family became the dominant force in Kirkcaldy politics in the 18th century and Dysart, the second-largest burgh was controlled by the St. Clair interest. The combined Oswald and St. Clair influence often decided who was to be elected.

Oswald was elected member of parliament for Dysart Burghs in succession to his father in 1768 and was Secretary for the Leeward Islands in 1772. He lost the seat in 1774 when to his surprise a rich outsider bribed his way into Parliament. In 1776 Oswald was elected MP for Fife until he resigned on being appointed Auditor of the Exchequer of Scotland on 2 July 1779.

About 1790 he had built Dunnikier House, "a handsome mansion beautifully situated in a richly-wooded demesne".

Oswald died at age 65. He had married Janet Grey of Skibo, Sutherland, who died in 1843. Their son was General Sir John Oswald and their daughter Elizabeth married Thomas Bruce, 7th Earl of Elgin.

Parliament of Great Britain
Preceded by James Oswald	Member of Parliament for Dysart Burghs; 1768–1774	Succeeded by John Johnstone
Preceded by John Scott	Member of Parliament for Fife; 1776–1779	Succeeded by Robert Skene
