= James Erskine (Aberdeen MP) =

British Member of Parliament (born 1671)

James Erskine (born 1671) was a Scottish soldier and politician who sat in the House of Commons in 1715.

Erskine was the eldest surviving son of David Erskine, of Dun, Forfar and his wife Margaret Lumsden, daughter of Sir James Lumsden of Innergellie, Fife. He joined the army and in 1694 was an ensign in the 1st Foot. His father, who died in 1698, disinherited him in favour of his younger brother David. He was a lieutenant in 1701 and a captain in 1707 serving under the Duke of Marlborough in the War of the Spanish Succession.

Erskine was unsuccessful standing for parliament at Aberdeen Burghs at the 1713 general election, but was elected Member of Parliament for Aberdeen Burghs at the 1715 general election. However, he was unseated on petition on 22 July 1715.

Erskine is believed to have taken an active part in the 1745 rebellion when he would have been 74.
