= Sir James Ramsay, 8th Baronet =

Scottish baronet

Sir James Ramsay, 8th Baronet of Bamff FRSE (1797–1859) was a 19th-century Scottish baronet.

== Life ==
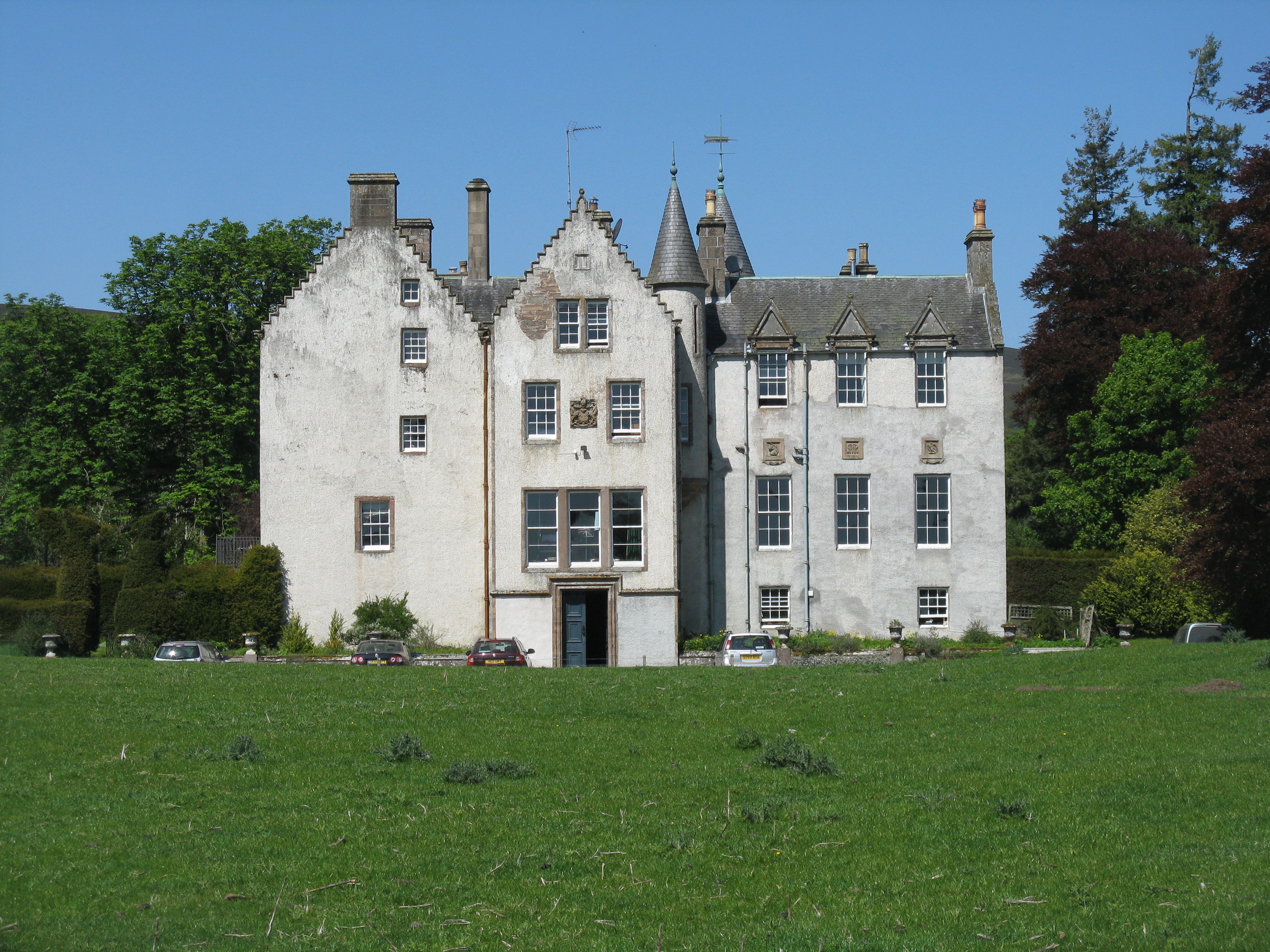
Bamff House

He was born in Bamff House in Perthshire, north-east of Blairgowrie on 26 September 1797, the son of Sir William Ramsay 7th Baronet of Bamff and his wife, Agnata Frances Biscoe.

He became baronet at the age of ten on the death of his father in 1807.

The family motto is "spernit pericula virtus".

In 1823 he became a member of the Highland Society. In 1851 he was elected a Fellow of the Royal Society of Edinburgh. His proposer was William Gregory.

He died on New Year's Day, 1 January 1859.

== Family ==
In 1828 he married Jane Oliphant daughter of John Hope Oliphant and maternal grand-daughter of Sir John Wedderburn of Ballendean.

As they were childless the baronetcy passed to his younger brother, George Ramsay of Banff (1800-1871).

Baronetage of Nova Scotia
Preceded by William Ramsay	Baronet (of Bamff); 1807–1859	Succeeded by George Ramsay
