= James St Clair =

Scottish soldier and politician (1688–1762)

General James St Clair (1688 – 30 November 1762) was a Scottish soldier and Whig politician.

== Background ==
St Clair was the second son of Henry St Clair, 10th Lord Sinclair and his wife Grizel Cockburn, daughter of Sir James Cockburn, 1st Baronet. As a child he received a commission into the 1st Battalion, Royal Regiment of Foot.

== Military career ==
St Clair became an ensign of 6th Regiment of Foot in 1694, however was set on halfpay in 1713. In the next year, he was admitted to the 3rd Foot Guards and was promoted to captain in 1714. He served as 2nd major of his regiment from 1722 and as 1st major from 1725, having been advanced to the rank of brevet colonel two years before. In 1734, St Clair was appointed to the command of the 22nd Regiment of Foot and three years later he was transferred to the colonelship of the Royal Regiment of Foot (later renamed as 1st (Royal) Regiment of Foot), which he held until his death.

He rose to brigadier general in 1739 and then after another two years rose to major general. St Clair became lieutenant-general in charge of the British forces in Flanders in June 1745 and in the following year, he was sent with six thousand men to attack Quebec. Because of delays, he sailed instead to capture the Breton port of Lorient. He destroyed the French fortifications near Quiberon and then returned to England. The philosopher David Hume records in his autobiography that he was appointed as St Clair's secretary at this time.

In 1761, St Clair was finally advanced to the rank of full general.

== Political career ==
St Clair entered the British House of Commons in 1722, sitting for Dysart Burghs until 1734. Two years later, he was elected for Sutherland, which constituency he represented until 1747, when he was again returned for Dysart. He held the latter seat until 1754 and became then member of Parliament for Fife until 1762. St Clair travelled as envoy to the courts of Turin and Vienna in 1748 and later acted as governor of Cork.

== Personal life ==
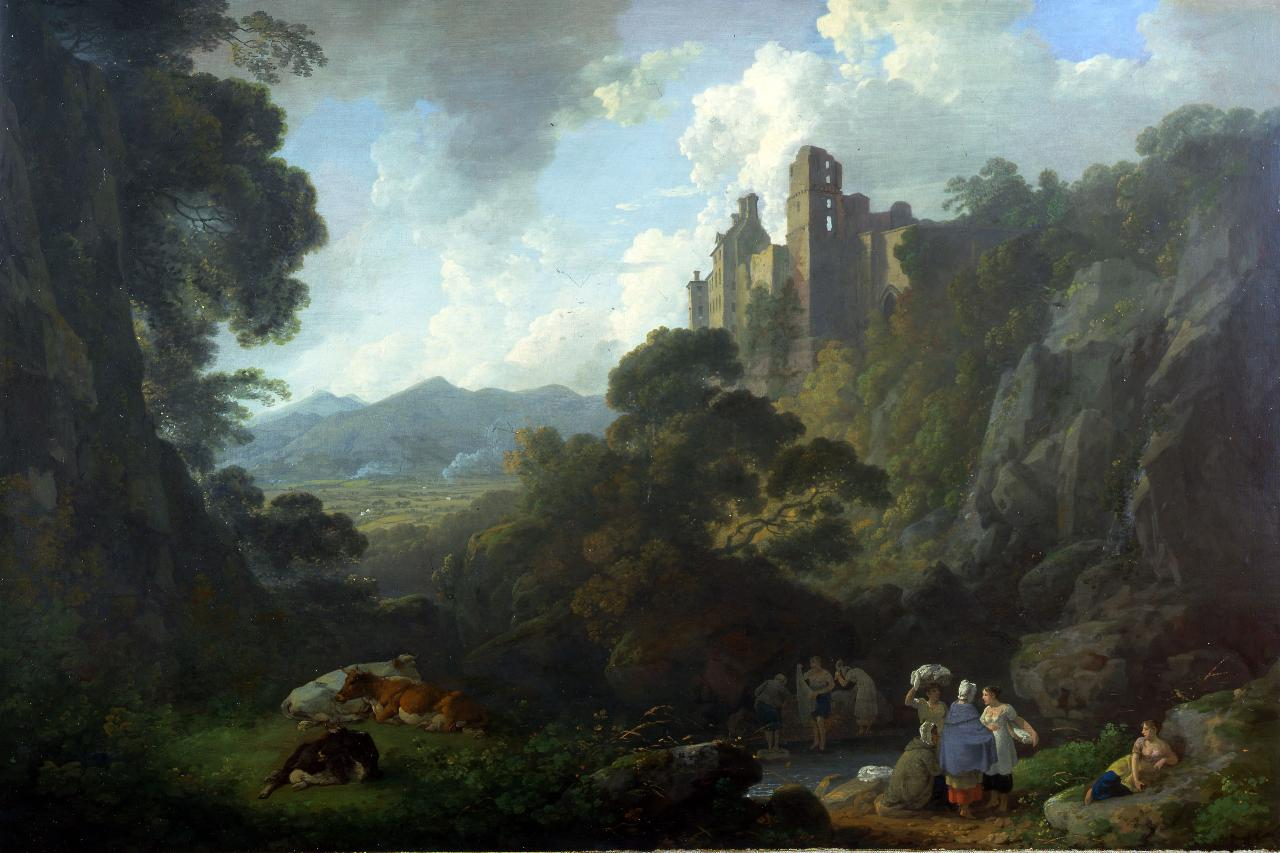
Rosslyn Castle

In 1735, St Clair bought Rosslyn Castle, which was later inherited by the male heirs of his sisters. On the death of his older brother John St Clair in 1750, he succeeded de jure as Lord Sinclair, but never assumed the title, preferring to retain his seat in the Commons.

Around 1745, he married Janet Dalrymple, the youngest daughter of Sir David Dalrymple, 1st Baronet and widow of Sir John Baird, 2nd Baronet. Their marriage was childless. St Clair died in Dysart in 1766 and was survived by his wife for four years. With his death the lordship became dormant until 1782, when it reverted to Charles St Clair, a first cousin of James Sinclair, 7th Lord Sinclair.

== Legacy ==
St. Clair, Minnesota is named after St. Clair.

Parliament of Great Britain
Preceded by William Kerr	Member of Parliament for Dysart Burghs; 1722–1734	Succeeded by Thomas Leslie
Preceded by Sir James Fergusson	Member of Parliament for Sutherland; 1736–1747	Succeeded by George Mackay
Preceded by James Oswald	Member of Parliament for Dysart Burghs; 1747–1754	Succeeded by James Oswald
Preceded by James Oswald	Member of Parliament for Fife; 1754–1762	Succeeded by James Wemyss
Military offices
Preceded by William Barrell	Colonel of the 22nd Regiment of Foot; 1734–1737	Succeeded by John Moyle
Preceded by The Earl of Orkney	Colonel of the 1st (Royal) Regiment of Foot; 1737–1762	Succeeded by Sir Henry Erskine, 5th Bt
Peerage of Scotland
Preceded by John St Clair	Lord Sinclair de jure 1750–1762	Dormant Title next held by Charles St Clair
