= John Gordon (Aberdeen MP) =

Scottish politician and merchant (c.1655 - 1730)

John Gordon (c. 1655 – 24 August 1730), of Aberdeen, was a Scottish merchant and politician who was councillor and Provost of Aberdeen and sat in the British House of Commons from 1708 to 1710.

== Early life ==
Gordon was the son of John Gordon, an Aberdeen merchant, and his wife Christian Henderson. During the 1680s, he was a factor at Campvere, the staple port for Scotland in Friesland. In 1682, he was made a burgess of Elgin. He continued to do business in Rotterdam until at least 1702. He married his first cousin Janet Gordon, whose father Alexander Gordon represented Aberdeen in the Parliament of Scotland.

== Political career ==
At the outbreak of the Glorious Revolution at the end of 1688, Gordon's uncle, Alexander Gordon, was elected Lord Provost of Aberdeen and was a staunch supporter of the new king, serving as provost until 1690. Gordon was likewise a devout Presbyterian, and had his share in the political life of Aberdeen: he was a councillor of the burgh from 1705 to 1709, and served himself as provost from 1706 to 1708. He was the first to sign a loyal address from the council to Queen Anne upon the repulse of the Jacobite attempt at landing in the Firth of Forth.

At the 1708 British general election, Gordon was returned in a contest as Member of Parliament for the new constituency of Aberdeen Burghs and received instruction from his council on matters of local interest, and was urged to protect the interests of the Kirk and to support any act for imposing a subsidy to defray the cost of conducting the war against the French. He took little part in affairs of state, and served on a few Parliamentary committees of local importance. It is not clear if he aligned with any party, but as a Scottish Presbyterian, he supported the Whig administration in voting for the impeachment of Dr Sacheverell. Gordon was dropped from Aberdeen Council in 1710 and, in view of his disappointing performance in Parliament, was discouraged from standing for re-election to Parliament. He stood down at the 1710 general election.

Another humiliation occurred in the following year, when the Presbytery of Aberdeen called his son, Rev. John, to the living of Old Deer. The former minister, an Episcopalian, refused to quit the church and was supported by his parishioners; the Gordons and the supporters of the Presbytery were driven off by a mob, an incident known as the "rabbling of Deer". The younger Gordon was ultimately confirmed in the ministry, which he occupied until his death in 1718, but the riot stimulated the passage of the Scottish Episcopalians Act 1711 and the Church Patronage (Scotland) Act 1711, which strengthened the position of the Episcopalians.

== Later life and legacy ==
Gordon was readmitted to the council from 1714 to 1715, when the Jacobites took over the council during the rising of 1715, and served again from April 1716 to 1719. From 1717 to 1718, he was once more Lord Provost, and took part in efforts to purge episcopalian and Jacobite elements from the University of Aberdeen. He was made an honorary burgess of Old Aberdeen upon his retirement from the council.

Gordon died on 24 August 1730, aged 75, and was buried in St. Nicholas’ church, Aberdeen. He left a daughter and one son, three other sons having predeceased him.

Parliament of Great Britain
New constituency	Member of Parliament for Aberdeen Burghs; 1708 – 1710	Succeeded by James Scott
Civic offices
Preceded by Alexander Patton	Lord Provost of Aberdeen; 1705–1708	Succeeded by John Allardes
Preceded by Robert Stewart	Lord Provost of Aberdeen; 1716–1718	Succeeded by George Fordyce
