= Alexander Allardyce (politician) =

Scottish politician and slave trader (1743–1801)

- Born: c. 1743; Aberdeen, Scotland
- Died: 1 November 1801 (aged 58); United Kingdom
- Occupation(s): Politician, slave trader

Alexander Allardyce (c. 1743 – 1 November 1801) was a Scottish politician and slave trader who sat in the Parliament of Great Britain and later the Parliament of the United Kingdom for the Aberdeen Burghs from 18 May 1792 to 1 November 1801. He came from an old Kincardineshire family.

== Early life ==
Alexander Allardyce was born in Aberdeen c. 1743. As a young man, he traveled to the British colony of Jamaica and worked as a slave trader, as well as fathering an illegitimate daughter with Elizabeth Delpratt of Kingston. After his return to Scotland in 1780 he purchased an estate in Kincardineshire. His second daughter Eleanor Allardyce would go onto marry Archibald Kennedy, Earl of Cassilis.

== Career as member of the British Parliament ==
Allardyce first entered Parliament in 1792 with the backing of Henry Dundas, after the death of the Aberdeen sitting member. He would retain the seat unchallenged in 1796.

He spoke in favor of the Aberdeen Police Bill of 28 April 1794, and protested strongly against provisions of a Post Office Duty Bill on 21 February and 4 March 1801.

== Death ==
Allardyce died in office on 1 November 1801. He was buried at St Nicholas Kirkyard, in Aberdeen.
