= Aberdeen Burghs (UK Parliament constituency) =

Parliamentary constituency in the United Kingdom, 1801–1832

- Former district of Burghs constituency for the House of Commons
- Subdivision: Aberdeenshire, Kincardineshire, Forfarshire
- Major settlements: Aberdeen, Inverbervie, Arbroath, Brechin, Montrose

1708–1832
- Seats: 1
- Created from: Aberdeen, Arbroath, Brechin, Inverbervie, Montrose
- Replaced by: Aberdeen; Montrose Burghs

Aberdeen Burghs was a district of burghs constituency which was represented from 1708 to 1800 in the House of Commons of the Parliament of Great Britain, and from 1801 to 1832 in the House of Commons of the Parliament of the United Kingdom.

== Creation ==
The British parliamentary constituency was created in 1708 following the Acts of Union 1707 and replaced the former Parliament of Scotland burgh constituencies of Aberdeen, Arbroath, Brechin, Inverbervie and Montrose.

== Boundaries ==
The constituency consisted of the burgh of Aberdeen in the County of Aberdeen, the burgh of Inverbervie in the County of Kincardine, and the burghs of Arbroath, Brechin and Montrose in the County of Forfar.

== History ==
The constituency returned one Member of Parliament (MP) by the first past the post system until the seat was abolished for the 1832 general election.

In 1832 the constituency was divided between the new constituencies of Aberdeen and Montrose Burghs. The Aberdeen constituency covered the burgh of Aberdeen, while Montrose Burghs covered the other burghs plus the burgh of Forfar, which was previously a component of the Perth Burghs constituency.

== Members of Parliament ==
Election	Member	Party
1708	John Gordon	
1710	James Scott	
1711	William Livingston	
1713	John Middleton	Whig
February 1715	James Erskine	Tory
July 1715	John Middleton	Whig
April 1722	William Kerr	
October 1722	John Middleton	Whig
1739	John Maule	Whig
1748	Charles Maitland	
1751	David Scott	
1767	Sir John Lindsay	
1768	Thomas Lyon	Pro-Administration Whig
1779	Adam Drummond	
1784	Sir David Carnegie, Bt	Whig
1790	Alexander Callender	
1792	Alexander Allardyce	
Act of Union 1800	Parliament of Great Britain abolished, Parliament of the United Kingdom created	
1801	Alexander Allardyce	
1802 by-election	James Farquhar	
1806	John Ramsay	
1807	James Farquhar	
1818	Joseph Hume	Radical
1826	Joseph Hume	Radical
1830	Sir James Carnegie, Bt	Tory
1831	Horatio Ross	Whig
1832	Constituency abolished	

== Elections ==
=== Elections in the 1700s ===
1708 general election: Aberdeen Burghs
Party	Candidate	Votes	%	±%
Independent	John Gordon			
Independent	James Scott			
Rejected ballots				
Majority				
Turnout				
Registered electors				
Independent win (new seat)				

=== Elections in the 1710s ===
1710 general election: Aberdeen Burghs
Party	Candidate	Votes	%	±%
Independent	James Scott	3	60.0	
Independent	William Livingston	2	40.0	
Independent	Thomas Coutts	0	0.0	
Rejected ballots		0	0.0	
Majority		1	20.0	
Turnout		5		
Registered electors				
Independent gain from Independent		Swing		

1711 Aberdeen Burghs By-election: Aberdeen Burghs
Party	Candidate	Votes	%	±%
Independent	William Livingston	Unopposed		
Registered electors				
Independent gain from Independent				

1713 general election: Aberdeen Burghs
Party	Candidate	Votes	%	±%
Whig	John Middleton			New
Tory	James Erskine			New
Rejected ballots				
Majority				
Turnout				
Registered electors				
Whig gain from Independent		Swing		

1715 general election: Aberdeen Burghs
Party	Candidate	Votes	%	±%
Tory	James Erskine			
Whig	John Middleton			
Rejected ballots				
Majority				
Turnout				
Registered electors				
Tory gain from Whig		Swing		

1715 Aberdeen Burghs By-election: Aberdeen Burghs
Party	Candidate	Votes	%	±%
Whig	John Middleton	Unopposed		
Registered electors				
Whig gain from Tory				

=== Elections in the 1720s ===
1722 general election: Aberdeen Burghs
Party	Candidate	Votes	%	±%
Whig	William Kerr			
Whig	John Middleton			
Rejected ballots				
Majority				
Turnout				
Registered electors				
Whig hold		Swing		

1722 Aberdeen Burghs By-election
Party	Candidate	Votes	%	±%
Whig	John Middleton	Unopposed		
Registered electors				
Whig hold				

1727 general election: Aberdeen Burghs
Party	Candidate	Votes	%	±%
Whig	John Middleton	Unopposed		
Registered electors				
Whig hold				

=== Elections in the 1730s ===
1734 general election: Aberdeen Burghs
Party	Candidate	Votes	%	±%
Whig	John Middleton	Unopposed		
Registered electors				
Whig hold				

1739 Aberdeen Burghs By-election
Party	Candidate	Votes	%	±%
Whig	John Maule	Unopposed		
Registered electors				
Whig hold				

=== Elections in the 1740s ===
1741 general election: Aberdeen Burghs
Party	Candidate	Votes	%	±%
Whig	John Maule			N/A
Independent	Alexander Udny			New
Rejected ballots				
Majority				
Turnout				
Registered electors				
Whig hold		Swing		

1747 general election: Aberdeen Burghs
Party	Candidate	Votes	%	±%
Whig	John Maule	Unopposed		
Registered electors				
Whig hold				

1748 Aberdeen Burghs By-election
Party	Candidate	Votes	%	±%
Independent	Charles Maitland			New
Independent	David Scott			New
Rejected ballots				
Majority				
Turnout				
Registered electors				
Independent gain from Whig		Swing		

=== Elections in the 1750s ===
1751 Aberdeen Burghs By-election
Party	Candidate	Votes	%	±%
Independent	David Scott	Unopposed		
Registered electors				
Independent gain from Independent				

1754 general election: Aberdeen Burghs
Party	Candidate	Votes	%	±%
Independent	David Scott	Unopposed		
Registered electors				
Independent gain from Independent				

=== Elections in the 1760s ===
1761 general election: Aberdeen Burghs
Party	Candidate	Votes	%	±%
Independent	David Scott	Unopposed		
Registered electors				
Independent gain from Independent				

1762 Aberdeen Burghs By-election
Party	Candidate	Votes	%	±%
Independent	John Lindsay	Unopposed		
Registered electors				
Independent gain from Independent				

1768 general election: Aberdeen Burghs
Party	Candidate	Votes	%	±%
Independent	Thomas Lyon	3	60.0	N/A
Whig	William Maule	2	40.0	New
Rejected ballots				
Majority		1	20.0	N/A
Turnout		5		
Registered electors				
Independent gain from Independent		Swing		

=== Elections in the 1770s ===
1774 general election: Aberdeen Burghs
Party	Candidate	Votes	%	±%
Independent	Thomas Lyon	Unopposed		
Registered electors				
Independent gain from Independent				

1779 Aberdeen Burghs By-election
Party	Candidate	Votes	%	±%
Independent	Adam Drummond	Unopposed		
Registered electors				
Independent gain from Independent				

=== Elections in the 1780s ===
1780 general election: Aberdeen Burghs
Party	Candidate	Votes	%	±%
Independent	Adam Drummond	Unopposed		
Registered electors				
Independent hold				

1784 general election: Aberdeen Burghs
Party	Candidate	Votes	%	±%
Whig	Sir David Carneige	Unopposed		
Registered electors				
Whig gain from Independent				

=== Elections in the 1790s ===
1790 general election: Aberdeen Burghs
Party	Candidate	Votes	%	±%
Independent	Alexander Callander	3	60.0	New
Whig	Sir David Carnegie	2	40.0	N/A
Rejected ballots				
Majority		1	20.0	N/A
Turnout		5		
Registered electors				
Independent gain from Whig		Swing		

1792 Aberdeen Burghs By-election
Party	Candidate	Votes	%	±%
Independent	Alexander Allardyce	Unopposed		
Registered electors				
Independent gain from Independent				

1796 general election: Aberdeen Burghs
Party	Candidate	Votes	%	±%
Independent	Alexander Allardyce	Unopposed		
Registered electors				
Independent hold				

=== Elections in the 1800s ===
1802 Aberdeen Burghs by-election
Party	Candidate	Votes	%	±%
Independent	James Farquhar	Unopposed		
Registered electors				
Independent hold				

1802 general election: Aberdeen Burghs
Party	Candidate	Votes	%	±%
Independent	James Farquhar	Unopposed		
Registered electors				
Independent hold				

1806 general election: Aberdeen Burghs
Party	Candidate	Votes	%	±%
Whig	John Ramsay (British Army officer)	3	60.0	New
Independent	James Farquhar	2	40.0	N/A
Rejected ballots				
Majority		1	20.0	N/A
Turnout		5		
Registered electors				
Whig gain from Independent		Swing		

1807 general election: Aberdeen Burghs
Party	Candidate	Votes	%	±%
Independent	James Farquhar	3	60.0	+20.0
Whig	John Ramsay (British Army officer)	2	40.0	−20.0
Rejected ballots				
Majority		1	20.0	N/A
Turnout		5		
Registered electors				
Independent gain from Whig		Swing		

=== Elections in the 1810s ===
1812 general election: Aberdeen Burghs
Party	Candidate	Votes	%	±%
Independent	James Farquhar	4	80.0	+20.0
Whig	Thomas Molison	1	20.0	−20.0
Rejected ballots				
Majority		3	60.0	+40.0
Turnout		5		
Registered electors				
Independent hold		Swing		

1818 general election: Aberdeen Burghs
Party	Candidate	Votes	%	±%
Radical	Joseph Hume	3	75.0	N/A
Independent	James Farquhar	1	25.0	−55.0
Rejected ballots				
Majority		2	50.0	N/A
Turnout		4		
Registered electors				
Radical gain from Independent		Swing		

=== Elections in the 1820s ===
1820 general election: Aberdeen Burghs
Party	Candidate	Votes	%	±%
Radical	Joseph Hume	3	60.0	−15.0
Independent	John Mitchell	2	40.0	+15.0
Rejected ballots				
Majority		1	20.0	−30.0
Turnout		5		
Registered electors				
Radical hold		Swing		

1826 general election: Aberdeen Burghs
Party	Candidate	Votes	%	±%
Radical	Joseph Hume	Unopposed		
Registered electors				
Radical hold				

=== Elections in the 1830s ===
1830 general election: Aberdeen Burghs
Party	Candidate	Votes	%	±%
Tory	James Carnegie	3	60.0	New
Whig	Horatio Ross	2	40.0	N/A
Rejected ballots				
Majority		1	20.0	N/A
Turnout		5		
Registered electors				
Tory gain from Radical		Swing		

1831 general election: Aberdeen Burghs
Party	Candidate	Votes	%	±%
Whig	Horatio Ross	Unopposed		
Registered electors				
Whig gain from Tory				
