= Path House, Kirkcaldy =

Building in Kirkcaldy, Scotland

Coordinates: 56.1195°N 3.1478°W

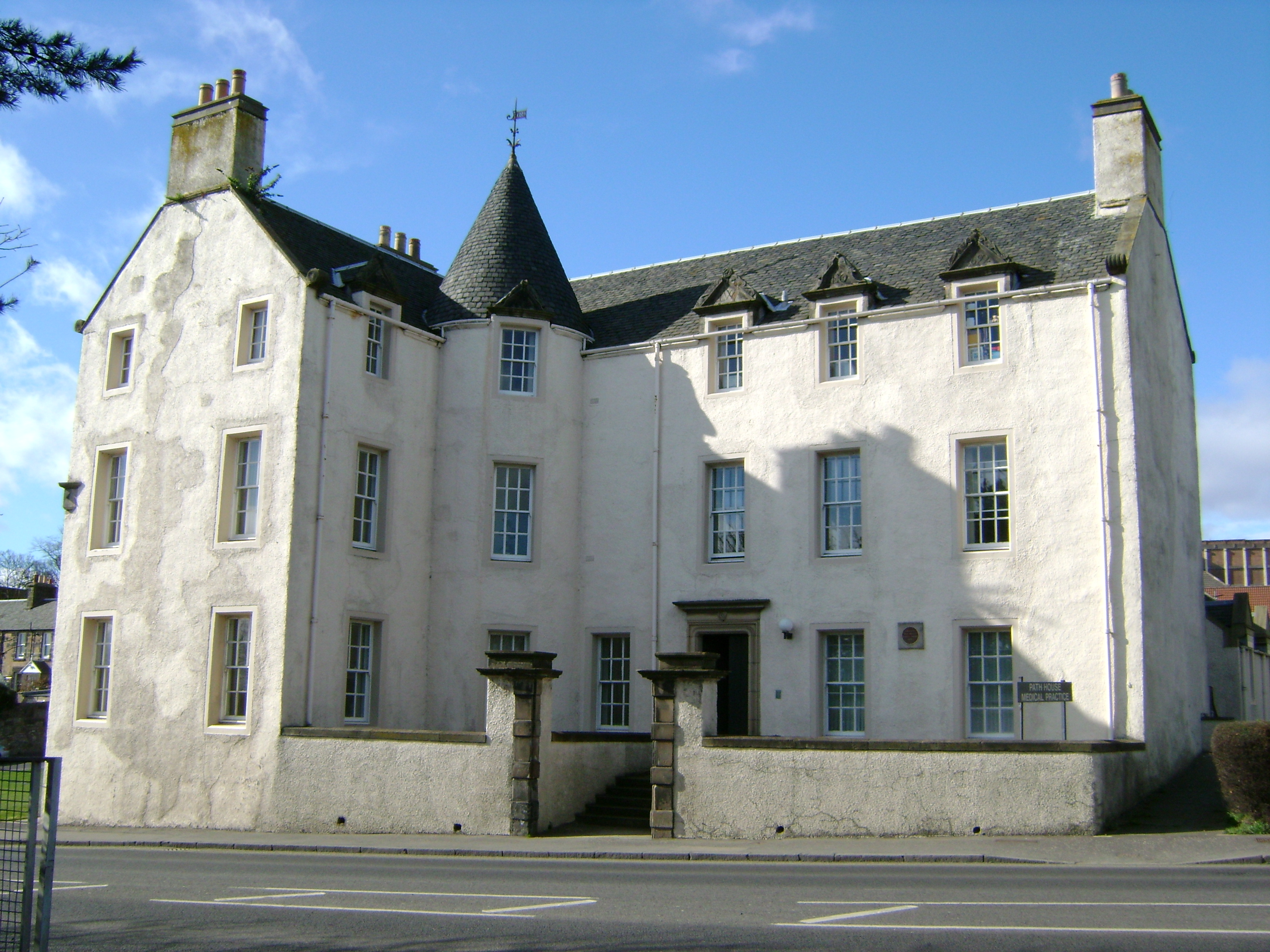
Path House, Kirkcaldy

Path House, formerly known as Dunnikier House, is a manor house in the Scottish town of Kirkcaldy in the Fife Council Area. It was listed by Historic Environment Scotland in 1971 as a Category A listed building.

== History ==
The mansion, located on Nether Street (A921) near Kirkcaldy Harbour, was built in 1692 by John Watson after his marriage to Euphan Orrock, as confirmed by the monograms "IW" and "EO" displayed at various locations on the house. After just a few years, it was transferred to the Oswald family who remodelled it in the early 18th century, when the rear wings may have been added. As the town of Kirkcaldy spread ever nearer to the mansion, the Oswalds decided in the 1790s to build and move to a new house, also called Dunnikier House, further away from the town.

In 1891, the old house was renovated and converted into the rectory of the local parish church. In 1979 the house was acquired by the Fife Health Board, who restored it and renamed it Path House. First serving as a nursing home, it has hosted a health centre since the 1990s.

== Description ==
The three-story building, plastered with harl between natural stone borders, originally had an L-shaped floor plan. The front facade is largely symmetrical with a frieze below a simple cornice. In the interior corner of the south-facing main façade is an engaged round stair tower with a conical roof and weather vane. Next to the tower is the main entrance. Monograms decorate the dormer windows gableheads. The roofs are made of grey slate.
