= Sir James Ramsay, 10th Baronet =

British historian (1832 - 1925)

Sir James Henry Ramsay, 10th Baronet, FBA (1832–1925) was a British historian and landowner, who produced a seven-volume history of England and an original study of the revenues of its kings.

== Early life and family ==
Born on 21 May 1832 at Versailles, he was the son of the philosopher Sir George Ramsay, 9th Baronet (died 1871), of Bamff, and his wife Emily Eugenia, née Lennon (died 1885), daughter of an Irish captain. He attended Christ Church, Oxford, taking first-class honours in classics in 1854 and in law and modern history the following year, graduating with a BA.

== Historian and later life ==
A student of Christ Church from 1854 to 1861, Ramsay left upon marriage and was called to the bar in 1863 but likely never practised. After examining modern history and law papers at the University of Oxford in the late 1860s, he decided to produce his own history of England, financially enabled when he succeeded to his father's title and estates in 1871, which would comprise 13,872 acres worth £4,570 in 1883. He settled down to his research but produced only articles until the first two volumes of his history series was published in 1892; between then and 1913, he penned five further volumes spanning the period 55 BC to AD 1485. The books were primarily reference histories, offering chronological narratives; Ramsay aimed to give inline citations to his sources following the emerging German practice, although his narrative style was not always popular.

As the Oxford Dictionary of National Biography notes, "Ramsay's most original contribution to knowledge was the work he did on the revenues of the kings of England, based on his study of the issue rolls, receipt rolls, and enrolled customs accounts in the Public Record Office". This had shortcomings and he omitted to search other relevant sources, but the approach was pioneering and formed the basis of his 1925 monograph, A History of the Revenues of the Kings of England, 1066–1399.

Ramsay received honorary doctorates from the University of Glasgow and the University of Cambridge, and he was elected a Fellow of the British Academy in 1915. He died on 17 February 1925. His daughters included the classicist Agnata Butler and the politician Katharine Stewart-Murray, Duchess of Atholl. His son James succeeded to the baronetcy.

== Works ==
- The Foundations of England, Vol. 1: 55 BC to 1066 (1898)
- The Foundations of England, Vol. 2: 1066 to 1154
- The Angevin Empire: 1154 to 1216 (1903)
- The Dawn of the Constitution: 1216 to 1307 (1908)
- Genesis of Lancaster, Vol. 1: 1307 to 1368 (1913)
- Genesis of Lancaster, Vol. 2: 1369 to 1399
- Lancaster and York, Vol. 1: 1399 to 1437 (1892)
- Lancaster and York, Vol. 2: 1437-1485

Baronetage of Nova Scotia
Preceded by George Ramsay	Baronet (of Bamff); 1871–1925	Succeeded by James George Ramsay
