= Bamff =

Estate in Perth and Kinross, Scotland

Coordinates: 56.6486°N 3.2709°W

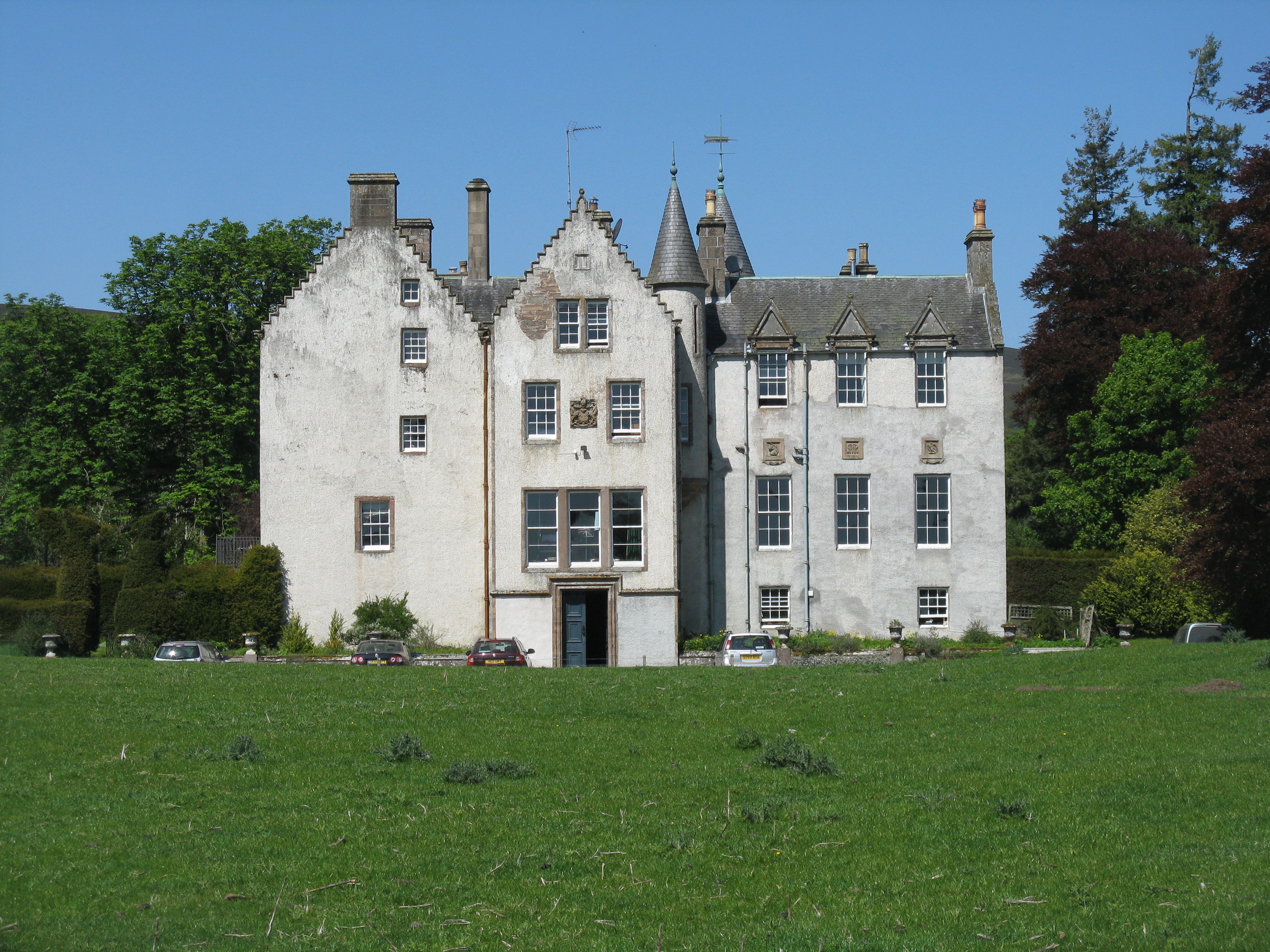
Bamff House, 2012

Rewilded Exmoor ponies drinking from Bamff beaver ponds for 1st time in Scotland since the late 16th century.

Bamff is the home of the Ramsays of Bamff, and is located within a 525-hectare (1,300-acre) estate in Perthshire, Scotland. Bamff House began as a fortified tower in the late 16th century and was added to and altered in almost every century since then. Bamff Estate is one of the pioneering examples of rewilding in the United Kingdom.

== History ==
The Ramsays held the lands at Bamff from 1232, Nessus de Ramsay having been physician to Alexander II. His descendant, Alexander Ramsay, was physician to both James VI and Charles I. It was his son, Gilbert, who was made baronet in 1666 in recognition of the bravery of his own son, James, at the Battle of Rullion Green. The current owners are Paul and Louise Ramsay.

== Bamff Wildland ==
In 1992, Paul and Louise Ramsay began rewilding at Bamff Estate by first beginning to take agricultural land out of production (barley, sheep, and domestic cattle) and planting native pinewoods and broadleaf trees, establishing an early foundation for habitat recovery and rewilding. Bamff was one of the first places in Scotland to pilot a new, globally recognised conservation approach known as Other effective area-based conservation measures (OECMs) aimed at protecting and enhancing biodiversity beyond traditional protected areas.

In 2020, Bamff expanded its conservation efforts by removing around 300 sheep from 12 fields and installing a perimeter fence around a third of the estate to create a 170 hectares (420 acres) 'Bamff Wildland'. Bamff Wildland is a member of the Northwoods Rewilding Network in Scotland as well as the Scottish Rewilding Alliance, Rewilding Britain, and Rewilding Europe.

The first Eurasian beaver (Castor fiber) to return to Scotland since their extirpation 450 years ago were not government sanctioned and were first observed in the River Tay watershed in 2001. Western European beaver were kept in an enclosure at Bamff beginning in 2002, began breeding in 2005, and there were likely accidental escapees into the River Tay watershed by about 2007.

Paul Ramsay was arrested at the Perth Police Station when a beaver gnawed the gatepost of a house between Bamff and Alyth. Charges where dropped when he explained that the dispersing beaver could have come from anywhere in the Tay watershed. In 2010, Scottish Natural Heritage announced a plan to trap the beaver recolonizing the River Tay, and place them in zoos. The Ramsays formed a nonprofit, the Scottish Wild Beaver Group, to educate and oppose the plan. However, the first beaver placed in a zoo died and the government suspended the trapping program. Adam Ramsay published a children's picture book in 2026 entitled My Dad Brought Beavers Back, depicting the rewilding efforts of his father on the estate.

Multiple academic studies of the impact of rewilding Bamff with beavers have been published. A twelve-year study (2003–2014) of the reintroduction of beaver to an agriculturally-drained and degraded fen at Bamff Wildlands documented a 46% increase in plant species richness and a 148% increase in plant species abundance, illustrating the impact of the ecosystem engineers. A parallel study over the same period found that macrocyte (vascular plant) species richness increased 300%. A third study of the same 5.3 acres (2.1 hectares) wetland found that organic matter retention and aquatic plant biomass increased (7 and 20 fold higher respectively) in beaver ponds relative to unmodified channels.

In January 2024, Deborah Kim Davy reintroduced 12 Exmoor ponies to Bamff. This ancient breed, which fell below 50 surviving animals after World War II, is the closest living descendant of the wild pony of Northern Europe and ancestral to all the British Isles breeds of hill pony. The ponies have thrived at Bamff and now number almost 30 animals, after exporting some colts to other refuges. Bamff is now an important breeding centre for the Exmoor pony with translocations guided by experts to optimize genetic diversity.

== Recreation ==
Bamff Estate hosts 2.5 kilometres (1.6 mi) of the Cateran Trail, an 103 kilometres (64 mi) circular long-distance walking route in central Scotland.

Bamff Ecotourism provides access to wildlife observers to see the beaver which inhabit a 32-acre (130,000 m^{2}) area of woodland and wetland. The Exmoor ponies and other wildlife also attract visitors.

== Performance Art Studies at Bamff Wildlands ==
University of Edinburgh researcher David Overend has studied the rewilding of Bamff as a model for interdisciplinary performance art, likening parallels between beaver-related ecological processes that are often entangled, unpredictable and stochastic, continually practiced, and at environmental edges (ecotones) between different habitats and creative performance that embrace similar principles. He further compared the diversity of habitat patches between Bamff's beaver wildlands and the anthropogenic world and suggests they could inspire performance researchers to further "disrupt imaginaries" and "set in motion new lines of thinking". Similar research based on sharing space with Bamff's beavers and undertaking mimetic behavior argues that artistic research can no longer function only on a humanist model (humans collaborating with humans on human issues) but can learn from the natural world and even explore interspecies communication.

== Notable former resident owners ==
- Sir James Henry Ramsay
- Sir James Douglas Ramsay
- Lady Hope Anita Jane Ramsay

== Bamff Photo Gallery ==
Bamff House, circa 1850

Beaver dam and wetland

Rewilded Eurasian beavers drown and girdle non-native conifer tree at Bamff.
