= List of acts of the Parliament of Scotland from 1443 =

This is a list of acts of the Parliament of Scotland for the year 1443.

It lists acts of Parliament of the old Parliament of Scotland, that was merged with the old Parliament of England to form the Parliament of Great Britain, by the Union with England Act 1707 (c. 7).

For other years, see list of acts of the Parliament of Scotland. For the period after 1707, see list of acts of the Parliament of Great Britain.

== 1443 ==
The 4th parliament of James II, a general council held in Stirling from 4 November 1443.

Short title, or popular name	Citation	Royal assent
Long title
Church Act 1443 (repealed)	1443 c. 1 (Note: This is the citation in the Record Edition.); 1443 c. 7 (Note: This is the citation in the Duodecimal Edition.)	4 November 1443
For the supple and defens of haly kirk. For the aid and defence of the holy church. (Repealed by Statute Law Revision (Scotland) Act 1906 (6 Edw. 7. c. 38))
Papal Jurisdiction Act 1443 (repealed)	1443 c. 2 — (Note: This act is not listed in the Duodecimal Edition.)	4 November 1443
Of obediens til our haly fadir the pape Eugene. Of obedience to our Holy Father, the Pope Eugune. (Repealed by General Assembly Act 1592 (c. 8))

=== Sources ===
- Alexander, William (1841). "Acta Parliamentorum Regis Jacobi Secundi". An Abridgement of the Acts of the Parliaments of Scotland. Edinburgh: Adam and Charles Black. p. 440 – via Google Books.
- Alexander, William (1841). "Acta Parliamentorum Regis Jacobi Secundi". An Abridgement of the Acts of the Parliaments of Scotland. Edinburgh: Adam and Charles Black. p. 440 – via Google Books.
- Chronological Table of the Statutes. London: Her Majesty's Stationery Office. 1972. p. 1317 – via Google Books.
- "Index of Statutes: James II (1437-1460)". Records of the Parliaments of Scotland to 1707. University of St Andrews.

== See also ==
- List of legislation in the United Kingdom
- Records of the Parliaments of Scotland
