= Restoration Parliament =

Restoration Parliament may refer to the following Parliaments associated with the Stuart Restoration of 1660:

- Convention Parliament (1660), England
- Cavalier Parliament, England, 1661–1679
- Restoration Parliament (Scotland), 1661–1663
- Restoration Parliament (Ireland), 1661–1666

== See also ==
- Restoration (disambiguation) § History
