= Glorious Revolution in Scotland =

1688 deposition of King James VII

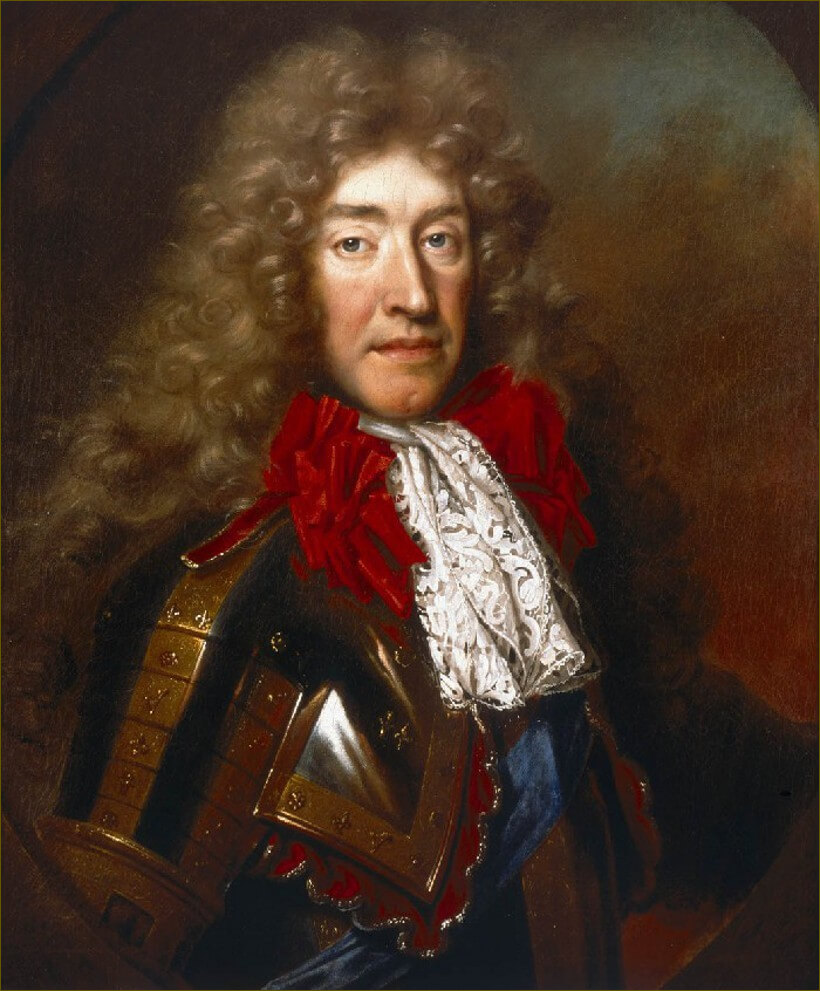
James VII, who was deposed 1688

The Glorious Revolution in Scotland (Note: Scottish Gaelic: An t-Aramach Glòrmhor),) refers to the process whereby James VII was deposed by the Parliament of Scotland, and replaced by his daughter Mary II and her husband William of Orange as joint monarchs of Scotland. It confirmed the primacy of Parliament over the Crown, while the Church of Scotland was re-established as a Presbyterian polity.

Although James became king in February 1685 with widespread support in both countries, tolerance for his personal Catholicism did not apply to the religion in general. When the Parliaments of England and Scotland refused to rescind legal restrictions on Catholics, James suspended them and ruled by decree. The birth of a Catholic heir in June 1688 caused widespread civil disorder in Scotland and England and a coalition of English politicians and soldiers issued an Invitation to William. They agreed to support Dutch military intervention in order to enforce Mary's rights as heir to the English throne; on 5 November 1688, William landed in South-West England and James fled to France on 23 December.

Despite Scotland's lack of involvement in the Invitation, the veteran Scots Brigade formed part of the Dutch invasion force and Scots were prominent on both sides. Many of William's advisors were Protestant exiles like Leven and Melville, while James' closest counsellors were two Scots Catholics, the Earl of Perth and his brother Melfort. On 7 January 1689, the Scottish Privy Council asked William to act as regent pending election of a Convention of the Estates of Scotland. In February 1689, William and Mary were appointed joint monarchs of England and in March, the Convention met to agree a similar settlement for Scotland.

While the Revolution was quick and relatively bloodless in England, a Scottish rising in support of James caused significant casualties and Jacobitism persisted as a political force until the mid-18th century. In 2016, one of the laws resulting from the Revolution, the Claim of Right Act 1689, was referenced in legal arguments as to whether Scotland was bound by Brexit.

== Background ==
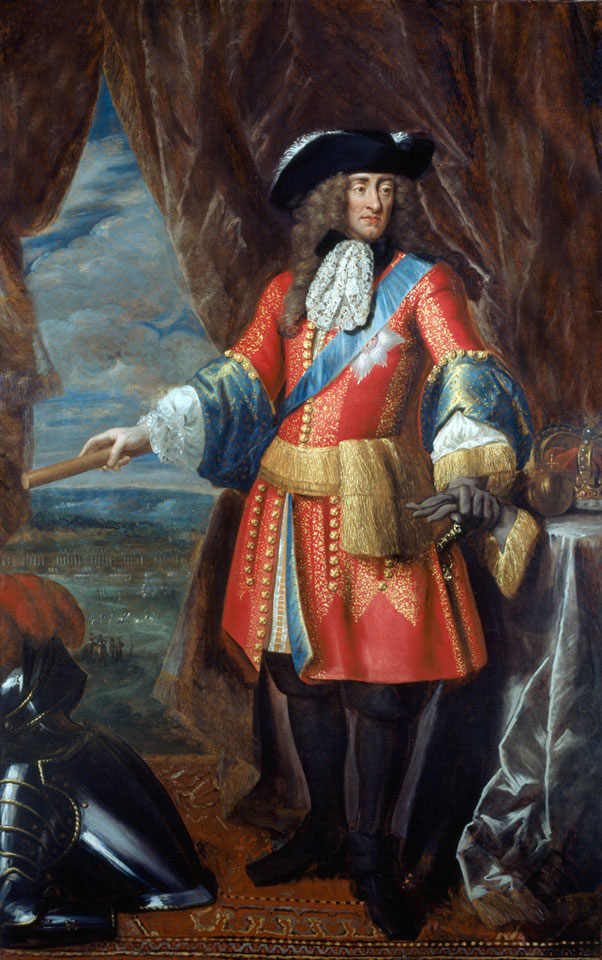
James VII & II c. 1685 as Army Commander

"The Glorious Revolution in Scotland has been poorly understood because...no full-scale treatment...exists comparable to those we possess for England and we have no scholarly analysis of the Scottish constitutional settlement of 1689 (as encapsulated in the Claim of Right and the Articles of Grievances) on a par with...the English Declaration of Rights".

— Harris, Taylor: The Final Crisis of the Stuart Monarchy

Divergences between the Glorious Revolution in Scotland and England stemmed from political and religious differences between the two kingdoms, which experienced the 1638 to 1651 Wars of the Three Kingdoms and 1660 Restoration differently. Close links between religion and political ideology meant disputes caused huge dislocation and damage; casualties in the Civil Wars were proportionally higher in percentage terms than those later experienced by the United Kingdom in the First World War.

Presbyterian versus Episcopalian now implies differences in both structure and doctrine, but this was not the case in the 17th century. Episcopalian meant governance by bishops, appointed by the monarch, while Presbyterian structures were ruled by Elders, nominated by congregations; in Scotland, both sides were doctrinal Calvinists. Since bishops sat in the Scottish Parliament, arguments over their role were as much about politics as religious practice. Changes of regime in 1638, 1651 and 1661 led to the victors excluding their opponents, making the contest for control of the Church of Scotland, or kirk, increasingly bitter.

As Charles II had no legitimate children, his brother James was his heir. James secretly became a Catholic in 1669, and although long suspected, his conversion only became public knowledge in 1679. While the Parliament of England attempted to exclude him from the English throne as a result, in Scotland he was viewed with much greater sympathy.

The 1681 Scottish Succession Act confirmed his status as the legal heir 'regardless of religion', and stated its aim was to make his exclusion from the English throne impossible without '...the dreadfull consequences of a civil war.' This was reaffirmed in the 1681 Scottish Test Act, although with the crucial qualifier all government officials and MPs 'promise to uphold the true Protestant religion.' Tolerance for James' personal beliefs did not extend to Catholicism in general, a distinction he failed to appreciate.

As a result, while south west Scotland was a stronghold for Covenanter dissidents who opposed James on religious grounds, elsewhere there was little support for Argyll's Rising in June 1685, which was easily put down.

== Deposition of James VII ==
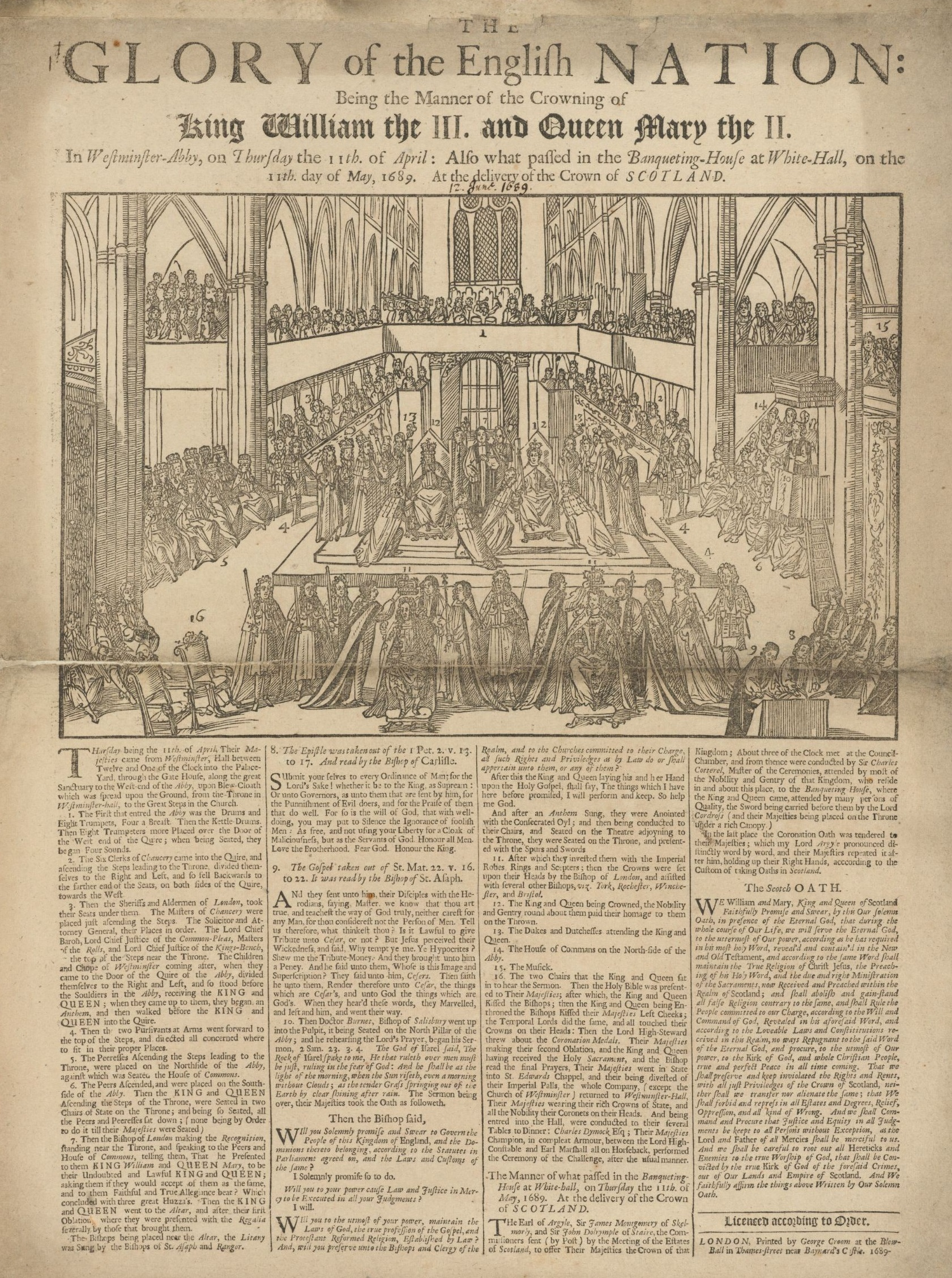
1689 broadside depicting the April 1689 coronation at Westminster Abbey of William and Mary, and describing the events of 11 May 1689, when the Crown of Scotland was delivered to the new monarchs at the Banqueting House, and they swore a Scottish coronation oath.

In 1685, James' position in Scotland was more secure than it was in England. The 1681 Scottish Succession and Test Acts made obedience to the monarch a legal obligation, 'regardless of religion' but in return confirmed the primacy of the Church of Scotland, or Kirk. Argyll's Rising collapsed due to lack of popular support; repealing the Test Act undermined James' Episcopalian base while rewarding the dissident Presbyterians who backed Argyll.

The perception that James was willing to ignore his commitments, his Coronation Oath and his own supporters undermined his policies. They were also badly timed, since the October 1685 Edict of Fontainebleau revoked tolerance for French Protestants, causing an estimated 200,000 to 400,000 Protestants to flee France in the next five years. The killing of over 2,000 Swiss Waldensians in 1686 reinforced fears that Protestant Europe was threatened by a French-led Catholic counter-reformation.

In June 1688, two events turned dissent into a crisis; the birth of James Francis Edward on 10 June created a Catholic heir, who would precede James' Protestant daughter Mary, married to William of Orange, in the succession. Though James argued that he merely wanted to increase freedom for Catholics, his prosecution of the Seven Bishops seemed to go beyond this and was perceived as an assault on the Episcopalian establishment; their acquittal on 30 June destroyed James' political authority.

In 1685, many feared civil war if James were bypassed; by 1688, anti-Catholic riots made it seem only his removal could prevent one. As events in England rapidly escalated James's chief advisor, the Earl of Sunderland secretly co-ordinated with Henry Sydney to prepare the Invitation to William, assuring him of support from across the English political class for armed intervention. Anxious to secure English financial and military support against France, William landed in Brixham on 5 November with 14,000 men; as he advanced, much of the Royal Army deserted and James went into exile on 23 December.

While Scotland had remained relatively passive in the events, once the king fled to France, mob riots in Edinburgh removed Jesuits from the Chapel Royal at Holyrood. Events in England pre-empted a Scottish solution. As the English Parliament offered their throne to William and Mary in February 1689, James remained King of Scots for a further four months until 4 April 1689. While in England a large majority agreed that Mary should replace her father, William demanded he be made joint monarch and sole ruler if she died. This was only narrowly approved. In Scotland, the split within the Kirk made William more important; his Calvinism meant that Presbyterians saw him as a natural ally, while the Episcopalian minority needed his support to retain control.

== Convention of Estates ==
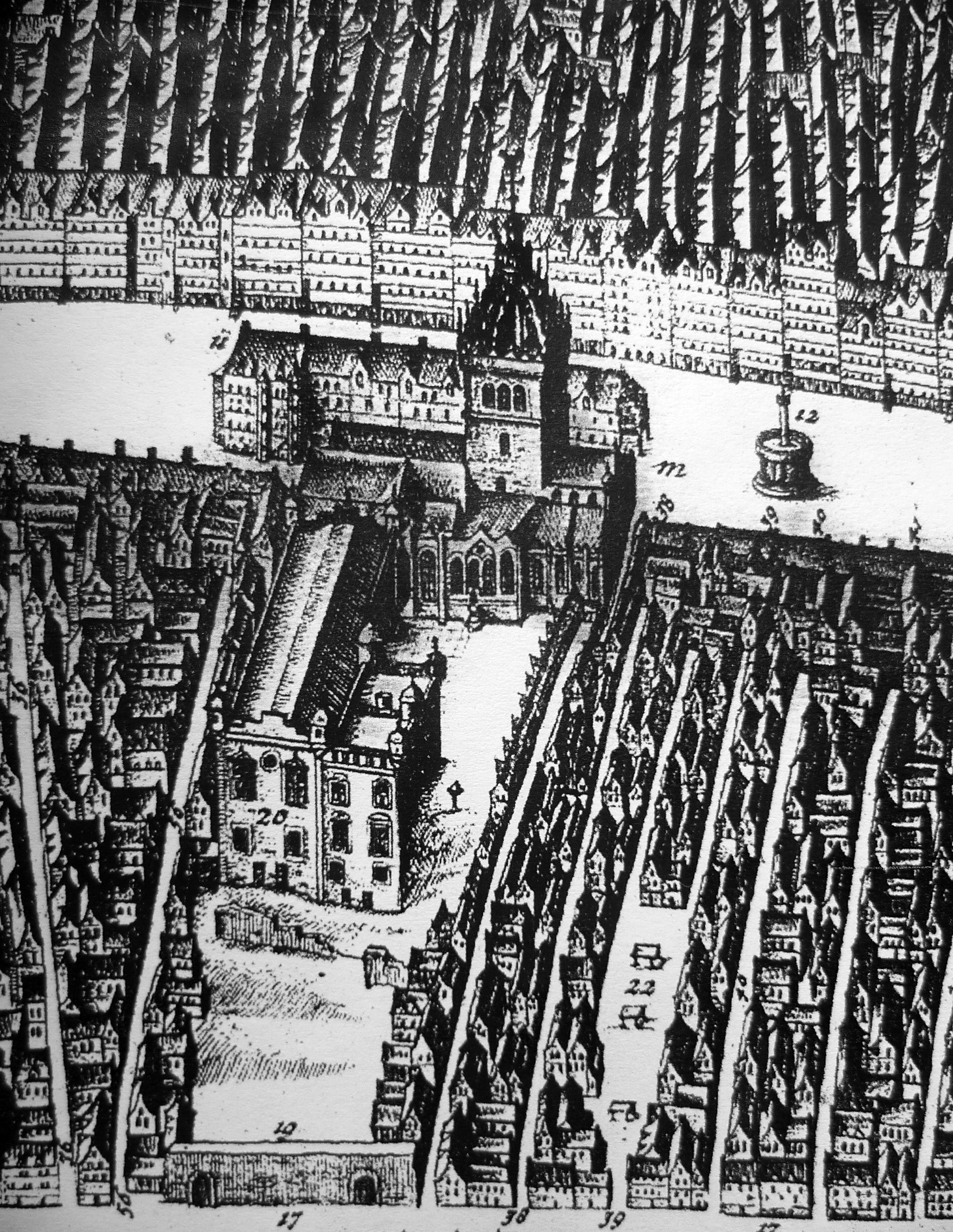
Parliament House, where the Convention of Estates met in March 1689

On 7 January 1689 the Scottish Privy Council asked William to take over government pending a Scottish Convention that would agree a settlement. 70 of the 125 delegates elected in March were classed as Presbyterian, with a tiny minority loyal to James; this made the convention a contest between Episcopalians and Presbyterians over control of the kirk and the limits of Royal authority.

On 12 March, James landed in Ireland and on 16th a Letter to the convention was read out, demanding obedience and threatening punishment for non-compliance. Public anger meant some Episcopalians stopped attending the convention, claiming to fear for their safety while others changed sides. Tensions were high, with the Duke of Gordon holding Edinburgh Castle for James and Viscount Dundee recruiting Highland levies. This exaggerated the Presbyterian majority in the Convention which met behind closed doors guarded by its own troops.

The Convention of the Scottish Estates met to consider letters received on 16 March 1689 from the two contenders for the Crown. On 4 April they voted to remove James VII from office, drawing on George Buchanan's argument on the contractual nature of monarchy.

Later that month, the Convention adopted the Claim of Right and the Article of Grievances, enumerating what they saw as the contemporary requirements of Scottish constitutional law. It also declared that, because of his actions in violation of these laws, James had forfeited the Scottish throne.

The English Parliament held James had 'abandoned' his throne the previous December, thereby rendering the position available to another; while in Scotland, On 4 April 1689 a Convention of the Three Estates declared that James VII “had acted irregularly” by assuming regal power “without ever taking the Coronation Oath required by Law”. Thus, he had “forfeited the Right to the Crown, and the Throne is become vacant”. This was a fundamental difference; if Parliament could decide James had forfeited his throne by actions having, in the words of the Claim of Right Act "Invaded the fundamentall Constitution of the Kingdome and altered it from a legall limited monarchy To ane arbitrary despotick power", monarchs derived legitimacy from Parliament, not God, ending the principle of divine right of kings.

In an attempt to preserve Episcopalianism, the Scottish Bishops proposed Union with England but this was rejected by the English Parliament. On 11 April, the Convention ended James' reign and adopted the Articles of Grievances and the Claim of Right Act that made Parliament the primary legislative power in Scotland.

On 11 May 1689, William and Mary accepted the Scottish throne and the Convention became a full Parliament on 5 June. Dundee's rising highlighted William's reliance on Presbyterian support and he ended attempts to retain the Bishops, leading to the 1690 Act of Settlement restoring Presbyterianism. The Glorious Revolution in Scotland resulted in greater independence for Parliament and kirk but the ending of Episcopacy isolated a significant part of the political class; this would be a major factor in debates over the 1707 Act of Union and the Scottish Jacobite movement.

== Parliament ==
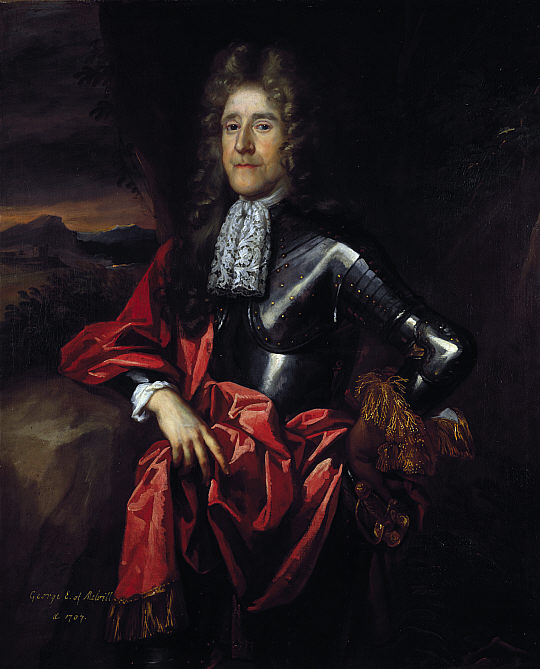
George Melville, 1st Earl of Melville, leading figure in the first Williamite government

Key figures in the new government were Lord Melville, who joined William in the Netherlands in 1683 after the Rye House Plot and the Earl of Stair, a former member of James VII's administration. In 1689, Melville was appointed Secretary of State for Scotland with Stair as Lord Advocate, a combination intended to minimise Presbyterian dominance of Parliament.

The first session was a stalemate over abolishing Episcopacy in the Kirk and the Committee of the Articles, an unelected body that decided what legislation Parliament could debate. As a result, Parliament refused to approve taxes or nominations for legal officers, effectively closing the law courts and William blocked implementation of legislation by withholding Royal Assent to Acts approved by Parliament.

A majority of MPs formed themselves into an anti-government group called the club, led by Sir James Montgomery, previously one of William's chief supporters but angered by Melville being preferred as Secretary of State. While some like Montgomery simply resented exclusion from office, most opposed the government on political grounds and primarily wanted to eliminate the Committee of the Articles. The government compromised by agreeing to remove bishops from the kirk but resisted abolition of the Committee of the Articles before Parliament was suspended on 2 August, following the Battle of Killiecrankie.

Parliament reconvened in April 1690 in an atmosphere of high tension due to the Jacobite war in Ireland, fears of an Irish invasion of Scotland and continuing unrest in the Highlands. An alleged Jacobite conspiracy called the Montgomery Plot was uncovered, involving Montgomery, the Marquess of Annandale and Lord Ross. In the resulting panic, Melville agreed to abolish the Committee of the Articles, although it is still unclear how serious the plot actually was. Its principal objective achieved, the Club disintegrated, and on 7 June Parliament approved an Act ending Episcopacy and a grant of taxes.

The constitutional settlement that emerged from the 1689 and 1690 Parliamentary sessions was less radical than in 1641. The Crown retained important prerogative powers, including the right to summon, prorogue and dissolve Parliament but in return abolition of the Committee of Articles gave Parliament control of the legislative agenda.

== Religious settlement ==
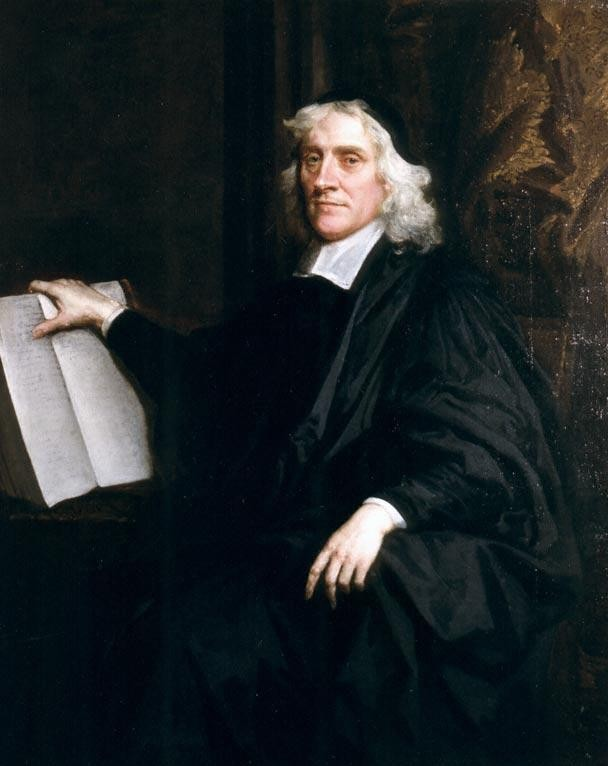
Archbishop Sharp; his killing in May 1679 was symptomatic of the deep divisions within the Scottish kirk

Conflicts between Protestors and Resolutioners during the Protectorate, then Episcopalians and Cameronians after 1660 had left deep divisions while also normalising the eviction of defeated opponents. The Kirk's General Assembly meeting in November 1690 was the first since 1654 and even before it convened, over 200 conformist and Episcopalian ministers had been removed from their livings.

This meant the Assembly was overwhelmingly composed of radical Presbyterians who rejected any measure of Episcopalianism or the reinstatement of those already evicted. Despite being a fellow Calvinist, William was more tolerant towards Episcopalians, seeing them as potential allies while recognising the dangers of alienating an important political constituency. However, the Assembly eliminated Episcopacy and created two commissions for the south and north of the Tay which over the next 25 years removed almost two-thirds of all ministers. The General Assembly of 1692 refused to reinstate even those Episcopalian ministers who pledged to accept Presbyterianism leaving many presbyteries with few or no parish clergy.

William issued two acts of indulgence in 1693 and 1695 restoring ministers who accepted him as king; nearly one hundred clergy took advantage of this and a further measure of indulgence in 1707 left only a small remnant of Jacobite Episcopalians and some Society people. The final settlement was closer to that of 1592 rather than the more radical position of 1649 and the degree of independence between Kirk and State remained ambiguous. Despite the theoretical abolition of lay patronage, heritors and elders retained the right to nominate candidates for their own parishes who could then be "called" by the congregation.

== Jacobite resistance ==
The Scottish Parliament was dominated by Presbyterians, with a small group of Stuart loyalists known as Jacobites from Jacobus, Latin for James. This included members of the Roman Catholic minority, conservative Episcopalians or those with personal ties such as Viscount Dundee, his military chief in Scotland. The vast majority were unenthusiastic about either James or William, while the Jacobites were also split between Protestant and Roman Catholic factions.

Dundee led a campaign in Scotland to support James' landing in Ireland, where clan rivalries or simple opportunism were often more important than allegiance to William or James. The Presbyterian Macleans joined the Jacobites in order to regain territories in Mull lost to the Campbells in the 1670s, while the Jacobite Keppoch MacDonalds tried to sack Inverness and were bought off only after Dundee intervened. Despite victory at Killiecrankie in July, the Jacobites suffered heavy losses including Dundee himself. Organised resistance ended with defeat at Battle of Cromdale on 1 May 1690, although it took another two years to enforce allegiance to the new regime.

== Assessment ==
The Glorious Revolution settled the dominance of the Presbyterians in the Church of Scotland and the Whigs in politics but alienated a significant segment of the political class. The Whig dominance continued in both Scotland and England well into the mid-eighteenth century.

As in England, the Revolution confirmed the ascendancy of Parliament over the Crown but by removing bishops from the Kirk, it alienated a significant segment of the political class. In the long-term, Episcopalianism rather than Highlander or Lowlander was a key determinant of Jacobite support in both 1715 and 1745. Scotland's involvement in the Nine Years' War and the War of the Spanish Succession ultimately led to the Acts of Union and the creation of Great Britain, as the danger of a divided succession between Scotland and England drove the need for a lasting resolution.

== Sources ==
- Belsham, William (1806). History of Great Britain, from the Revolution, 1688, to the Concluding of the Treaty of Amiens, 1802. R. Phillips.
- Bosher, JF (February 1994). "The Franco-Catholic Danger, 1660–1715". History. 79 (255): 5–30. doi:10.1111/j.1468-229X.1994.tb01587.x.
- Brown, Keith M.; Mann, Alastair J.; Tanner, Roland J., eds. (2005). Unconventional Procedure; Scottish Electoral Politics after the Revolution in The History of the Scottish Parliament: Parliament and Politics in Scotland, 1567 to 1707. Edinburgh University Press. ISBN 0748614958.
- Carrell, Severin; Bowcott, Owen (21 November 2016). "Scottish claim of right to be used in Brexit case against UK government". The Guardian.
- Coward, Barry (1980). The Stuart Age 1603–1714. Longman. ISBN 0582488338.
- Cullen, K. J., Famine in Scotland: The "Ill Years" of the 1690s (Edinburgh University Press, 2010), ISBN 0748638873.
- Davies, Gordon; Hardacre, Paul (May 1962). "The Restoration of the Scottish Episcopacy, 1660–1661". Journal of British Studies. 1 (2): 32–51. doi:10.1086/385441. S2CID 144583746.
- Ferguson, James (1887). Robert Ferguson the Plotter, or the Secret of the Rye-House Conspiracy and the Story of a Strange Career. Forgotten Books. ISBN 1334674760.
- Harris, Tim; Taylor, Stephen, eds. (2015). The Final Crisis of the Stuart Monarchy. Boydell & Brewer. ISBN 978-1783270446.
- Harris, Tim (2007). Revolution; the Great Crisis of the British Monarchy 1685–1720. Penguin. ISBN 978-0141016528.
- Hughes, Anne. "10 Great Misperceptions of the British Civil Wars". History Extra.
- Jackson, Claire (2003). Restoration Scotland, 1660–1690: Royalist Politics, Religion and Ideas. Boydell Press. ISBN 978-0851159300.
- Langford, P., The Eighteenth Century, 1688–1815 (Oxford: Oxford University Press, 1976).
- Lenman, Bruce (1995). The Jacobite Risings in Britain, 1689–1746. Scottish Cultural Press. ISBN 189821820X.
- Lynch, Michael (1992). Scotland: a New History. Pimlico Publishing. ISBN 0712698930.
- Mackie, JD; Lenman, Bruce; Parker, Geoffrey (1986). A History of Scotland. Hippocrene Books. ISBN 978-0880290401.
- McDonald, Alan (1998). The Jacobean Kirk, 1567–1625: Sovereignty, Polity and Liturgy. Routledge. ISBN 185928373X.
- Miller, John (1978). James II: a study in kingship (1991 ed.). Methuen. ISBN 978-0413652904.
- Mitchison, Rosalind (1990). Lordship to Patronage. Edinburgh University Press. ISBN 074860233X.
- Quinn, Stephen. "The Glorious Revolution". Economic History Association EH.net.
- Roberts, JL (2000). Clan, King and Covenant: The History of the Highland Clans from the Civil War to the Glencoe Massacre. Edinburgh University Press. ISBN 978-0748613939.
- Shukman, Ann (2012). Bishops and Covenanters: The Church in Scotland, 1688–1691. Berlinn. ISBN 978-1906566586.
- Spielvogel, Jackson J (1980). Western Civilization. Wadsworth Publishing. ISBN 1285436407.
- Szechi, Daniel (1994). The Jacobites: Britain and Europe, 1688–1788. Manchester University Press. ISBN 0719037743.
- Szechi, Daniel; Sankey, Margaret (November 2001). "Elite Culture and the Decline of Scottish Jacobitism 1716–1745". Past & Present (173).
- Wormsley, David (2015). James II: The Last Catholic King. Allen Lane. ISBN 978-0141977065.
