= Convention of Estates (1689) =

1689 Scottish constitutional convention

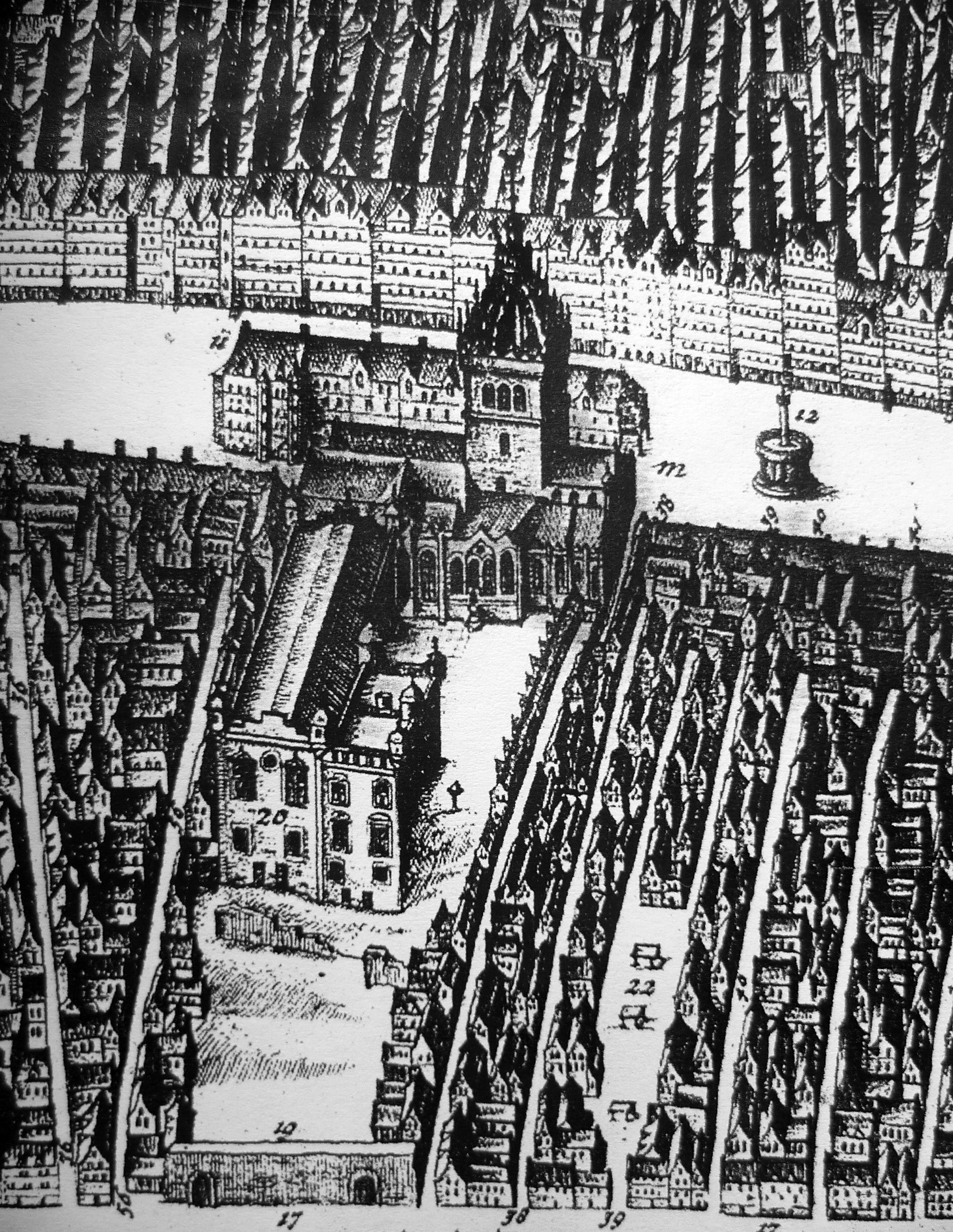
Parliament House, where the Convention of Estates met in March 1689

The 1689 Convention of Estates sat between 16 March 1689 and 5 June 1689 to determine the settlement of the Scottish throne, following the deposition of James VII (II of England) following the Dutch invasion by force of arms by Prince William of Orange and his wife Mary (daughter of James II) in the so called English 1688 Glorious Revolution. The Convention of the Estates of Scotland a sister-institution to Parliament of Scotland, comprising the three estates of bishops, barons and representatives of the Scots burghs. Historically, it had been summoned by the king of Scots for the limited purpose of raising taxes, and could not pass other legislation. Unlike the English Convention Parliament of 1689, the 1689 Scottish Convention was also a contest for control of the Church of Scotland or Kirk.

Scotland played no part in the landing and Dutch invasion by "force of arms" by Prince William of Orange and his wife Mary (daughter of James II) in England and there was little enthusiasm for William and Mary, by November 1688 only a tiny minority actively supported James. Many of William of Orange's exile advisors were Scots, including Melville, Argyll, his personal chaplain, William Carstares, and Gilbert Burnet, his chief propagandist. News of James's flight led to celebrations and anti-Catholic riots in Edinburgh and Glasgow and on 7 January 1689, the Scottish Privy Council asked William to take over, pending a Constitutional Convention to agree a settlement.

In February, an English Convention appointed William of Orange and his wife Mary as joint monarchs of England. As James had not been present in the kingdom when he fled to France. The Scots had to proceed on a Scots Constitutional basis. In Scotland elections were held in March 1689 for a Scottish Convention; 'Conventions of the Estates of Scotland' were identical to Parliaments of Scotland in composition but only discussed specific issues, the previous one held in 1678 to approve taxes. Of the 125 delegates elected, 75 were classed as Presbyterian, 50 as Episcopalian, making the Convention a contest over control of the Church of Scotland, as well as the limits of royal authority.

William's nominee, the 3rd Duke of Hamilton, was elected President of the Constitutional Convention, although his son remained loyal to James. Despite being a minority, the Episcopalians were hopeful of retaining control of the Kirk since William supported the retention of bishops. However, on 12 March, James landed in Ireland and on 16th, a Letter to the Convention was read out, demanding obedience and threatening punishment for non-compliance.

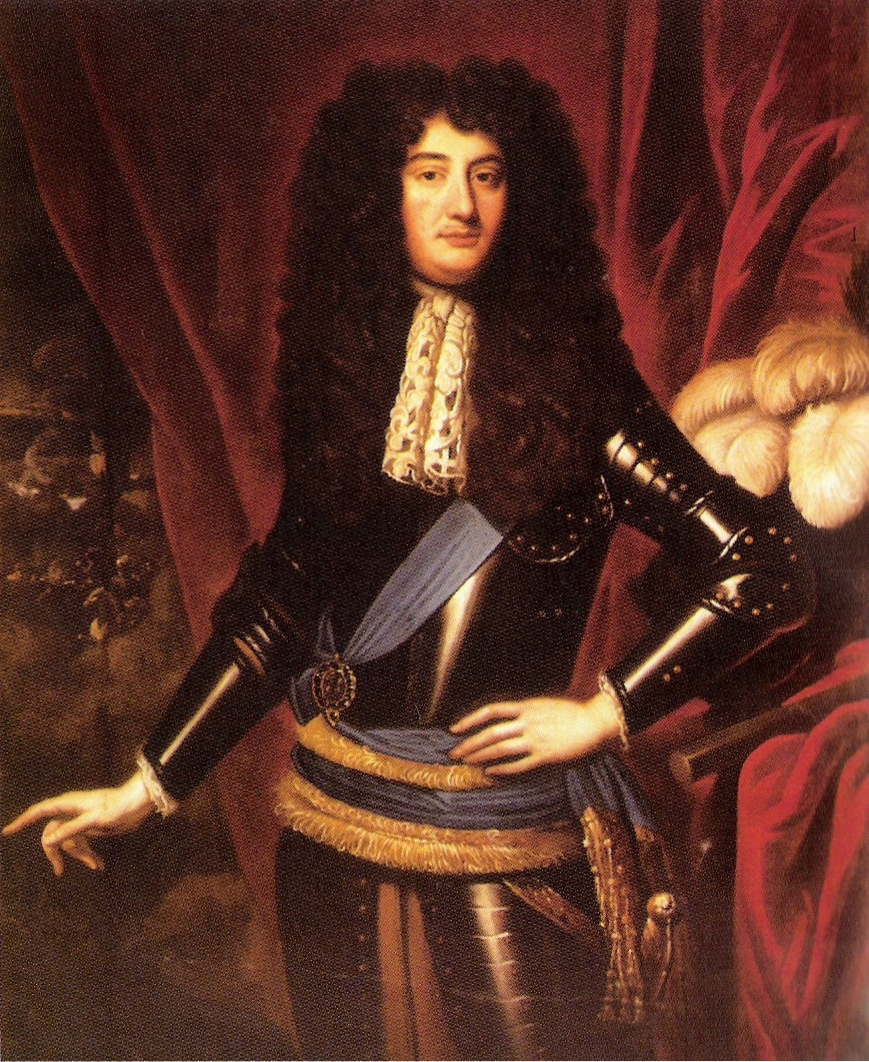
William, 3rd Duke of Hamilton who was elected President of the Convention

Public anger at this meant some Episcopalians stopped attending the Convention, claiming to fear for their safety while others changed sides. Tensions were high, with the Duke of Gordon holding Edinburgh Castle for James and Viscount Dundee recruiting Highland levies. This exaggerated the Presbyterian majority in the Convention which met behind closed doors guarded by its own troops.

The English Parliament held James 'abandoned' his throne by fleeing from London to France; since the same argument could not be used in Scotland, the Convention argued he (Scots) "FOREFAULTED" (forfeited) it by his actions, listed in the Scots Articles of Grievances and "CLAIM of RIGHT" Act 1689. This was a fundamental change; if the Parliament of Scotland could decide James had "FOREFAULTED" (forfeited) his throne, Scotland's monarchs derived legitimacy from the Convention of the Estates of Scotland (later made a Parliament of Scotland), not God, ending in Scotland the principle of divine right of kings.

The Scots throne was offered to Mary and William, who was granted regal power on the basis he held the throne de facto, by right of conquest. In an attempt to preserve Episcopalianism, the Scottish bishops proposed Union with England but this was rejected by the English Parliament. On 11 April, the Convention ended James' reign and adopted the Articles of Grievances and Claim of Right Act, making Parliament the primary legislative power in Scotland.

On 11 May 1689, William and Mary accepted the Scottish throne and the Convention became a full Parliament on 5 June. The 1689 Jacobite Rising highlighted the new regimes' reliance on Presbyterian support and led to the final expulsion of bishops from the Kirk in the 1690 Act of Settlement. The ending of Episcopacy isolated a significant part of the Scottish political class; in the 18th century, Nonjuring Episcopalians were a key support base of the Scottish Jacobite movement.

James and the Jacobites viewed the Convention as "illegal" and argued that the declaration of forfeiture was not valid because the authority of a Scottish Convention of Estates was limited to revenue raising measures and the Convention had not been called by the rightful king.

== Sources ==
- Barnes, Robert P (1973). "James VII's Forfeiture of the Scottish Throne". Albion: A Quarterly Journal Concerned with British Studies. 5 (4): 299–313. doi:10.2307/4048254. JSTOR 4048254.
- Coward, Barry (1980). The Stuart Age: England 1603–1714 (1994 ed.). Longman. ISBN 978-0582067226.
- Harris, Tim (2006). Revolution: The Great Crisis of the British Monarchy 1685-1720. Allen Lane.
- Jackson, Clare (2003). Restoration Scotland, 1660-1690: royalist politics, religion and ideas. Boydell Press.
- Lynch, Michael (1992). Scotland: a New History. Pimlico Publishing. ISBN 0712698930.
- Szechi, Daniel (1994). The Jacobites: Britain and Europe, 1688-1788. Manchester University Press. ISBN 0719037743.
- Szechi, Daniel, Sankey, Margaret (November 2001). "Elite Culture and the Decline of Scottish Jacobitism 1716-1745". Past & Present (173).
