= List of parliaments of Scotland =

This is a list of the parliaments, general councils and conventions of the Estates of the Kingdom of Scotland.

| Monarch | Date | Place | Type of meeting |
|---|---|---|---|
| Margaret | 17 March 1290 | Birgham | Colloquium |
| John Balliol | 9 February 1293 | Scone | Parliament |
| John Balliol | 2 August 1293 | Stirling | Parliament |
| Robert I | 16 March 1309 | St Andrews | Parliament |
| Robert I | 1312, c. 7 April | Inchture | Parliament |
| Robert I | 29 October 1312 | Inverness | Council |
| Robert I | 6 November 1314 | Cambuskenneth | Parliament |
| Robert I | 1316, c. 3 March | Edinburgh | ?Parliament |
| Robert I | 4 April 1317 | Stirling | Council |
| Robert I | 14 June 1317 | Scone | Council |
| Robert I | 3 December 1318 | Scone | Parliament |
| Robert I | 10 December 1319 | Berwick | Council |
| Robert I | 6 April 1320 | Arbroath | Parliament |
| Robert I | 1320, August? | Scone | Parliament |
| Robert I | 9 July 1321 | Perth | Parliament |
| Robert I | 7 June 1323 | Berwick | Council |
| Robert I | 25 July, (?)23 August 1323 | Scone | Parliament |
| Robert I | 7 November 1324 | Berwick | Council |
| Robert I | 26 March 1326 | Scone | Parliament |
| Robert I | 15 July 1326 | Cambuskenneth | Parliament |
| Robert I | 28 February 1328 | Edinburgh | Parliament |
| David II | 29 March 1330 | Perth | Parliament |
| David II | 26 November 1331 | Scone | Parliament |
| David II | 9 February 1334 | Edinburgh | Parliament |
| David II | April? 1335 | Dairsie | Parliament |
| David II | 24 October 1339 | Perth | Parliament |
| David II | 17, 22, 24 September 1341 | Scone | Parliament |
| David II | 14, 21 February 1342 | Aberdeen | Council |
| David II | 18 June 1342 | Restennet | Council |
| David II | 7 June 1344 | Scone | Parliament |
| David II | 12 April 1345 | Edinburgh | Council |
| David II | 3 May 1346 | Perth | Council |
| David II | 12 November 1347 | Dundee | Council |
| David II | 1 April 1354 | Inverkeithing | Council |
| David II | 17 January 1357 | Perth | Council |
| David II | 26 September 1357 | Edinburgh | General Council |
| David II | 6, 10, 11 November 1357 | Scone | Council |
| David II | 20 January, 6 February 1358 | Edinburgh | Council |
| David II | 12 March 1358 | Perth | Council |
| David II | 31 August 1358 | Edinburgh | Council |
| David II | 12 November 1358 | Scone | Parliament |
| David II | 5 April 1359 | Dundee | Council |
| David II | 3, 26 October 1359 | Scone | Parliament |
| David II | 12 April 1360 | Perth | Council |
| David II | 16 November 1360 | Edinburgh | Council |
| David II | 12 September 1362 | Aberdeen | Council |
| David II | 4 March 1364 | Scone | Parliament |
| David II | 11, 13 January 1365 | Perth | General Council |
| David II | 24 July 1365 | Perth | Council |
| David II | 14 January 1366 | Perth | Council |
| David II | 8 May 1366 | Holyrood | Council |
| David II | 20, 27 July 1366 | Scone | Parliament |
| David II | 16 January 1367 | Perth | Council |
| David II | 27 September, 3, 26 October 1367 | Scone | Parliament |
| David II | 17 February 1368 | Edinburgh | Council |
| David II | 12, 22 June 1368 | Scone | Parliament |
| David II | 9 December 1368 | Perth | Council |
| David II | 6 March 1369 | Perth | Parliament |
| David II | 16 September (?)1369 | Edinburgh | Council |
| David II | 18 February 1370 | Perth | Parliament |
| David II | 23 October 1370 | Perth | Parliament |
| Robert II | 26, 27 March 1371 | Scone | Parliament |
| Robert II | 2, 9 March 1372 | Scone | Parliament |
| Robert II | 7 October 1372 | Stirling | Council |
| Robert II | 3, 4 April 1373 | Scone | Parliament |
| Robert II | 19 October 1378 | Scone | Parliament |
| Robert II | 6, 7 June 1382 | Perth | General Council |
| Robert II | 22 October 1382 | Scone | Parliament |
| Robert II | 21 September 1384 | Glasgow | Council |
| Robert II | 1384, November? | Holyrood | Council |
| Robert II | 28 February 1385 | Stirling | Council |
| Robert II | 1385, April? | Edinburgh | General Council |
| Robert II | 17 June 1385 | Edinburgh | General Council |
| Robert II | 18 August 1388 | Linlithgow | General Council |
| Robert II | 1, 11 December 1388 | Edinburgh | General Council |
| Robert II | 29 March (?)1389 | Scone | Parliament |
| Robert II | 1389, March? | Holyrood | Parliament |
| Robert III | 8 August 1390 | Scone | Council |
| Robert III | 7, 18 March 1391 | Scone | Parliament |
| Robert III | 25, 26 March 1392 | Perth | General Council |
| Robert III | 24 October 1393 | Perth | General Council |
| Robert III | 8 March 1394 | Scone | Parliament |
| Robert III | 31 August 1394 | Edinburgh | General Council |
| Robert III | 11 October 1395 | Stirling | General Council |
| Robert III | 1397? | Stirling | General Council |
| Robert III | 22 April 1398 | Perth | General Council |
| Robert III | 27 January 1399 | Perth | General Council |
| Robert III | 20 November 1399 | Linlithgow | General Council |
| Robert III | 10 February 1400 | Edinburgh | Parliament |
| Robert III | 21, 28 February 1401 | Scone | Parliament |
| Robert III | 12 May 1401 | Linlithgow | ? |
| Robert III | April 1401, April 1402 | Scone | Parliament |
| Robert III | 16 May 1402 | Edinburgh | General Council |
| Robert III | 28 April 1404 | Linlithgow | General Council |
| James I | July 1404, March 1406 | Perth | Parliament |
| James I | June? 1406 | Perth | General Council |
| James I | March 1408, May 1409 | Perth | General Council |
| James I | 20 July 1408 | Perth | Council |
| James I | May? 1409 | Perth | General Council |
| James I | 14 March 1410 | Holyrood | General Council |
| James I | 13 March 1411 | Edinburgh | General Council |
| James I | Autumn? 1411 | ? | General Council |
| James I | Autumn? 1412 | ? | General Council |
| James I | 17 March 1416 | Perth | General Council |
| James I | 26 June 1417 | Perth | General Council |
| James I | 2, 3 October 1418 | Perth | General Council |
| James I | 1419, before 28 July | ? | (?)General Council |
| James I | July 1420, July 1421 | ? | General Council |
| James I | 29 July 1422 | Stirling | General Council |
| James I | 20 May 1423 | Perth | General Council |
| James I | 19? August 1423 | Inverkeithing | (?)General Council |
| James I | 26 May, 1 June 1424 | Perth | Parliament |
| James I | 12, 17 March 1425 | Perth | Parliament |
| James I | 11 March, 26 May, 30 September 1426 | Perth, Edinburgh | Parliament |
| James I | 14 January 1427 | Edinburgh | Parliament |
| James I | 1 July 1427 | Perth | Parliament |
| James I | 1427/1428 | Inverness | Parliament |
| James I | 1, 5 March 1428 | Perth | General Council |
| James I | 12, 19 July 1428 | Perth | General Council |
| James I | 26 April 1429 | Perth | Parliament |
| James I | 1 October 1429 | Perth | General Council |
| James I | 6, 10, 17 March 1430 | Perth | Parliament |
| James I | 30 January, 13 February 1431 | Perth | Parliament |
| James I | 15, 16, 20 October 1431 | Perth | Parliament |
| James I | 10 March 1432 | Perth | Parliament |
| James I | 27 May 1432 | Perth | Parliament |
| James I | 10 October 1432 | Perth | Parliament |
| James I | October? 1433 | Perth | General Council |
| James I | 1, 2 March 1434 | Stirling | Parliament |
| James I | 10, 15 January, 24 June 1436 | Perth | Parliament |
| James I | 22 October 1436 | Edinburgh | General Council |
| James I | 4 February 1437 | Perth | General Council |
| James II | 25 March 1437 | Edinburgh | Parliament |
| James II | 6 May 1437 | Stirling | General Council |
| James II | 27 November 1438 | Edinburgh | General Council |
| James II | 13 March 1439 | Stirling | General Council |
| James II | 4 September 1439 | Stirling | General Council |
| James II | 20 February 1440 | Edinburgh | General Council |
| James II | 2, 10 August 1440 | Stirling | General Council |
| James II | 3 April 1441 | Edinburgh | General Council |
| James II | 1 June 1441 | Edinburgh | General Council |
| James II | March 1442 | Perth | General Council |
| James II | 8 February 1443 | Stirling | General Council |
| James II | 4 November 1443 | Stirling | General Council |
| James II | 6, 7 February 1444 | Stirling | General Council |
| James II | 14, 28 June, 2 July 1445 | Perth/Edinburgh | Parliament |
| James II | May/July 1446 | Edinburgh | General Council |
| James II | 4 April 1449 | Stirling | General Council |
| James II | 19 January, 2 February 1450 | Edinburgh | Parliament |
| James II | 4, 12 May 1450 | Perth | General Council |
| James II | 28 June, 8 July 1451 | Edinburgh | Parliament |
| James II | 13, 26 October 1451 | Stirling | Parliament |
| James II | 12 June, 8 July 1452 | Edinburgh | Parliament |
| James II | 26 August 1452 | Edinburgh | Parliament |
| James II | 21 March 1453 | Edinburgh | General Council |
| James II | 16, 18 July 1454 | Edinburgh | Parliament |
| James II | 9, 17 June, 16 July 1455 | Edinburgh | Parliament |
| James II | 4 August, 13 October 1455 | Edinburgh/Stirling | Parliament |
| James II | 19 October 1456 | Edinburgh | General Council |
| James II | 6 March 1458 | Edinburgh | Parliament |
| James II | 2 October 1459 | Perth | Parliament |
| James II | 4 July 1460 | Edinburgh | Parliament |
| James III | 2, 11, 14 March 1461 | Edinburgh | Parliament |
| James III | 24 June 1462 | Aberdeen | Parliament |
| James III | 19 October 1462 | Edinburgh | Parliament |
| James III | 9 March 1463 | Edinburgh | Parliament |
| James III | 12 October 1463 | Edinburgh | Parliament |
| James III | 13 January 1464 | Edinburgh | Parliament |
| James III | 11 October 1464 | Edinburgh | (?)General Council |
| James III | 7, 13 October 1466, 31 January 1467 | Edinburgh | Parliament |
| James III | 12, 15 October 1467, 12 January 1468 | Edinburgh/Stirling | Parliament |
| James III | (?)1468 | (?)Edinburgh | Parliament |
| James III | 20, 27 November 1469 | Edinburgh | Parliament |
| James III | 6, 13 May, 2 August 1471 | Edinburgh | Parliament |
| James III | 20 January, 17 February 1472 | Edinburgh | Parliament |
| James III | 8 April, 23 July, 2 August 1473 | Edinburgh | Parliament |
| James III | 11 October 1473 | Edinburgh | Parliament |
| James III | 9 May, 6 August 1474 | Edinburgh | Parliament |
| James III | 6 October 1474 | Edinburgh | Parliament |
| James III | 20 November, (?)1 December 1475 | Edinburgh | Parliament |
| James III | 1, 10 July, 4 October 1476 | Edinburgh | Parliament |
| James III | 6 April, 1, 12 June, 22 October, 20 November 1478 | Edinburgh | Parliament |
| James III | 1, 20 March 1479 | Edinburgh | Parliament |
| James III | 4 October 1479, 2 April 1481, 18 March 1482 | Edinburgh | Parliament |
| James III | 2 December 1482, 1 March, 27 June, 6 October 1483 | Edinburgh | Parliament |
| James III | 16 February, 17 May, 11 October 1484 | Edinburgh | Parliament |
| James III | 21 March, 9 April, 26 May 1485 | Edinburgh | Parliament |
| James III | 1 October 1487, 11 January, 21 February 1488 | Edinburgh | Parliament |
| James IV | 6 October 1488, 14, 26 January 1489 | Edinburgh | Parliament |
| James IV | 26 June, 4 July 1489 | Edinburgh | Parliament |
| James IV | 3, 15 February 1490 | Edinburgh | Parliament |
| James IV | 28 April, 2 August 1491 | Edinburgh | Parliament |
| James IV | 6, 20 February, 7 May 1492 | Edinburgh | Parliament |
| James IV | 8 May, 26 June 1493 | Edinburgh | Parliament |
| James IV | 27 November 1494 | Edinburgh | Parliament |
| James IV | 13 June 1496 | Edinburgh | Parliament |
| James IV | 11 March 1504, 3, 16 February 1506 | Edinburgh | Parliament |
| James IV | 8 May 1509 | Edinburgh | Parliament |
| James V | 26 November 1513 | Perth | General Council |
| James V | 8 May 1515 | Edinburgh | Parliament |
| James V | 12 July 1515 | Edinburgh | Parliament |
| James V | 4 July 1516 | Edinburgh | Parliament |
| James V | 13, 22 November 1516 | Edinburgh | Parliament |
| James V | May? 1517 | Edinburgh | Parliament |
| James V | 24 July, (?)12 August 1522 | Edinburgh | Parliament |
| James V | 2 September 1523 | Stirling | Parliament |
| James V | 10 May 1524 | Edinburgh | Parliament |
| James V | 14 November 1524, 15, 25 February 1525 | Edinburgh | Parliament |
| James V | 6 July 1525, 15 January 1526 | Edinburgh | Parliament |
| James V | 12, 25 June 1526 | Edinburgh | Parliament |
| James V | 12, 25 November 1526 | Edinburgh | Parliament |
| James V | 7, 10 May 1527 | Edinburgh | Parliament |
| James V | 2 September 1528, 23 January 1529 | Edinburgh | Parliament |
| James V | 24 April, 26 May, 9 June 1531 | Edinburgh | Parliament |
| James V | 13, 17 May 1532 | Edinburgh | Parliament |
| James V | 28 July 1533, 26 January 1535 | Edinburgh | Parliament |
| James V | 7, 17 June 1535 | Edinburgh | Parliament |
| James V | 29 April 1536 | Edinburgh | Parliament |
| James V | 11 March 1538, 3 February, (?)8 July 1539 | Edinburgh | Parliament |
| James V | 3 December 1540, 14 March 1541, 3 February 1543 | Edinburgh | Parliament |
| Mary | 12, 15 March 1543 | Edinburgh | Parliament |
| Mary | 3 December 1543, 20 May 1544 | Edinburgh | Parliament |
| Mary | 6 November, 12 December 1544 | Edinburgh | Parliament |
| Mary | 26, 29 June 1545 | Stirling | Convention of Estates |
| Mary | 2, 28 September 1545, 30 February, 30 July, 16 August 1546 | Edinburgh, Linlithgow | Parliament |
| Mary | 10 June 1546 | Stirling | Convention of Estates |
| Mary | 18 March 1547 | Edinburgh | Convention of Estates |
| Mary | 8 September 1547 | Monktonhall | Convention of Estates |
| Mary | 12 June 1548 | Edinburgh | Parliament |
| Mary | 7 July 1548 | Haddington | Parliament |
| Mary | 3 July 1549 | Edinburgh | Convention of Estates |
| Mary | 29 May 1551 | Edinburgh | Parliament |
| Mary | 1 February 1552 | Edinburgh | Parliament |
| Mary | 12 April 1554 | Edinburgh | Parliament |
| Mary | 20 June 1555 | Edinburgh | Parliament |
| Mary | 14 December 1557 | Edinburgh | Parliament |
| Mary | 29 November, 5 December 1558 | Edinburgh | Parliament |
| Mary | 1 August 1560 | Edinburgh | Parliament |
| Mary | 22 December 1561 | Edinburgh | Convention of Estates |
| Mary | 4 June 1563 | Edinburgh | Parliament |
| Mary | 15 December 1564 | Edinburgh | Parliament |
| Mary | 6 October 1566 | Edinburgh | Convention of Estates |
| Mary | 14, 19 April 1567 | Edinburgh | Parliament |
| James VI | 15 December 1567, 16 August 1568, 17 November 1569 | Edinburgh | Parliament |
| James VI | 28 July, 1 August 1569 | Perth | Convention of Estates |
| James VI | 12, 17 July 1570 | Edinburgh | Convention of Estates |
| James VI | 13 June 1571 | Edinburgh | Parliament |
| James VI | 28 August 1571 | Stirling | Parliament |
| James VI | 5, 7 September 1571 | Stirling | Convention of Estates |
| James VI | 24, 25 November 1572 | Edinburgh | Convention of Estates |
| James VI | 26 January 1573 | Edinburgh | Parliament |
| James VI | 30 April 1573 | Holyrood | Parliament |
| James VI | 5 March 1575 | Holyrood | Convention of Estates |
| James VI | 8 March, 31 August 1578 | Stirling | Convention of Estates |
| James VI | 12 June 1578 | Stirling | Convention of Estates |
| James VI | 15, 25 July 1578 | Stirling | Parliament |
| James VI | 16 July 1578 | Stirling | Convention of Estates |
| James VI | 15 November 1578 | Stirling | Convention of Estates |
| James VI | 15, 25 January 1579 | Stirling | Convention of Estates |
| James VI | 10, 25 March 1579 | Stirling | Parliament |
| James VI | 12, 21 March 1579 | Stirling | Convention of Estates |
| James VI | 7, 8 August 1579 | Stirling | Convention of Estates |
| James VI | 20 October, 11 November 1579 | Edinburgh | Parliament |
| James VI | 26 February, 2 April 1581 | Holyrood | Convention of Estates |
| James VI | 24 October, 29 November 1581 | Edinburgh | Parliament |
| James VI | 11, 13 July 1582 | Perth | Convention of Estates |
| James VI | 19 October 1582 | Holyrood | Convention of Estates |
| James VI | 19 April 1583 | Holyrood | Convention of Estates |
| James VI | 24 October, 8 November 1583, 19 May, 20, 22 August 1584 | Edinburgh | Parliament |
| James VI | 7 December 1583 | Holyrood | Convention of Estates |
| James VI | 31 July 1585 | St Andrews | Convention of Estates |
| James VI | 1, 4, 10 December 1585 | Linlithgow | Parliament |
| James VI | 15 April 1586 | Holyrood | ?Convention of Estates |
| James VI | 23 September 1586 | Holyrood | ?Convention of Estates |
| James VI | 20 December 1586 | Holyrood | Convention of Estates |
| James VI | 10, 15 May 1587 | Holyrood | Convention of Estates |
| James VI | 8, 29 July 1587 | Edinburgh | Parliament |
| James VI | 4 April 1588 | Holyrood | Convention of Estates |
| James VI | 27 July 1588 | Holyrood | Convention of Estates |
| James VI | 21 May 1589 | Edinburgh | Convention of Estates |
| James VI | August 1589 | Stirling | Convention of Estates |
| James VI | 15 May 1590 | Holyrood | Convention of Estates |
| James VI | 12 June 1590 | Holyrood | Convention of Estates |
| James VI | 29 July 1590 | Holyrood | Convention of Estates |
| James VI | 6 May 1591 | Edinburgh | Convention of Estates |
| James VI | 6 August 1591 | Edinburgh | Convention of Estates |
| James VI | 3 April, 24, 25, 29 May 1592 | Edinburgh | Parliament |
| James VI | 20 April 1592 | ? | Convention of Estates |
| James VI | 3 April, 1, 9 June, 4 July 1593 | Edinburgh | Parliament |
| James VI | 11, 12 September 1593 | Stirling | Convention of Estates |
| James VI | 31 October 1593 | Linlithgow | Convention of Estates |
| James VI | 12 November 1593 | Edinburgh | Convention of Estates |
| James VI | 23, 26 November 1593 | Holyrood | Convention of Estates |
| James VI | 27 December 1593, 17 January 1594 | Holyrood | Convention of Estates |
| James VI | 18, 21 January 1594 | Holyrood/Edinburgh | Convention of Estates |
| James VI | 22 April, 20, 30 May, 8 June 1594 | Edinburgh | Parliament |
| James VI | 29 April 1594 | Edinburgh | Convention of Estates |
| James VI | 10 September 1594 | Holyrood | Convention of Estates |
| James VI | 28, 29 November 1594 | Holyrood | Convention of Estates |
| James VI | 15 March 1595 | Holyrood | Convention of Estates |
| James VI | 22, 24, 25 May 1596 | Holyrood | Convention of Estates |
| James VI | August 1596 | Falkland | Convention of Estates |
| James VI | 29 September 1596 | Dunfermline | Convention of Estates |
| James VI | 30 November 1596 | Edinburgh | Convention of Estates |
| James VI | 13 December 1596 | Edinburgh | Convention of Estates |
| James VI | 21, 22 December 1596 | Linlithgow | Convention of Estates |
| James VI | 1 January 1597 | Edinburgh | Convention of Estates |
| James VI | 6, 7, 8 January 1597 | Holyrood | Convention of Estates |
| James VI | 3, 4, 5 March 1597 | Perth | Convention of Estates |
| James VI | 13 May 1597 | Dundee | Convention of Estates |
| James VI | 28 October 1597 | Linlithgow | Convention of Estates |
| James VI | 1 November 1597 | Edinburgh | Parliament |
| James VI | 29, 30 June 1598 | Holyrood | Convention of Estates |
| James VI | 17 August 1598 | Dalkeith | Convention of Estates |
| James VI | 30 October 1598 | ? | Convention of Estates |
| James VI | 14 December 1598 | Holyrood | Convention of Estates |
| James VI | 1 February 1599 | Holyrood | Convention of Estates |
| James VI | 2 March 1599 | Holyrood | Convention of Estates |
| James VI | 18? May 1599 | Holyrood | Convention of Estates |
| James VI | 31 July 1599 | Falkland | Convention of Estates |
| James VI | 11, 14 December 1599 | Holyrood | Convention of Estates |
| James VI | 27 March 1600 | Perth | Convention of Estates |
| James VI | 1, 4, 11, 15 November 1600 | Edinburgh | Parliament |
| James VI | 10 February 1601 | Holyrood | Convention of Estates |
| James VI | 11 September 1601 | Perth | Convention of Estates |
| James VI | 2 February 1602 | Holyrood | Convention of Estates |
| James VI | June 1602 | Perth | Convention of Estates |
| James VI | 5 July 1603 | Haddington | Convention of Estates |
| James VI | 10 April, 3, 11 July 1604 | Edinburgh/Perth | Parliament |
| James VI | 7 June, 3, 9 July 1605 | Edinburgh/Perth | Parliament |
| James VI | 7 June 1605 | Edinburgh | Convention of Estates |
| James VI | 18 March, 2, 11 August 1607 | Edinburgh | Parliament |
| James VI | 10 May, 17, 24 June 1608 | Edinburgh | Parliament |
| James VI | 20 May 1608 | Edinburgh | Convention of Estates |
| James VI | 26, 27 January 1609 | Edinburgh | Convention of Estates |
| James VI | 12–23 October 1612 | Edinburgh | Parliament |
| James VI | 30 April 1616 | Edinburgh | Convention of Estates |
| James VI | 22 May 1616 | ? | Convention of Estates |
| James VI | 7 March 1617 | Edinburgh | Convention of Estates |
| James VI | 27 May–28 June 1617 | Edinburgh | Parliament |
| James VI | 25, 26 June 1621 | Edinburgh | Convention of Estates |
| James VI | 1 June–4 August 1621 | Edinburgh | Parliament |
| James VI | 9 July 1623 | Edinburgh | Convention of Estates |
| Charles I | 27 October–2 November 1625 | Edinburgh | Convention of Estates |
| Charles I | 1628–33 | Edinburgh | Parliament |
| Charles I | 28–31 July, 2–4, 7 August 1630 | Holyrood | Convention of Estates |
| Charles I | 15 May 1639 – 17 November 1641 | Edinburgh | Parliament |
| Charles I | 22 June 1643 – 24 May 1644 | Edinburgh | Convention of Estates |
| Charles I | 4 June 1644 – 27 March 1647 | Edinburgh, Stirling, Perth, St Andrews | Parliament |
| Charles I | 2 March 1648 – 6 June 1651 | Edinburgh, Perth, Stirling | Parliament |
| Charles II | 1 January 1661 – 9 October 1663 (Restoration) | Edinburgh | Parliament |
| Charles II | 2–4 August 1665 | Edinburgh | Convention of Estates |
| Charles II | 9–23 January 1667 | Edinburgh | Convention of Estates |
| Charles II | 19 October 1669 – 3 March 1674 | Edinburgh | Parliament |
| Charles II | 26 June–11 July 1678 | Edinburgh | Convention of Estates |
| Charles II | 28 July, 17 September 1681, 1 March 1682 | Edinburgh | Parliament |
| James VII | 23 April 1685 – 16 August 1686 | Edinburgh | Parliament |
| William and Mary | 14 March 1689 | Edinburgh | Convention of Estates |
| William and Mary | 5 June 1689 – 18 August 1702 | Edinburgh | Parliament |
| Anne | 6 May 1703 – 25 March 1707 | Edinburgh | Parliament |

== See also ==
- List of acts of the Parliament of Scotland
- List of parliaments of England
- List of parliaments of Ireland
- List of parliaments of the United Kingdom
