= Convention of the Estates of Scotland =

Limited parallel institution to the pre-union Parliament of the Kingdom of Scotland

The Convention of Estates of Scotland was a sister institution to the Scottish Parliament which sat from the early sixteenth century. Initially, it was only attended by the clergy and nobles, but the burgh commissioners were later added. The Convention of Estates differed from Parliament in that it could be summoned by the King for the limited purpose of raising taxation, but could not pass other legislation.

Like its predecessor General Council it played an important role in political and legislative affairs in Scotland in the sixteenth and seventeenth centuries.

During the Glorious Revolution in Scotland, the Scottish Privy Council asked the King of England, William of Orange, to summon the Convention of Estates of 1689 to determine the throne of Scotland. It offered it to William and Mary, adopting the Articles of Grievances and Claim of Right Act 1689, and transformed itself into a full parliament.

== See also ==
- List of parliaments of Scotland (includes Conventions of Estates)
- Commissioner (Scottish Parliament)
- Convention of Estates of Scotland (1689)
- Claim of Right Act 1689
- Three Estates of Scotland
