= George Melville, 1st Earl of Melville =

Scottish peer and politician

The Right Honourable The Earl of Melville
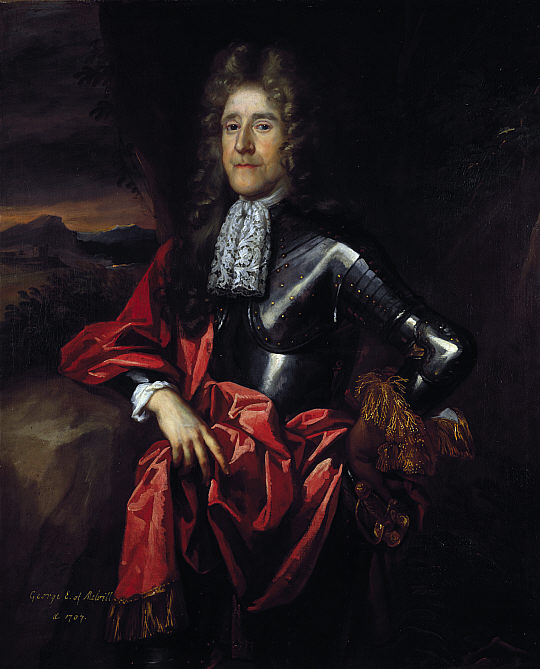

Lord High Commissioner
- In office 1690–1690
- Monarchs: William II and Mary II
- Preceded by: The Duke of Hamilton
- Succeeded by: The Duke of Hamilton

Keeper of the Privy Seal of Scotland
- In office 1693–1695
- Monarchs: William II and Mary II
- Preceded by: The Lord Carmichael
- Succeeded by: The Duke of Queensberry

Personal details
- Born: 1636
- Died: 20 May 1707 (aged 71)
- Spouse: Catherine Leslie-Melville
- Children: Anne Melville; Alexander Melville, Lord Raith; Lady Margaret Melville; David Leslie, 3rd Earl of Leven; James Melville
- Parents: John Melville, 3rd Lord Melville; Anne Erskine

George Melville, 1st Earl of Melville (1636 – 20 May 1707) was a Scottish peer and politician who was active during the reign of William III and Mary II. In 1643, he succeeded his father as Lord Melville.

== Career ==
After the Stuart Restoration, Melville was a moderate Whig and Presbyterian who whilst serving under the Duke of Monmouth in his suppression of the Covenanters in 1679 had tried to persuade the insurgents (Whig extremists) to lay down their arms peacefully.

== Exile ==
The turning point in his career came in 1683 when Melville and his son David Leslie-Melville, the Earl of Leven, were accused of complicity in the Rye House Plot. a Whig conspiracy to assassinate King Charles II and his brother the Duke of York (the future James VII). To escape arrest Melville, together with his son, fled to the Netherlands where they joined the band of British Protestant exiles at the court of Prince William of Orange. Here Melville became one of the chief Scots supporters of William of Orange.

== Return ==
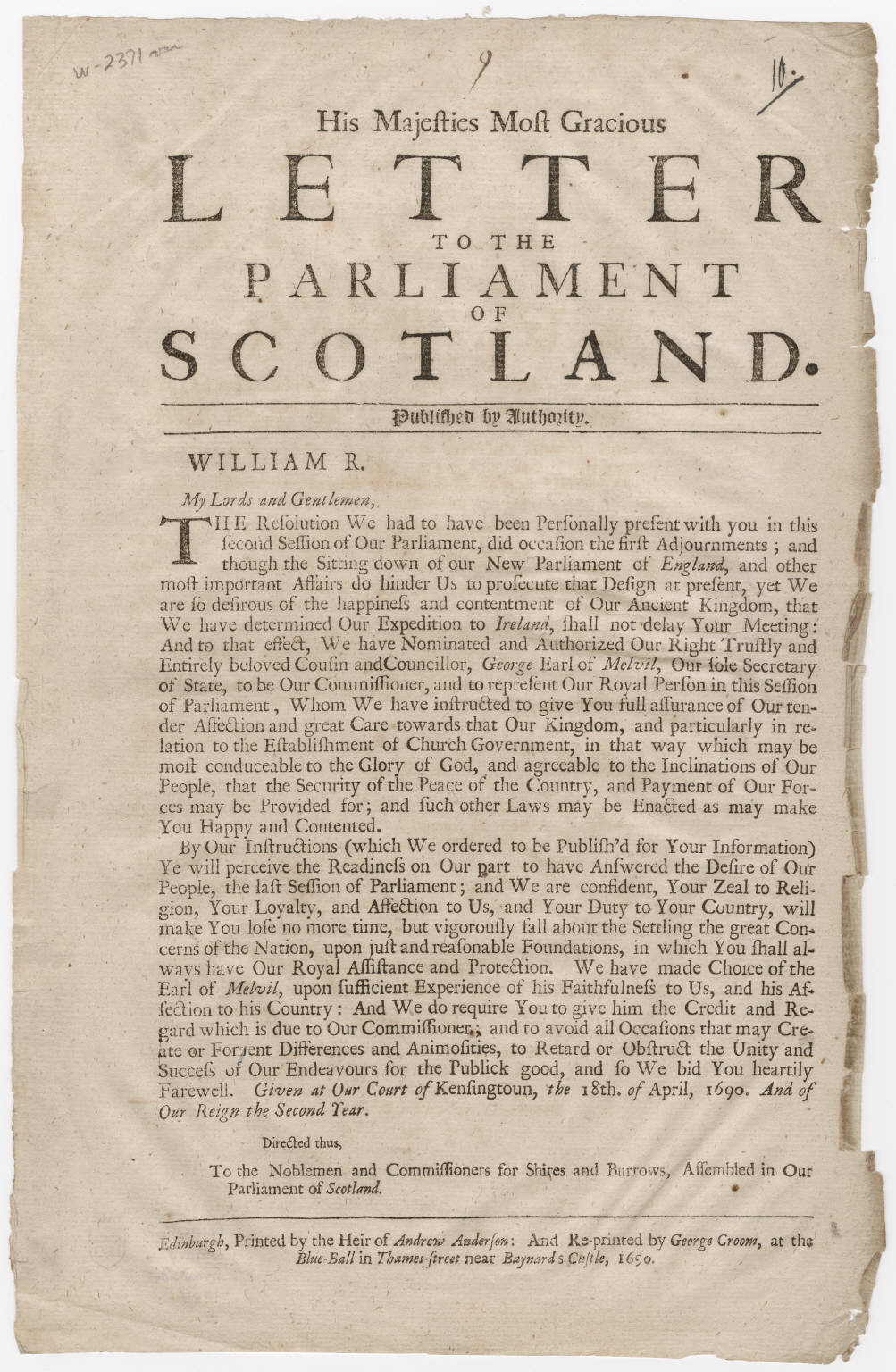
Broadside announcing appointment of George Melville, 1st Earl of Melville as commissioner to Parliament of Scotland, 1690

After the "Glorious Revolution" of 1688 Melville played a prominent part in Scots and English politics, most notably in the Convention Parliament which offered the crown of Scotland to William of Orange and his wife, Mary, daughter of the deposed James VII. In 1689 William made him sole Secretary of State for Scotland and in 1690 he was created Earl of Melville, Viscount Kirkaldie, and Lord Raith, Monymaill and Balwearie (all in the Peerage of Scotland).

Although Melville's appointment as Keeper of the Privy Seal of Scotland in 1693 was a political demotion he enjoyed substantial emoluments, the more so after 1696 when he became President of the Privy Council of Scotland at an annual salary of £1,000 sterling. He was however deprived of his offices when Anne became queen in 1702.

== In fiction ==
It is possible that details of Melville and his son's lives were used by Sir Walter Scott in this novel Old Mortality to lend authentic sounding biographical detail to the hero Henry Morton.

In the novel Morton – like Melville a moderate Whig who desires peace and religious tolerance whilst supporting the Stuart monarchy – is reluctantly involved in the Covenanter uprising of 1679 (albeit on the Rebel side) and attempts to negotiate a peaceful end to the conflict between his brother Calvinists and the Anglican Royalists.

Later Morton is forced to flee to the Netherlands where (living under his mother's name of Melville) he becomes one of William of Orange's supporters, before returning to Britain in the wake of the Glorious Revolution.

Parliament of Scotland
Preceded by The Duke of Hamilton	Lord High Commissioner; 1690	Succeeded by The Duke of Hamilton
Political offices
Preceded by The Lord Carmichael	Keeper of the Privy Seal of Scotland; 1693–1695	Succeeded by The Duke of Queensberry
Peerage of Scotland
New creation	Earl of Melville; 1690–1707	Succeeded by David Melville
Preceded by John Melville	Lord Melville; 1643–1707	Succeeded by David Melville
