= General Council of Scotland =

Parallel institution to the pre-union Parliament of the Kingdom of Scotland

General Council in medieval Scotland was a sister institution to parliament that existed between the late fourteenth century and the early sixteenth century. It has been argued to be almost indistinguishable from parliament, and has always been treated together with parliament by historians. The main difference was that it could be called with less than the statutory 40 days' notice required for parliament and other courts, and, since it was not a court, did not have the final judicial capacity of the senior institution over issues such as forfeiture of life and property for treason. It could and did raise taxation and issued legislation just as important as parliament. In times of royal minority or incapacity, it was often preferred to parliament (for instance the reigns of Robert II, Robert III, the period of captivity of James I (1406 to 1424), and much of the long minority of James II (1437 to 1445). In the reign of James III, it seems to have been largely abandoned, even in the minority period of 1466 to 1470 although this may be partly a side effect of its records being separated from the main register of parliament, and subsequently lost. General councils finally ceased to be held at all in the reign of James IV, shortly before Conventions of Estates began to be held.

== See also ==
- List of parliaments of Scotland (includes General Councils)
