= Parliament of Scotland =

Legislature of the Kingdom of Scotland (1235–1707)

Coordinates: 55°56′57″N 3°11′26″W

Parliament of Scotland Pàrlamaid na h-Alba Pairlament o Scotland
- Royal Arms of Scotland (until 1603)

Type
- Type: Unicameral

History
- Established: c. 1235
- Disbanded: 1 May 1707
- Preceded by: Curia regis
- Succeeded by: Parliament of Great Britain; Scottish Parliament (partially, indirectly)

Leadership
- Lord High Chancellor: The Earl of Seafield^{1} since 1705
- Seats: 227^{1}

Elections
- Voting system: ennoblement by the monarch, inheritance of a peerage, appointment as an officer of state, or election with limited suffrage^{1}

Meeting place
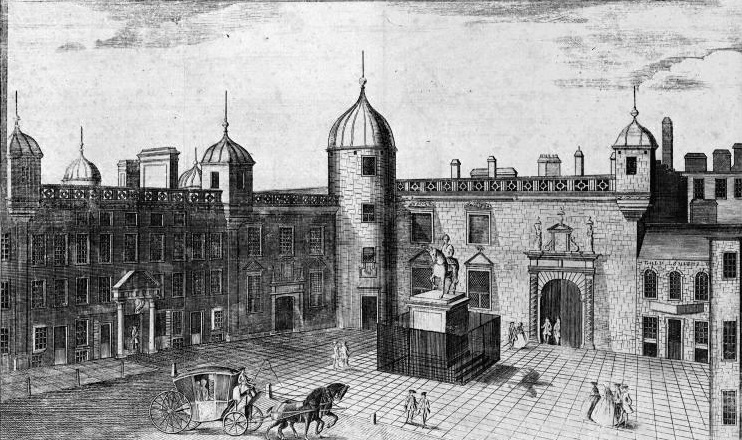
- Parliament House, Edinburgh

Footnotes
- ^{1}Reflecting Parliament as it stood on 25 March 1707; 75 nobles 2 officers of state 83 commissioners for shires 67 commissioners for burghs

The Parliament of Scotland (Scots: Pairlament o Scotland; Scottish Gaelic: Pàrlamaid na h-Alba), also known as the Estates of Scotland, was the legislature of the Kingdom of Scotland from the 13th century until 1707. The parliament evolved during the early 13th century from the king's council of bishops and earls, with the first identifiable parliament being held in 1235 during the reign of Alexander II, when it already possessed a political and judicial role.

A unicameral institution, for most of its existence the Parliament consisted of the three estates of clergy, nobility, and the burghs. By the 1690s it comprised the nobility, the shires, the burghs, and various officers of state. Parliament gave consent for the raising of taxation and played an important role in the administration of justice, foreign policy, war, and the passing of a broad range of legislation. Parliamentary business was also carried out by "sister" institutions, such as General Councils or Conventions of Estates, which could both carry out much business dealt with by parliament, but lacked the powers and ultimate authority of a full parliament.

The Parliament of Scotland was dissolved in 1707 following the ratification of the Treaty of Union between Scotland and England. With the creation of the Kingdom of Great Britain on 1 May 1707, the parliaments of Scotland and England were succeeded by the new Parliament of Great Britain. Under the Acts of Union 1800, the parliaments of Great Britain and Ireland merged to become the Parliament of the United Kingdom.

Long portrayed as a constitutionally defective body that acted merely as a rubber stamp for royal decisions, modern research has found that the Parliament of Scotland played an active role in Scottish affairs. In the 15th and early 16th centuries Parliament was a powerful counter-weight to the power of the Stewart kings. Parliament provided counsel and aid to successive monarchs, while also successfully opposing unpopular royal policies.

== Three Estates ==
The members were collectively referred to as the Three Estates (Scots: Thrie Estaitis), or "three communities of the realm" (tres communitates), until 1690 composed of:

- the first estate of prelates (archbishops, bishops, abbots, and other senior clerics)
- the second estate of the nobility (dukes, marquesses, earls, viscounts, lords of parliament and lay tenants-in-chief)
- the third estate of burgh commissioners (representatives chosen by the royal burghs)

The first estate comprised the archbishops of St Andrews and Glasgow, the bishops of Aberdeen, Argyll, Brechin, Caithness, Dunblane, Dunkeld, Galloway, Isles, Moray, Orkney and Ross and, at different periods, various abbots, priors, archdeacons, and deans. After the reformation in 1559, ecclesiastical representation continued in parliament, with the archbishop of St Andrews and the bishops of Dunblane and Dunkeld providing a Catholic clerical presence until April 1567, alongside the Protestant bishops of Galloway, Orkney and Moray. Thereafter, only Protestant archbishops and bishops were allowed to sit in parliament, alongside those representing abbeys and priories. The clerical estate was abolished between 1639 and 1662, and then again from 1689 when bishops themselves were removed from the Church of Scotland, as a result of the Glorious Revolution and the accession of William II. When no members of the First Estate remained, the Second Estate was then split, to retain the division into three.

From the 16th century, the second estate was reorganised by the selection of Shire Commissioners: this has been argued to have created a fourth estate. During the 17th century, after the Union of the Crowns, a fifth estate of officers of state (see Lord High Commissioner to the Parliament of Scotland) has also been identified. These latter identifications remain highly controversial among parliamentary historians. Regardless, the term used for the assembled members continued to be "the Three Estates".

Burgh and shire commissioners were the closest equivalent of the office of Member of Parliament in the Parliament of England of the time, namely a commoner or member of the lower nobility. Because the Parliament of Scotland was unicameral, all members sat in the same chamber, in contrast to the separate English House of Lords and House of Commons.

== Origins ==
The Scottish Parliament evolved during the Middle Ages from the King's Council. It is perhaps first identifiable as a parliament in 1235, described as a "colloquium" and already with a political and judicial role. In 1296 we have the first mention of burgh representatives taking part in decision making. By the early 14th century, the attendance of knights and freeholders had become important, and Robert the Bruce began regularly calling burgh commissioners to his Parliament. Consisting of The Three Estates – of clerics, lay tenants-in-chief and burgh commissioners – sitting in a single chamber, the Scottish parliament acquired significant powers over particular issues. Most obviously it was needed for consent for taxation (although taxation was only raised irregularly in Scotland in the medieval period), but it also had a strong influence over justice, foreign policy, war, and all manner of other legislation, whether political, ecclesiastical, social or economic. Parliamentary business was also carried out by "sister" institutions, before c. 1500 by General Council and thereafter by the Convention of Estates. These could carry out much business also dealt with by Parliament – taxation, legislation and policy-making – but lacked the ultimate authority of a full parliament. The Scottish parliament met in a number of different locations throughout its history. In addition to Edinburgh, meetings were held in Perth, Stirling, St Andrews, Dundee, Linlithgow, Dunfermline, Inverkeithing, Glasgow, Aberdeen, Inverness and Berwick-upon-Tweed.

== Personnel within Parliament ==
=== Lord Chancellor ===
The Lord Chancellor was the presiding officer of the Parliament of Scotland, as was the case in the English House of Lords. As the Lord Chancellor was also the principal Officer of State, the Keeper of the Great Seal, the presiding officer of the Privy Council, and a judge of the College of Justice, the office never developed into a parliamentary office similar in nature to that of the Speaker of the House of Commons in England. An act of 1428 which created a "common speaker" proved abortive, and the Lord Chancellor remained the presiding officer. Until 1603 the Lord Chancellor presided in the presence of the monarch, and their role was largely procedural, with debate conducted through him. In the absence of the monarch after the Union of the Crowns in 1603, Parliament was presided over by the Lord Chancellor in the presence of the Lord High Commissioner. In 1638 the Covenanters replaced the Lord Chancellor with a President of the Parliament chosen by the members. After the Restoration, the Lord Chancellor was made ex-officio president of the parliament, his functions including the formulation of questions and putting them to the vote.

=== Lords of the Articles ===
From the early 1450s until 1690, a great deal of the legislative business of the Scottish Parliament was usually carried out by a parliamentary committee known as the "Lords of the Articles". This was a committee chosen by the three estates to draft legislation which was then presented to the full assembly to be confirmed. In the past, historians have been particularly critical of this body, claiming that it quickly came to be dominated by royal nominees, thus undermining the power of the full assembly. Recent research suggests that this was far from always being the case. Indeed, in March 1482, the committee was taken over by men shortly to be involved in a coup d'état against the King and his government. On other occasions the committee was so large that it could hardly have been easier to control than the full assembly. More generally, the committee was a pragmatic means to delegate the complicated drafting of acts to those members of parliament skilled in law and letters – not unlike a modern select committee of the UK Parliament – while the right to confirm the act remained with the full assembly of three estates. The Lords of the Articles were abolished in 1690 as part of the revolutionary settlement.

=== The Crown ===
At various points in its history, the Scottish Parliament was able to exert considerable influence over the Crown. This should not be viewed as a slow rise from parliamentary weakness in 1235 to strength in the 17th century, but rather a situation where in particular decades or sessions between the thirteenth and 17th century, parliament became particularly able to influence the Crown, while at other points that ability was more limited. As early as the reign of David II, parliament was able to prevent him pursuing his policy of a union of the crowns with England, while the 15th-century Stewart monarchs were consistently influenced by a prolonged period of parliamentary strength. Reverses to this situation have been argued to have occurred in the late 16th and early 17th centuries under James VI and Charles I, but in the 17th century, even after the Restoration, parliament was able to remove the clergy's right to attend in 1689 and abolish the Lords of the Articles in 1690, thereby limiting royal power. Parliament's strength was such that the Crown turned to corruption and political management to undermine its autonomy in the latter period. Nonetheless, the period from 1690 to 1707 was one in which political "parties" and alliances were formed within parliament in a maturing atmosphere of rigorous debate. The disputes over the English Act of Settlement 1701, the Scottish Act of Security 1704, and the English Alien Act 1705 showed that both sides were prepared to take considered yet considerable risks in their relationships.

== History ==
=== Before 1400 ===
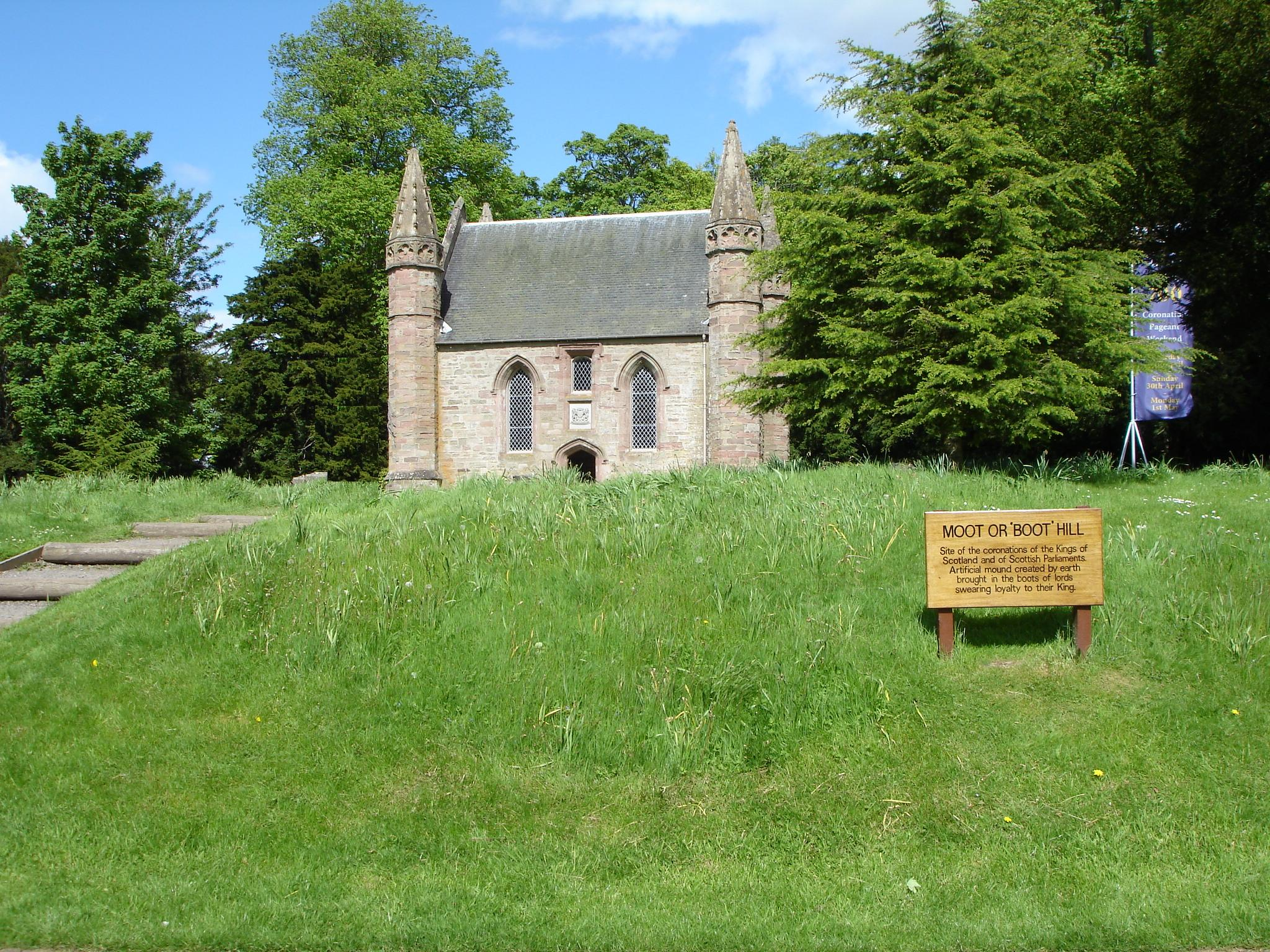
Scone and its Moot hill emerged as a favoured meeting place of the early colloquia and councils in the thirteenth and fourteenth centuries.

Between 1235 and 1286, little can be told with certainty about Parliament's function, but it appears to have had a judicial and political role which was well established by the end of the century. With the death of Alexander III, Scotland found itself without an adult monarch, and in this situation, Parliament seems to have become more prominent as a means to give added legitimacy to the Council of Guardians who ran the country. By the reign of John Balliol (1292–96), Parliament was well established, and Balliol attempted to use it as a means to withstand the encroachments of his overlord, Edward I of England. With his deposition in 1296, Parliament temporarily became less prominent, but it was again held frequently by King Robert Bruce after 1309. During his reign some of the most important documents made by the King and community of the realm were made in Parliament—for instance the 1309–1310 Declaration of the Clergy.

By the reign of David II, the "three estates" (a phrase that replaced "community of the realm" at this time) in Parliament were certainly able to oppose the King when necessary. Most notably, Parliament repeatedly prevented David from accepting an English succession to the throne. During the reigns of Robert II and Robert III, Parliament appears to have been held less often, and royal power in that period also declined, but the institution returned to prominence, and arguably enjoyed its greatest period of power over the Crown after the return of James I from English captivity in 1424.

=== 15th century ===
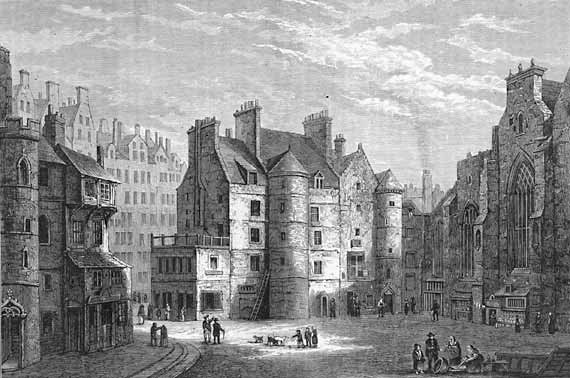
Old Tolbooth, Edinburgh. Usual meeting place of Parliament from 1438 to 1560

By the end of the Middle Ages the Parliament had evolved from the King's Council of Bishops and Earls into a "colloquium" with a political and judicial role. The attendance of knights and freeholders had become important, and burgh commissioners joined them to form the Three Estates. It acquired significant powers over particular issues, including consent for taxation, but it also had a strong influence over justice, foreign policy, war, and other legislation, whether political, ecclesiastical, social or economic. Much of the legislative business of the Scottish parliament was carried out by a parliamentary committee known as the Lords of the Articles, chosen by the three estates to draft legislation which was then presented to the full assembly to be confirmed.

After 1424, Parliament was often willing to defy the King – it was far from being simply a "rubber stamp" of royal decisions. During the 15th century, Parliament was called far more often than, for instance, the English Parliament – on average over once a year – a fact that both reflected and augmented its influence. It repeatedly opposed James I's (1424–1437) requests for taxation to pay an English ransom in the 1420s and was openly hostile to James III (1460–1488) in the 1470s and early 1480s. In 1431, Parliament granted a tax to James I for a campaign in the Highlands on the condition that it be kept in a locked chest under the keepership of figures deeply out of favour with the King. In 1436, there was even an attempt made to arrest the King "in the name of the three estates". Between October 1479 and March 1482, Parliament was conclusively out of the control of James III. It refused to forfeit his brother, the Duke of Albany, despite a royal siege of the Duke's castle, tried to prevent the King leading his army against the English (a powerful indication of the estates' lack of faith in their monarch), and appointed men to the Lords of the Articles and important offices who were shortly to remove the King from power. James IV (1488–1513) realised that Parliament could often create more problems than it solved, and avoided meetings after 1509. This was a trend seen in other European nations as monarchical power grew stronger – for instance England under Henry VII, as well as France and Spain.

=== 16th century ===
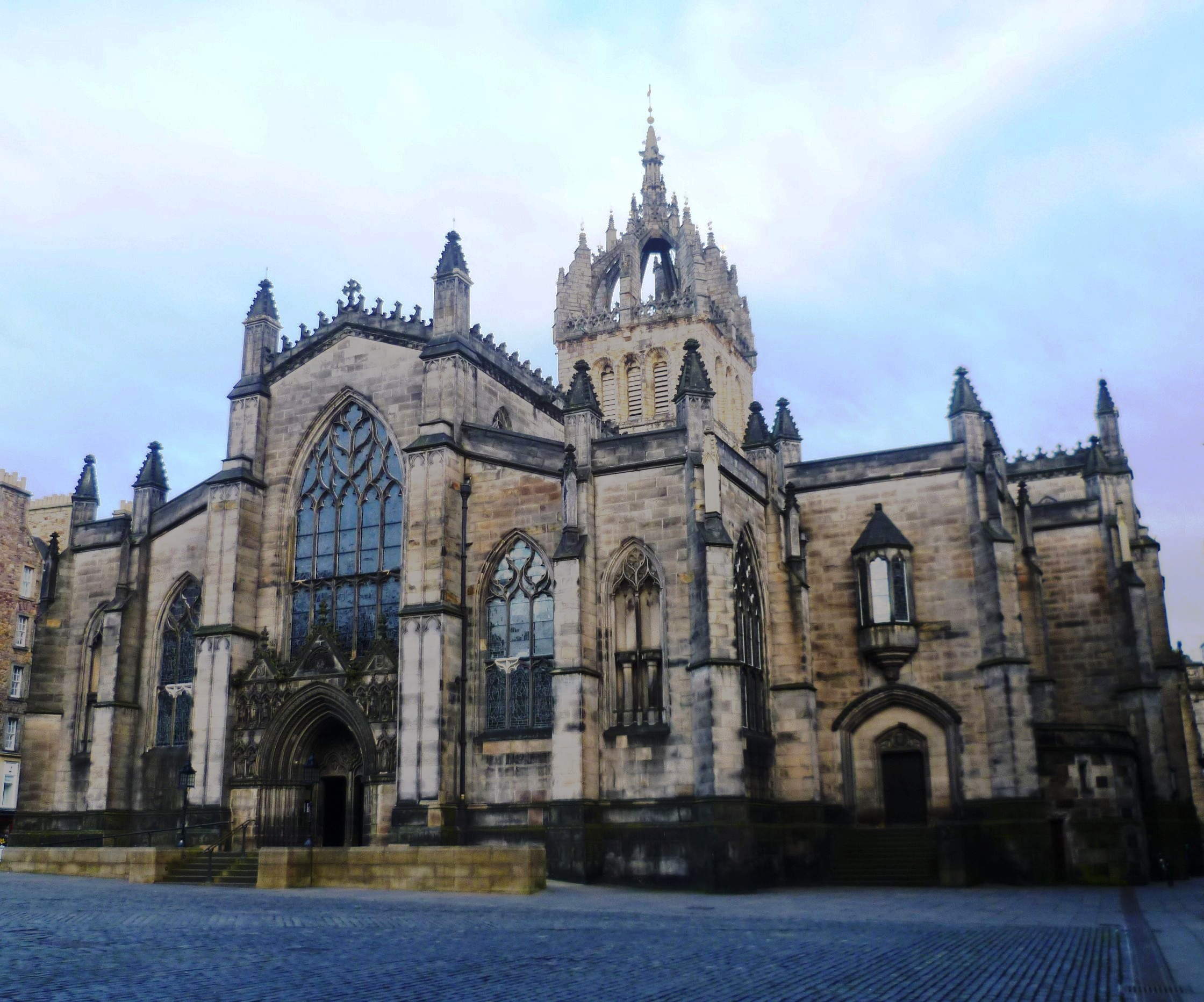
St Giles' Cathedral, common meeting place of Parliament from 1563 to 1639.

Like many continental assemblies, the Scottish Parliament was being called less frequently by the early sixteenth century and might have been dispensed with by the crown had it not been for the series of minorities and regencies that dominated from 1513. The crown was also able to call a Convention of Estates, which was quicker to assemble and could issue laws like parliament, making them invaluable in a crisis, but they could only deal with a specific issue and were more resistant to the giving of taxation rights to the crown.

Parliament played a major part in the Reformation crisis of the mid-sixteenth century. It had been used by James V to uphold Catholic orthodoxy and asserted its right to determine the nature of religion in the country, disregarding royal authority in 1560. The 1560 parliament included 100 lairds, who were predominantly Protestant, and who claimed a right to sit in the Parliament under the provision of a failed shire election act of 1428. Their position in the parliament remained uncertain and their presence fluctuated until the 1428 act was revived in 1587 and provision made for the annual election of two commissioners from each shire (except Kinross and Clackmannan, which had one each). The property qualification for voters was for freeholders who held land from the crown of the value of 40s of auld extent. This excluded the growing class of feuars, who would not gain these rights until 1661. The clerical estate was marginalised in Parliament by the Reformation, with the laymen who had acquired the monasteries sitting as "abbots" and "priors". Catholic clergy were excluded after 1567, but a small number of Protestant bishops continued as the clerical estate. James VI attempted to revive the role of the bishops from about 1600. A further group appeared in the Parliament from the minority of James VI in the 1560s, with members of the Privy Council representing the king's interests, until they were excluded in 1641. James VI continued to manage parliament through the Lords of the Articles, who deliberated legislation before it reached the full parliament. He controlled the committee by filling it with royal officers as non-elected members, but was forced to limit this to eight from 1617.

In the second half of the sixteenth century, Parliament began to legislate on more and more matters and there was a marked increase in the amount of legislation it produced. During the reign of James VI, the Lords of the Articles came more under the influence of the crown. By 1612, they sometimes seem to have been appointed by the Crown rather than Parliament, and as a result the independence of parliament was perceived by contemporaries to have been eroded.

During the 16th century, the composition of Parliament underwent a number of significant changes and it found itself sharing the stage with new national bodies. The emergence of the Convention of Royal Burghs as the "parliament" of Scotland's trading towns and the development of the Kirk's General Assembly after the Reformation (1560) meant that rival representative assemblies could bring pressure to bear on parliament in specific areas.

Following the Reformation, laymen acquired the monasteries and those sitting as "abbots" and "priors" were now, effectively, part of the estate of nobles. The bishops continued to sit in Parliament regardless of whether they conformed to Protestantism or not. This resulted in pressure from the Kirk to reform ecclesiastical representation in Parliament. Catholic clergy were excluded after 1567 but Protestant bishops continued as the clerical estate until their abolition in 1638 when Parliament became an entirely lay assembly. An act of 1587 granted the lairds of each shire the right to send two commissioners to every parliament. These shire commissioners attended from 1592 onwards, although they shared one vote until 1638 when they secured a vote each. The number of burghs with the right to send commissioners to parliament increased quite markedly in the late 16th and early 17th centuries until, in the 1640s, they often constituted the largest single estate in Parliament.

The first printed edition of the legislation of the Parliament, The New Actis and Constitutionis, was published in Edinburgh in 1542 by the printer Thomas Davidson under commission from James V.

=== 17th century ===
Victory the same year in the early stages of the 1639–1652 War of the Three Kingdoms brought the Covenanters to power, with bishops being expelled from both kirk and Parliament. Control of the executive was taken from the Crown, many of the constitutional changes being copied by the English Parliament.

However, the Scots were increasingly concerned at their loss of political and economic power since 1603. In an effort to mitigate this, during the 1642–1645 First English Civil War, the Covenanters agreed the 1643 Solemn League and Covenant. One outcome was the creation of the Committee of Both Kingdoms, a union of English and Scottish parliamentary leaders; opposed by English Royalists and Oliver Cromwell, it was suspended in 1645. In 1647, the Scots agreed to restore Charles to the English throne; their failure in the 1648–1649 Second English Civil War led to his trial and execution by the English Rump Parliament and officers of the New Model Army.

Following the execution the Scots accepted Charles II as king in 1649 but their attempt to put him on the English throne was defeated in the 1649–1651 Anglo-Scots War. As a result, Scotland was incorporated into the Protectorate (see Cromwell's Act of Grace and Tender of Union) and a brief Anglo-Scottish parliamentary union (1653–1659).

An independent Parliament was restored in 1661, sometimes known as the "Drunken Parliament". The term was coined by John Welsh and he was put in trial for it. The restored body passed the 1661 Rescissory Act, which effectively annulled all Parliamentary legislation since 1633. It generally supported Charles and initially did the same when James succeeded in 1685; when it refused to pass his measures, James suspended it and resorted to rule by decree.

The deposition of James in 1689 ended a century of political dispute by confirming the primacy of Parliament over the Crown. The Claim of Right which offered the crown to Mary and her husband William, placed important limitations on royal power, including the abolition of the Lords of the Articles. It has been argued that unlike its English counterpart, the Scottish parliament never became a true centre of national identity. The 1707 Acts of Union created a combined Parliament of Great Britain, which sat in Westminster and largely continued English traditions without interruption.

Robert Burns famously claimed Union was brought about by Scots "bought and sold for English gold" and bribery certainly played a prominent role. However, it was also driven by the same trends the Scots attempted to manage in the 1640s, worsened by the events of the 1690s; this was a time of economic hardship and famine in many parts of Europe, known in Scotland as the Seven ill years. Combined with the failure of the Darién scheme in 1698, it allowed Anne to achieve her great-grandfather's ambition of a unitary state. Parliament was dissolved, 45 Scots being added to the 513 members of the House of Commons and 16 to the 190 members of the House of Lords.

== Chamber layout ==
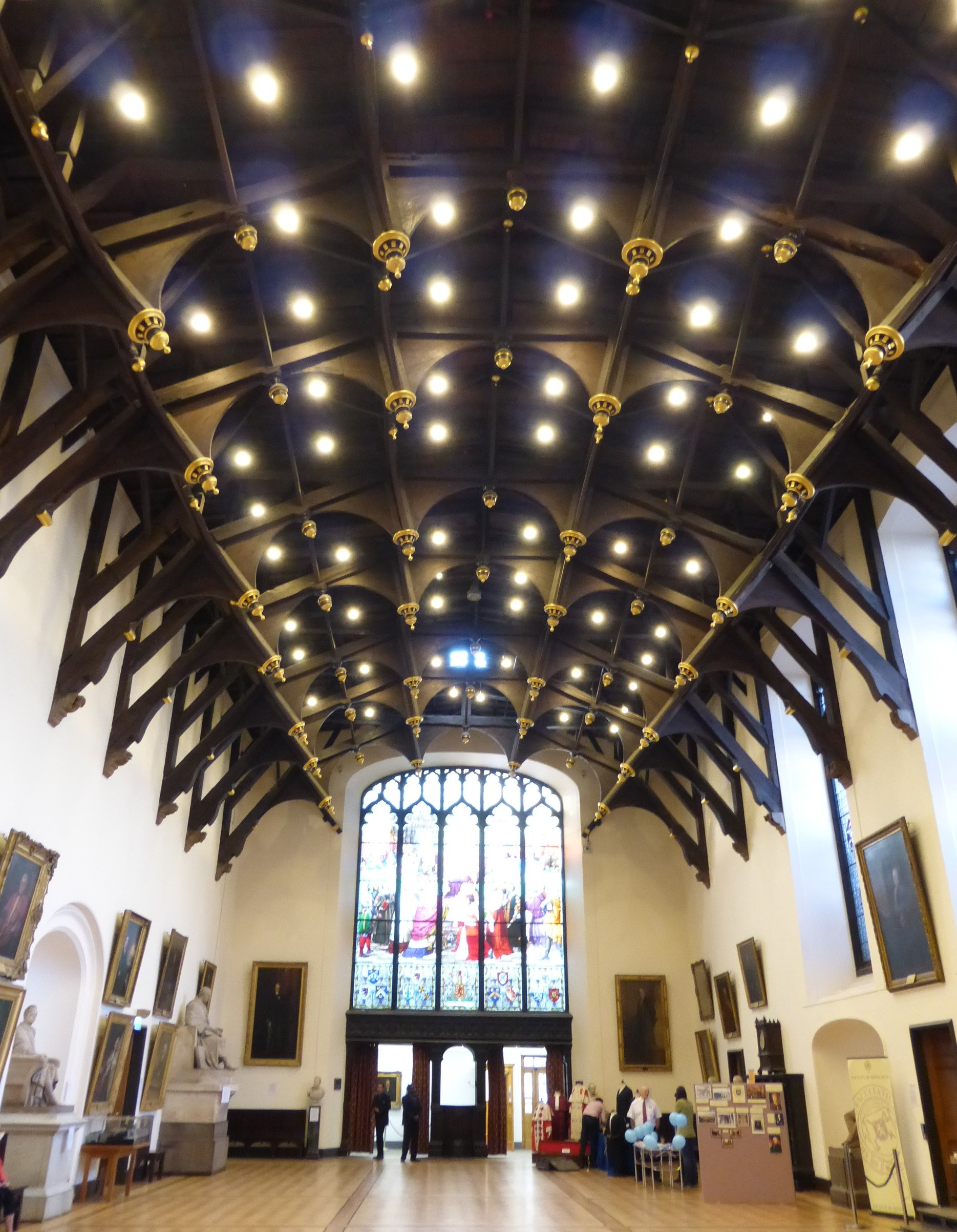
Parliament Hall, the chamber of Parliament from 1639–1707.

The layout of the parliamentary chamber varied over the history of the parliament, due to the venue in which parliament met, the number of estates present and the total number of members in attendance. The arrangements became more settled following the opening of Parliament House in 1639. The chamber was arranged in a square, non-confrontational layout where all the members looked in upon the throne. As parliament was also the highest court in the kingdom, a court bar – the inner bar – was located before the throne for accused to present themselves. There was also an outer bar beyond which only members or invited individuals could pass onto the floor of the chamber. The Lord High Constable was responsible for the outer security of Parliament House, including the doors and the keys to the chamber, and their authority extended to the outer bar before the actual floor of the chamber. The Earl Marischal maintained order within the chamber, and their authority extended from the outer bar to the inner bar, at the foot of the throne. The Constable had a small corps of guards, and the Marischal was attended by four macers who kept order on the floor of the chamber and guarded the Honours.

The monarch or the Lord High Commissioner sat upon the elevated throne at the southern end of Parliament Hall, below which, on chairs, sat the Lord Chancellor (the presiding officer) and the officers of state. On the benches to the right of the throne, at the end closest to the throne, sat the archbishops and bishops until the abolition of the episcopacy in 1689. From then onwards all of the benches to the right of the throne were occupied by the more junior earls and lords of parliament, with the end section of these benches that was farthest from the throne occupied by the non-voting eldest sons and heirs of the nobles, where they could observe business with an eye to their future responsibilities. On the benches to the left of the throne sat the dukes, marquesses, senior earls, viscounts, and senior lords of parliament. On the benches facing the throne sat the burgh commissioners to the right and the shire commissioners to the left. In the middle of the chamber were three tables: on the table nearest the throne were placed the Honours of Scotland (the Crown, sceptre and sword of state), the presence of the Honours signifying crown acceptance of the power of Parliament. The Lord High Constable and the Earl Marischal were seated on either side of this table. At the middle table sat the Lord Advocate, the Secretary of State, and the Lord Clerk Register (the senior clerk of parliament), along with the six clerks of Session and Parliament. At the third table, nearest to the burgh and shire commissioners, sat the senators of the College of Justice who, though unable to vote, could provide legal advice.

== Riding of Parliament ==
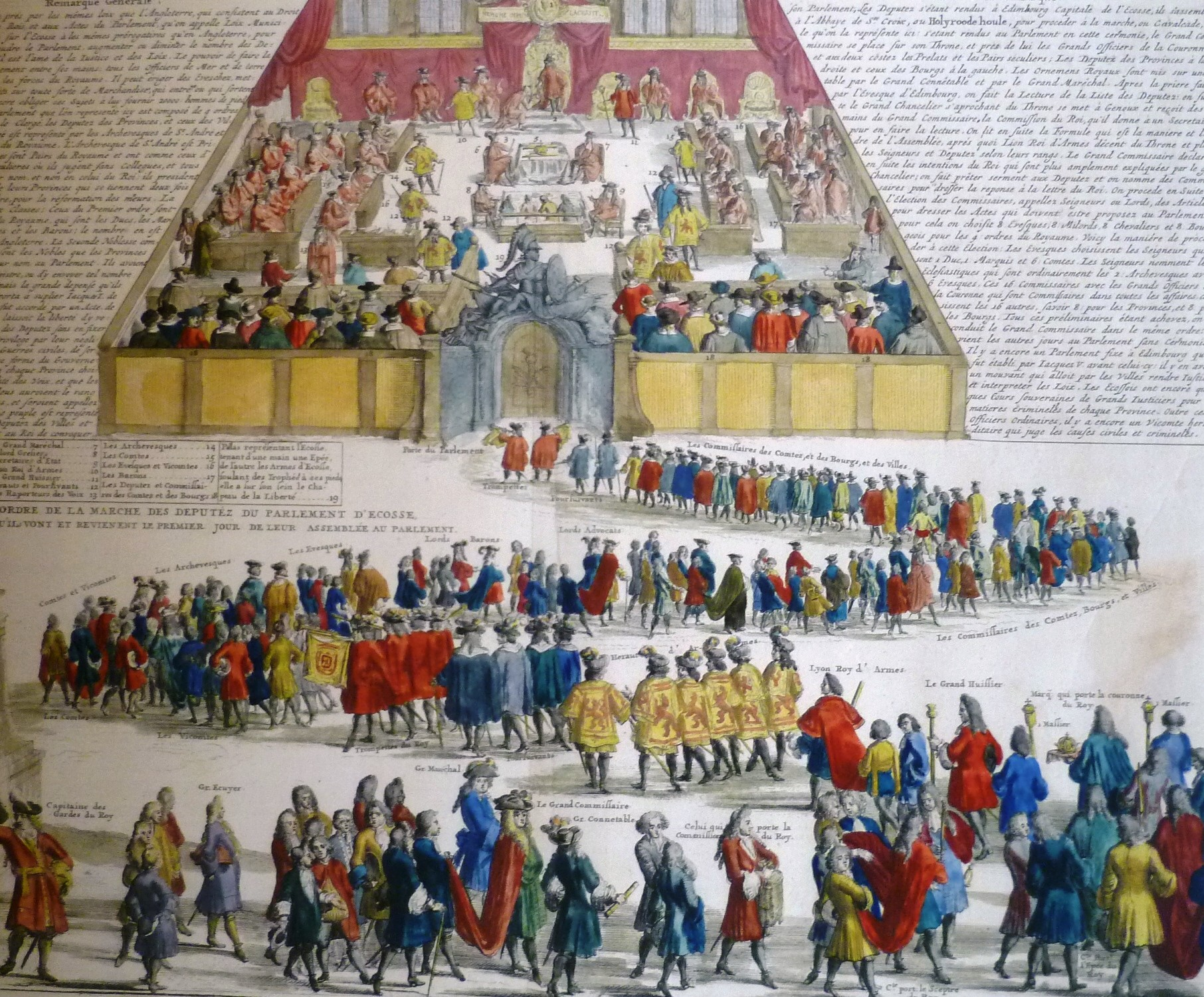
The Riding of Parliament c. 1685, from Nicholas de Gueudeville's Atlas Historique, ou Nouvelle Introduction à l'Histoire à la Chronologie & à la Géographie Ancienne & Moderne (Amsterdam, 1720)

The Riding of Parliament was an elaborate ceremonial event which formally marked the beginning and ending of a term of the Parliament of Scotland. A Riding was not held at the start of each session, but only at the downsitting (beginning) and rising (end) of Parliament. Dating from the 15th century, the ceremony was held wherever Parliament met and involved a largely equestrian procession of the members of the Parliament, the officers of state, the Honours of Scotland, and the monarch (or the Lord High Commissioner) from the royal palace or castle to the Parliament's place of assembly. From the beginning of the 16th century, the Riding of Parliament was usually held in Edinburgh, with the procession travelling along the Royal Mile from the Palace of Holyroodhouse to the Parliament House. The final Riding of Parliament was held on 6 May 1703, following the election of 1702.

When Mary, Queen of Scots, rode into Parliament on 26 May 1563, John Knox described the occasion as a "stinking pride of women". The English diplomat Thomas Randolph was more appreciative, writing they were "about 30 of the chosen and picked ladies that are in this realm" including "noblemen's wives as they were in dignity, 12 in number, after them the four virgins, maids, Maries, damoiselles of honor, or the Queen's mignons ... a fairer sight was never seen". The 16 women were followed by "many more so wonderful in beauty that I know not what court may be compared unto them". Mary herself wore "her robes upon her back, and a rich crown on her head".

The final form of the Riding was determined by the Parliament in May 1703. The Riding began with the transportation of the Honours of Scotland from Edinburgh Castle to the Palace of Holyroodhouse. The members of the Parliament, their servants and horses, the Lord Clerk Register, the Lord Lyon King of Arms, and the heralds, pursuivants, and trumpeters, gathered on the forecourt of the Palace to wait upon the Lord High Commissioner. The nobles were all dressed in scarlet robes. Any member of the Parliament who failed to attend the Riding without a good reason for their absence were fined or even lost their voting rights in Parliament. Security was assured by the guards of the Lord High Constable and the Earl Marischal, who were lined up from the door of Parliament House to the Royal Mile. Citizens of Edinburgh, with arms, lined both sides of the Royal Mile from Parliament Square to the Netherbow Port, and the foot guards lined both sides from the Netherbow Port to the Palace. Having carried out a thorough inspection of the Parliament House, the Lord High Constable, wearing his robes, was seated next to his guards on a chair at the Lady Steps of St Giles' Cathedral, from which he would rise and salute the members of the Parliament as they arrived in Parliament Square. The Earl Marischal, also wearing his robes and seated at the head of his guards at the door of Parliament House, received the members as they entered Parliament House.

Half an hour before the Riding began, the Lord High Chancellor (the presiding officer of the Parliament), along with the other officers of state who were noblemen, would ride up from the Palace to Parliament House, with the Lord High Chancellor having his purse and mace carried before him, and the Lord President of the Privy Council and the Lord Keeper of the Privy Seal riding either side of him. When the Lord High Commissioner was ready, the Riding would begin, with the Lord Clerk Register holding the roll of Parliament and the Lord Lyon King of Arms calling the names of each member in the order in which they were to ride. The procession was headed by soldiers of the Troop of Life Guard, followed by two trumpeters and two pursuivants. Parliament then proceeded in an agreed order by estate, with the most senior riding last – burgh commissioners, shire commissioners, lords of parliament, viscounts, earls, marquesses, and dukes. The members rode up the Royal Mile two by two, with each member attended by a certain number of servants (one for every burgh commissioner, two for shire commissioners, three for every lord and viscount, four for every earl, six with every marquess, and eight for each duke). Each noble also had a trainbearer, and the noble's servants wore over their liveries velvet coats with the noble's coat of arms and motto embroidered on them.

The earls were followed by four trumpeters, four pursuivants, six heralds and the Lord Lyon King of Arms. Following them were the Honours of Scotland, accompanied by the macers of the Parliament and the Privy Council, with the Sword of State borne by the Earl of Mar, the Sceptre borne by the Earl of Crawford, and the Crown borne by the Earl of Forfar, on behalf of the Duke of Douglas, the hereditary bearer of the Crown. Then came the Lord High Commissioner, attended by his servants, pages, and footmen, and preceded by the Earl of Morton bearing the purse containing the commission from Queen Anne appointing the Lord High Commissioner. The Commissioner was followed by the dukes and marquesses, with the Marquess of Lorne, as colonel of the Life Guard, riding at the rear of the procession. The Lord High Commissioner was received at the door of Parliament House by the Lord High Constable and the Earl Marischal, both of whom led the Commissioner to the throne, followed by the Gentleman Usher of the White Rod, while, amid the blowing of trumpets, the Honours of Scotland were laid on the table in the centre of Parliament Hall.

== Locations ==
Other than Edinburgh, Parliament was also held at the following locations:

- Perth, various
- Stirling, various
- St Andrews, various
- Scone Abbey, various
- Berwick-upon-Tweed, various
- Linlithgow Palace (1399, 1404, 1545, 1585, 1593 and 1596)
- Dundee (1341, 1347, 1350, 1359 and 1597)
- Aberdeen (1302, 1342 and 1362)
- Dunfermline (1296 and 1596)
- Roxburgh, 1255
- Birgham, 1290
- Lanark, 1294
- Ayr, 1315
- Inverkeithing, 1354
- Glasgow, 1384
- Inverness, 1428
- Haddington, 1548
- Falkland Palace, 1599

== See also ==
- List of parliaments of Scotland
- A Satire of the Three Estates, by David Lyndsay
- Commissioner (Scottish Parliament)
- Convention of the Estates of Scotland
- General Council of Scotland
- List of acts of the Parliament of Scotland
- List of constituencies in the Parliament of Scotland at the time of the Union
- Parliament of England
- Parliament of Great Britain
- Parliament of Ireland
- Records of the Parliaments of Scotland
- Scottish Parliament

Scottish Parliament
Preceded by Curia regis	Parliament of Scotland c. 1235–1707	Succeeded by Parliament of Great Britain; 1707–1800; Scottish Parliament; 1999–present
