= List of knights and ladies of the Thistle =

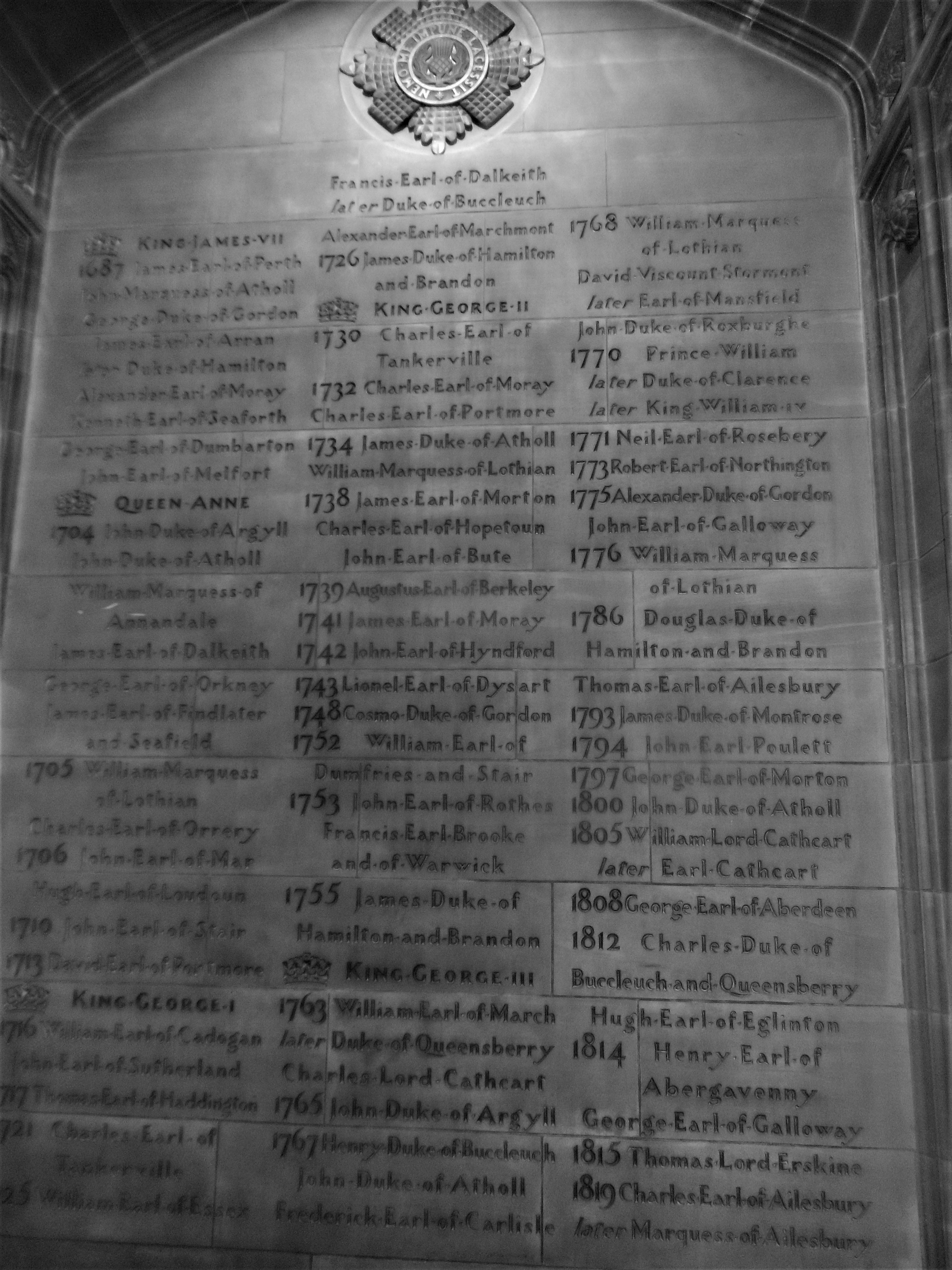
List of Knights of the Thistle, St Giles' Cathedral

The Most Ancient and Most Noble Order of the Thistle was founded in 1687. Dates shown are for election or installation. Probably incomplete.

Seventeenth century · Anne · George I · George II · George III · George IV · William IV · Victoria · Edward VII · George V · Edward VIII · George VI · Elizabeth II · Charles III
See also · References

== Seventeenth century ==
Seventeenth century
N°	Name	Image	Arms	Life	Date	Notes
S1	King James VII			1633–1701	1687	Sovereign of the order upon establishing it.
1	James Drummond, 4th Earl of Perth			1648–1716	1687	Founder knight
2	George Gordon, 1st Duke of Gordon			1649–1716	1687	Founder knight
3	John Murray, 1st Marquess of Atholl			1631–1703	1687	Founder knight
4	James Hamilton, 4th Duke of Hamilton			1658–1712	1687	Founder knight
5	Kenneth Mackenzie, 4th Earl of Seaforth			1661–1701	1687	Founder knight
6	John Drummond, 1st Earl of Melfort			1650–1715	1687	Founder knight
7	George Douglas, 1st Earl of Dumbarton			1635–1692	1687	Founder knight
8	Alexander Stuart, 5th Earl of Moray			1634–1701	1687	Founder knight
S2	Queen Mary II			1662–1694	1688	Nominally sovereign upon accession.
S3	King William II			1650–1702	1688	Nominally sovereign upon accession.

== Anne ==
Anne (1702–1714)
N°	Name	Image	Arms	Life	Date	Notes
S4	Queen Anne			1665–1714	1702	Became sovereign of the order upon accession to the throne.
9	John Campbell, 2nd Duke of Argyll			1680–1743	1704	Resigned 1710 when made KG
10	John Murray, 1st Duke of Atholl			1659–1724	1704	
11	William Johnstone, 1st Marquess of Annandale			d. 1721	1704	
12	James Scott, Earl of Dalkeith			1674–1705	1704	
13	George Douglas-Hamilton, 1st Earl of Orkney			1666–1737	1704	
14	James Ogilvy, 1st Earl of Seafield			1663–1730	1704	
15	William Kerr, 2nd Marquess of Lothian			1661–1722	1704	
16	Charles Boyle, 4th Earl of Orrery			1674–1731	1704	
17	John Erskine, Earl of Mar			1675–1732	1706	Degraded in 1715
18	Hugh Campbell, 3rd Earl of Loudoun			d. 1731	1706	
19	John Dalrymple, 2nd Earl of Stair			1673–1747	1710	
20	David Colyear, 1st Earl of Portmore			1656–1730	1713	

== George I ==
George I (1714–1727)
N°	Name	Image	Arms	Life	Date	Notes
S5	King George I			1660–1727	1714	Became sovereign of the order upon accession to the throne.
21	John Gordon, 16th Earl of Sutherland			1661–1733	1716	
22	William Cadogan, 1st Baron Cadogan			1670–1726	1716	Later Earl Cadogan
23	Thomas Hamilton, 6th Earl of Haddington			1680–1735	1717	
24	Charles Bennet, 1st Earl of Tankerville			1674–1722	1721	
25	Francis Scott, Earl of Dalkeith			1695–1751	1725	Later 2nd Duke of Buccleuch
26	William Capell, 3rd Earl of Essex			1697–1743	1725	Resigned 1738 when made KG
27	Alexander Hume-Campbell, 2nd Earl of Marchmont			1676–1740	1725	
28	James Hamilton, 5th Duke of Hamilton			1703–1743	1726	

== George II ==
George II (1727–1760)
N°	Name	Image	Arms	Life	Date	Notes
S6	King George II			1683–1760	1727	Became sovereign of the order upon accession to the throne.
29	Charles Bennet, 2nd Earl of Tankerville			1697–1753	1730	
30	Charles Stuart, 6th Earl of Moray			1660–1735	1731	
31	Charles Colyear, 2nd Earl of Portmore			1700–1785	1732	
32	James Murray, 2nd Duke of Atholl			1690–1764	1734	Keeper of the Privy Seal of Scotland
33	William Kerr, 3rd Marquess of Lothian			1690–1767	1734	Lord High Commissioner to the General Assembly of the Church of Scotland
34	James Douglas, 14th Earl of Morton			1703–1768	1738	
35	John Stuart, 3rd Earl of Bute			1713–1792	1738	Resigned 1762 when made KG
36	Charles Hope, 1st Earl of Hopetoun			1681–1742	1738	
37	Augustus Berkeley, 4th Earl of Berkeley			1716–1755	1739	Lord Lieutenant and Vice-Admiral of Gloucestershire
38	James Stuart, 8th Earl of Moray			1708–1767	1741	
39	John Carmichael, 3rd Earl of Hyndford			1701–1767	1742	Envoy Extraordinary to Prussia
40	Lionel Tollemache, 4th Earl of Dysart			1707–1770	1743	
41	Cosmo Gordon, 3rd Duke of Gordon			1720–1752	1748	
42	William Dalrymple-Crichton, 5th Earl of Dumfries, 4th Earl of Stair			1699–1768	1752	
43	Francis Greville, 1st Earl Brooke			1719–1773	1753	Lord Lieutenant of Warwickshire
44	John Leslie, 10th Earl of Rothes			1698–1767	1753	Governor of Duncannon
45	James Douglas-Hamilton, 6th Duke of Hamilton			1724–1758	1755	

== George III ==
George III (1760–1820)
N°	Name	Image	Arms	Life	Date	Notes
S7	King George III			1738–1820	1760	Became sovereign of the order upon accession to the throne.
46	Charles Cathcart, 9th Lord Cathcart			1721–1776	1763	
47	William Douglas, 3rd Earl of March			1725–1810	1763	Later 5th Duke of Queensberry
48	John Campbell, 4th Duke of Argyll			1693–1770	1765	Colonel of the 2nd (Royal North British); Regiment of Dragoons
49	Henry Scott, 3rd Duke of Buccleuch			1746–1812	1767	Resigned 1794 when made KG
50	John Murray, 3rd Duke of Atholl			1729–1774	1767	Former Lord of Mann
51	Frederick Howard, 5th Earl of Carlisle			1748–1825	1767	Resigned 1793, made KG
52	William Kerr, 4th Marquess of Lothian			1710–1775	1768	Colonel of the 11th Regiment of Dragoons
53	David Murray, 7th Viscount Stormont			1727–1796	1768	Later 2nd Earl of Mansfield
54	John Ker, 3rd Duke of Roxburghe			1740–1804	1768	Lord of the Bedchamber
55	The Prince William Henry			1765–1837	1770	Later Duke of Clarence and St Andrews; later King William IV
56	Neil Primrose, 3rd Earl of Rosebery			1729–1814	1771	
57	Robert Henley, 2nd Earl of Northington			1747–1786	1773	Teller of the Exchequer
58	Alexander Gordon, 4th Duke of Gordon			1743–1827	1775	
59	John Stewart, 7th Earl of Galloway			1736–1806	1775	
60	William Kerr, 5th Marquess of Lothian			1737–1815	1776	
61	Douglas Hamilton, 8th Duke of Hamilton			1756–1799	1786	
62	Thomas Brudenell-Bruce, 1st Earl of Ailesbury			1739–1814	1786	Lord Chamberlain to Queen Charlotte
63	James Graham, 3rd Duke of Montrose			1755–1836	1793	Resigned 1812 when made KG
64	John Poulett, 4th Earl Poulett			1756–1819	1794	Lord Lieutenant of Somerset
65	George Douglas, 16th Earl of Morton			1761–1827	1797	Lord Chamberlain to Queen Charlotte
66	John Murray, 4th Duke of Atholl			1755–1830	1800	Grand Master of the Antient Grand Lodge of England
67	William Cathcart, 10th Lord Cathcart			1755–1843	1805	Later Earl Cathcart
68	George Hamilton-Gordon, 4th Earl of Aberdeen			1784–1860	1808	Prime Minister 1852–1855
69	Charles Montagu-Scott, 4th Duke of Buccleuch			1772–1819	1812	Appointed by the Prince Regent
70	Hugh Montgomerie, 12th Earl of Eglinton			1739–1819	1812	Appointed by the Prince Regent
71	George Stewart, 8th Earl of Galloway			1768–1834	1814	Appointed by the Prince Regent
72	Henry Nevill, 2nd Earl of Abergavenny			1755–1843	1814	Appointed by the Prince Regent
73	Thomas Erskine, 1st Baron Erskine			1750–1823	1815	Appointed by the Prince Regent
74	Charles Brudenell-Bruce, 2nd Earl of Ailesbury			1773–1856	1819	Appointed by the Prince Regent. Later Marquess of Ailesbury.

== George IV ==
George IV (1820–1830)
N°	Name	Image	Arms	Life	Date	Notes
S8	King George IV			1762–1830	1820	Became sovereign of the order upon accession to the throne.
75	William Kerr, 6th Marquess of Lothian			1763–1824	1820	Lord Lieutenant of Roxburghshire and Midlothian
76	George Hay, 8th Marquess of Tweeddale			1787–1876	1820	Pro-Grand Master of the Grand Lodge of Scotland
77	Archibald Kennedy, 12th Earl of Cassilis			1770–1846	1821	Later Marquess of Ailsa
78	James Maitland, 8th Earl of Lauderdale			1759–1839	1821	Former Keeper of the Great Seal of Scotland
79	Robert Dundas, 2nd Viscount Melville			1771–1851	1821	First Lord of the Admiralty
80	Charles Douglas, 6th Marquess of Queensberry			1777–1837	1821	Lord Lieutenant of Dumfries
81	George Gordon, 5th Earl of Aboyne			1761–1853	1827	Later 9th Marquess of Huntly
82	Henry Greville, 3rd Earl of Warwick			1779–1853	1827	Lord-Lieutenant of Warwickshire
83	James Duff, 4th Earl Fife			1776–1857	1827	Lord Lieutenant of Banffshire
84	Francis Stuart, 10th Earl of Moray			1771–1848	1827	Lord Lieutenant of Elginshire
85	The Prince Augustus Frederick, Duke of Sussex			1773–1843	1830	Son of George III
86	Walter Montagu Douglas Scott, 5th Duke of Buccleuch			1806–1884	1830	Resigned 1835 when made KG

== William IV ==
William IV (1830–1837)
N°	Name	Image	Arms	Life	Date	Notes
87	William Hay, 18th Earl of Erroll			1801–1846	1834	Master of the Horse to Queen Adelaide
88	David Murray, 3rd Earl of Mansfield			1777–1840	1835	Lord Lieutenant of Clackmannanshire

== Victoria ==
Victoria (1837-1901)
N°	Name	Image	Arms	Life	Date	Notes
S10	Queen Victoria			1819–1901	1837	Became sovereign of the order upon accession to the throne.
89	John Campbell, 2nd Marquess of Breadalbane			1796–1862	1838	Former Grand Master of the Grand Lodge of Scotland
90	James Innes-Ker, 6th Duke of Roxburghe			1816–1879	1840	
91	Archibald Primrose, 4th Earl of Rosebery			1783–1868	1840	
E1	Prince Albert of Saxe-Coburg and Gotha			1819–1861	1842	Consort of Queen Victoria
92	William Murray, 4th Earl of Mansfield and Mansfield			1806–1898	1843	
93	John Crichton-Stuart, 2nd Marquess of Bute			1793–1848	1843	Lord Lieutenant of Buteshire and Glamorgan
94	James Graham, 4th Duke of Montrose			1799–1874	1845	Lord Lieutenant of Stirlingshire and former Vice-Chamberlain of the Household.
95	John Dalrymple, 8th Earl of Stair			1771–1853	1847	Former Colonel of the 92nd Regiment of Foot
96	James Bruce, 8th Earl of Elgin			1811–1863	1847	Viceroy of India
97	James Andrew Broun-Ramsay, 10th Earl of Dalhousie			1812–1860	1848	Later Marquess of Dalhousie; Viceroy of India
98	Robert Dundas Haldane-Duncan, 1st Earl of Camperdown			1785–1859	1848	
99	Alexander Fraser, 17th Lord Saltoun			1785–1853	1852	Colonel of the 2nd (The Queen's Royal); Regiment of Foot
100	Archibald Montgomerie, 13th Earl of Eglinton			1780–1858	1853	Lord Lieutenant of Ayrshire and former Lord Lieutenant of Ireland.
101	Thomas Hamilton, 9th Earl of Haddington			1780–1858	1853	Former First Lord of the Admiralty
102	Fox Maule Ramsay, 1st Baron Panmure			1801–1874	1853	Later 11th Earl of Dalhousie
103	George Murray, 6th Duke of Atholl			1814–1864	1853	Grand Master of the Grand Lodge of Scotland
104	George Campbell, 8th Duke of Argyll			1823–1900	1856	Postmaster General
105	George Kinnaird, 9th Lord Kinnaird			1807–1878	1857	Former Master of the Buckhounds
106	Archibald Kennedy, 2nd Marquess of Ailsa			1816–1870	1859	
107	James Duff, 5th Earl Fife			1814–1879	1860	Lord Lieutenant of Banffshire
108	Thomas Dundas, 2nd Earl of Zetland			1795–1873	1861	Resigned 1872 when made KG
109	Robert Hamilton, 8th Lord Belhaven and Stenton			1793–1868	1861	
110	David Ogilvy, 10th Earl of Airlie			1826–1881	1862	
111	Francis Napier, 10th Lord Napier			1819–1898	1864	Ambassador to Prussia
E2	The Prince Alfred Ernest Albert			1844–1900	1864	Later Duke of Edinburgh and Duke of Saxe-Coburg and Gotha.
112	Thomas Fraser, 12th Lord Lovat			1802–1875	1865	Lord Lieutenant of Inverness
113	John Dalrymple, 10th Earl of Stair			1819–1903	1865	Lord Lieutenant of Wigtown
E3	The Prince Albert Edward, Duke of Rothesay			1841–1910	1867	Son of Queen Victoria, later King Edward VII
114	John Stewart-Murray, 7th Duke of Atholl			1840–1917	1868	
115	James Carnegie, 9th Earl of Southesk			1827–1905	1869	Former Lord Lieutenant of Kincardineshire
E4	The Prince Arthur William Patrick Albert			1850–1942	1869	Son of Queen Victoria, later Duke of Connaught and Strathearn.
116	William Elliot-Murray-Kynynmound, 3rd Earl of Minto			1814–1891	1870	
117	John Campbell, Marquess of Lorne			1845–1914	1871	Later 9th Duke of Argyll
E5	The Prince Leopold George Duncan Albert			1853–1884	1871	Son of Queen Victoria, later Duke of Albany
118	Charles Colville, 10th Lord Colville of Culross			1818–1903	1874	Later Viscount Colville of Culross
119	John Crichton-Stuart, 3rd Marquess of Bute			1847–1900	1875	
120	William Montagu Douglas Scott, Earl of Dalkeith			1831–1914	1875	Later 6th Duke of Buccleuch
121	Sir William Stirling-Maxwell, 9th Baronet			1818–1878	1876	Chancellor of the University of Glasgow
122	William Douglas-Hamilton, 12th Duke of Hamilton			1845–1895	1878	
123	Schomberg Kerr, 9th Marquess of Lothian			1833–1900	1878	Keeper of the Privy Seal of Scotland
124	John Ogilvy-Grant, 7th Earl of Seafield			1815–1881	1879	
125	Douglas Graham, 5th Duke of Montrose			1852–1925	1879	
126	Alexander Duff, 6th Earl Fife			1849–1912	1881	Later Duke of Fife and son-in-law of Queen Victoria.
127	John Ramsay, 13th Earl of Dalhousie			1847–1887	1881	
E6	Prince George, Duke of Cambridge			1819–1904	1881	Agnatic first cousin of Queen Victoria
128	Alan Stewart, 10th Earl of Galloway			1835–1901	1888	
129	James Lindsay, 26th Earl of Crawford			1847–1913	1891	Former President of the Lancashire and Cheshire Antiquarian Society.
E7	Prince George, Duke of York			1865–1936	1893	Grandson of Queen Victoria, later King George V
130	Archibald Primrose, 5th Earl of Rosebery			1847–1929	1895	Prime Minister 1894–1895
131	William Hay, 10th Marquess of Tweeddale			1826–1911	1898	
132	Charles Douglas-Home, 12th Earl of Home			1834–1918	1899	Lord Lieutenant of Lanarkshire
133	Lawrence Dundas, 1st Marquess of Zetland			1844–1929	1900	Former Lord Lieutenant of Ireland
134	John Hope, 7th Earl of Hopetoun			1860–1908	1900	Later Marquess of Linlithgow

== Edward VII ==
Edward VII (1901–1910)
N°	Name	Image	Arms	Life	Date	Notes
135	Alexander Bruce, 6th Lord Balfour of Burleigh			1849–1921	1901	Secretary for Scotland
136	Charles Hay, 20th Earl of Erroll			1852–1927	1901	
137	Henry Innes-Ker, 8th Duke of Roxburghe			1876–1932	1902	
138	George Baillie-Hamilton-Arden, 11th Earl of Haddington			1827–1917	1902	Lord Lieutenant of East Lothian
139	Ronald Leslie-Melville, 11th Earl of Leven			1835–1906	1905	Keeper of the Privy Seal of Scotland
140	John Hamilton-Gordon, 7th Earl of Aberdeen			1847–1934	1906	Later Marquess of Aberdeen and Temair
141	Edward Marjoribanks, 2nd Baron Tweedmouth			1849–1909	1908	Lord President of the Council
142	Gavin Hamilton, 2nd Baron Hamilton of Dalzell			1872–1952	1909	

== George V ==
George V (1910–1936)
N°	Name	Image	Arms	Life	Date	Notes
143	Walter Erskine, 12th Earl of Mar			1865–1955	1911	Lord Lieutenant of Clackmannanshire
144	Donald Mackay, 11th Lord Reay			1839–1921	1911	Lord Lieutenant of Roxburghshire and former Governor of Bombay.
145	Richard Haldane, 1st Viscount Haldane			1856–1928	1913	Lord High Chancellor
E8	Prince Arthur Frederick Patrick Albert of Connaught			1883–1938	1913	Governor-General of South Africa, husband of the 2nd Duchess of Fife.
146	Arthur Kinnaird, 11th Lord Kinnaird			1847–1923	1914	
147	Simon Fraser, 14th Lord Lovat			1871–1933	1915	
148	John Montagu Douglas Scott, 7th Duke of Buccleuch			1864–1935	1917	Lord Lieutenant of Dumfries
149	Douglas Haig			1861–1928	1917	Later Earl Haig
150	John Stewart-Murray, 8th Duke of Atholl			1871–1942	1918	Lord Lieutenant of Perthshire
151	David Lindsay, 27th Earl of Crawford			1871–1940	1921	First Commissioner of Works
E9	The Prince Edward, Duke of Rothesay			1894–1972	1922	Son of King George V, later King Edward VIII
152	John Crichton-Stuart, 4th Marquess of Bute			1881–1947	1922	Former Lord Lieutenant of Buteshire
E10	The Prince Albert, Duke of York			1895–1952	1923	Son of King George V, later King George VI
153	Algernon Keith-Falconer, 9th Earl of Kintore			1852–1930	1923	Former Governor of South Australia
154	Ronald Munro Ferguson, 1st Viscount Novar			1860–1934	1926	Former Governor-General of Australia
155	Sidney Buller-Fullerton-Elphinstone, 16th Lord Elphinstone			1869–1955	1927	Former Lord High Commissioner to the General Assembly of the Church of Scotland.
156	Victor Hope, 2nd Marquess of Linlithgow			1887–1952	1928	Viceroy of India
157	Claude Bowes-Lyon, 14th Earl of Strathmore and Kinghorne			1855–1944	1928	Lord Lieutenant of Angus
158	George Sutherland-Leveson-Gower, 5th Duke of Sutherland			1888–1963	1929	Lord Lieutenant of Sutherland
159	Sir John Stirling-Maxwell, 10th Baronet			1866–1956	1929	
160	Charles Douglas-Home, 13th Earl of Home			1873–1951	1930	Lord Lieutenant of Berwickshire
161	Sir Herbert Maxwell, 7th Baronet			1845–1937	1933	Lord Lieutenant of Wigtown
E11	The Prince Henry, Duke of Gloucester			1900–1974	1933	Son of King George V
162	Edward Bruce, 10th Earl of Elgin			1881–1968	1933	Former Grand Master of the Grand Lodge of Scotland.
163	Archibald Leslie-Melville, 13th Earl of Leven			1890–1947	1934	
164	Donald Cameron, 25th Lochiel			1876–1951	1934	
E12	The Prince George, Duke of Kent			1902–1942	1935	Son of King George V

== Edward VIII ==
Edward VIII (1936)
N°	Name	Image	Arms	Life	Date	Notes
	Edward VIII did not make any appointments to the Order during his brief reign.					

== George VI ==
George VI (1936–1952)
N°	Name	Image	Arms	Life	Date	Notes
S30	King George VI			1895–1952	1937	Became sovereign of the order upon accession to the throne. Previously an extra knight of the order.
E13	Queen Elizabeth			1900–2002	1937	Consort of King George VI; Later Queen Elizabeth, the Queen Mother
165	Sir Iain Colquhoun, 7th Baronet			1887–1948	1937	Lord Lieutenant of Dunbartonshire
166	John Dalrymple, 12th Earl of Stair			1879–1961	1937	Lord Lieutenant of Wigtown
167	Philip Kerr, 11th Marquess of Lothian			1882–1940	1940	British Ambassador to the United States
168	Sir Archibald Sinclair, 4th Baronet			1890–1970	1940	Later Viscount Thurso
169	David Ogilvy, 12th Earl of Airlie			1893–1968	1942	Lord Chamberlain to The Queen
170	Andrew Cunningham, 1st Viscount Cunningham of Hyndhope			1883–1963	1945	First Sea Lord
171	James Graham, 6th Duke of Montrose			1878–1954	1947	Lord Lieutenant of Buteshire
172	Harry Primrose, 6th Earl of Rosebery			1882–1974	1947	Lord Lieutenant of Midlothian
173	Walter Montagu Douglas Scott, 8th Duke of Buccleuch			1894–1973	1949	Lord Lieutenant of Roxburghshire and former Lord Steward
174	Douglas Douglas-Hamilton, 14th Duke of Hamilton			1903–1973	1951	Lord Steward
175	George Baillie-Hamilton, 12th Earl of Haddington			1894–1986	1951	Vice-Lord-Lieutenant of East Lothian

== Elizabeth II ==
Elizabeth II (1952–2022)
N°	Name	Image	Arms	Life	Date	Notes
S14	Queen Elizabeth II			1926–2022	1952	Became sovereign of the order upon accession to the throne.
E14	Philip, Duke of Edinburgh			1921–2021	1952	Consort of Queen Elizabeth II
176	Steven Bilsland, 1st Baron Bilsland			1892–1970	1955	Honorary Colonel of the 8th Battalion Cameronians
177	David Lindsay, 28th Earl of Crawford			1900–1975	1955	Rector of the University of St Andrews
178	John Stirling			1893–1975	1956	Convener of the Ross and Cromarty County Council
179	George Mathers, 1st Baron Mathers			1886–1965	1956	Former Treasurer of the Household
180	Kenneth Fitzgerald Kinnaird, 12th Lord Kinnaird			1880–1972	1957	
181	Thomas Corbett, 2nd Baron Rowallan			1895–1977	1957	Chief Scout of the British Commonwealth and Empire
E15	Olav V, King of Norway			1903–1991	1962	Son of Princess Maud of Wales
182	Alexander Douglas-Home, 14th Earl of Home			1903–1995	1962	Prime Minister 1963–1964; Later Baron Home of the Hirsel
183	Robert Menzies			1894–1978	1963	Prime Minister of Australia 1939–1941 and 1949–1966
184	James Wilson Robertson			1899–1983	1965	Governor-General of Nigeria
185	David Charteris, 12th Earl of Wemyss			1912–2008	1966	Former Lord High Commissioner to the General Assembly of the Church of Scotland.
186	John Reith, 1st Baron Reith			1889–1971	1968	Former Director-General of the BBC
187	Charles Maclean, Baron Maclean			1916–1990	1969	Lord Lieutenant of Argyllshire
188	Simon Ramsay, 16th Earl of Dalhousie			1914–1999	1971	Lord Lieutenant of Angus
189	Richard O'Connor			1889–1981	1971	Former Lord Lieutenant of Ross and Cromarty
190	Ronald Colville, 2nd Baron Clydesmuir			1917–1996	1972	Lord Lieutenant of Lanarkshire
191	Robert Forbes-Leith			1902–1973	1972	Lord Lieutenant of Aberdeenshire
192	Harald Leslie, Lord Birsay			1905–1982	1973	Chairman of the Scottish Land Court
193	John Maclay, 1st Viscount Muirshiel			1905–1992	1973	Former Secretary of State for Scotland
194	Donald Hamish Cameron, 26th of Lochiel			1910–2004	1973	Lord Lieutenant of Inverness-shire
195	Bernard Fergusson, Baron Ballantrae			1911–1980	1974	Former Governor-General of New Zealand
196	George Douglas-Hamilton, 10th Earl of Selkirk			1906–1994	1976	Former First Lord of the Admiralty
197	William McFadzean, Baron McFadzean			1903–1996	1976	
E16	The Prince Charles, Duke of Rothesay			b. 1948	1977	Son of Queen Elizabeth II, now King of the United Kingdom
198	John Cameron, Lord Cameron			1900–1996	1978	Former President of the Royal Society of Edinburgh
199	John Scott, 9th Duke of Buccleuch			1923–2007	1978	Lord Lieutenant of Roxburgh, Ettrick and Lauderdale
200	Andrew Bruce, 11th Earl of Elgin			b. 1924	1981	Former Grand Master Mason of the Grand Lodge of Scotland
201	George Thomson, Baron Thomson of Monifieth			1921–2008	1981	Former European Commissioner for Regional Policy
202	Neil Cameron, Baron Cameron of Balhousie			1920–1985	1983	Former Chief of the Defence Staff
203	Murray MacLehose, Baron MacLehose of Beoch			1917–2000	1983	Former Governor of Hong Kong
204	David Ogilvy, 13th Earl of Airlie			1926–2023	1985	Lord Chamberlain of the Household
205	Iain Tennant			1919–2006	1986	Lord Lieutenant of Moray
206	William Whitelaw, 1st Viscount Whitelaw			1918–1999	1990	Former Lord President of the Council
207	Sir Fitzroy Maclean, 1st Baronet			1911–1996	1993	
208	George Younger, 4th Viscount Younger of Leckie			1931–2003	1995	Former Secretary of State for Defence
209	John Arbuthnott, 16th Viscount of Arbuthnott			1924–2012	1996	Lord Lieutenant of Kincardineshire
210	Robert Lindsay, 29th Earl of Crawford			1927–2023	1996	Lord Chamberlain to Queen Elizabeth The Queen Mother
211	Lady Marion Fraser			1932–2016	1996	
212	Norman Macfarlane, Baron Macfarlane of Bearsden			1926–2021	1996	
213	James Mackay, Baron Mackay of Clashfern			1927–2026	1997	Lord Chancellor
E17	The Princess Anne, Princess Royal			b. 1950	2000	Daughter of Queen Elizabeth II
214	David Wilson, Baron Wilson of Tillyorn			b. 1935	2000	Former Governor of Hong Kong
215	Stewart Sutherland, Baron Sutherland of Houndwood			1941–2018	2002	President of the Royal Society of Edinburgh
216	Eric Anderson			1936–2020	2002	Provost of Eton
217	David Steel, Baron Steel of Aikwood			b. 1938	2004	Former Presiding Officer of the Scottish Parliament
218	George Robertson, Baron Robertson of Port Ellen			b. 1946	2004	Former Secretary General of NATO
219	William Cullen, Baron Cullen of Whitekirk			b. 1935	2007	Former Lord Justice General and Lord President of the Court of Session.
220	Garth Morrison			1943–2013	2007	Chief Scout, Lord Lieutenant of East Lothian
221	David Hope, Baron Hope of Craighead			b. 1938	2009	Deputy President of the Supreme Court of the United Kingdom
222	Narendra Patel, Baron Patel			b. 1938	2009	Chancellor of the University of Dundee
E18	Prince William, Earl of Strathearn			b. 1982	2012	Grandson of Queen Elizabeth II, Lord High Commissioner to the General Assembly of the Church of Scotland in 2020 and 2021.
223	David Douglas-Home, 15th Earl of Home			1943–2022	2014	
224	Robert Smith, Baron Smith of Kelvin			b. 1944	2014	Former Governor of the British Broadcasting Corporation
225	Richard Scott, 10th Duke of Buccleuch			b. 1954	2017	Lord Lieutenant of Roxburgh, Ettrick and Lauderdale
226	Sir Ian Wood			1942–2026	2018	
227	Lady Elish Angiolini			b. 1960	2022	Former Lord Advocate
228	Sir George Reid			1939–2025	2022	Former Presiding Officer of the Scottish Parliament

== Charles III ==
Charles III (2022–)
N°	Name	Image	Arms	Life	Date	Notes
S15	King Charles III			b. 1948	2022	Became sovereign of the order upon accession to the throne. Previously an extra knight of the order.
E19	Queen Camilla			b. 1947	2023	Consort of King Charles III
E20	The Prince Edward, Duke of Edinburgh			b. 1964	2024	Brother of the King, twice Lord High Commissioner to the General Assembly of the Church of Scotland.
229	Sue Black, Baroness Black of Strome			b. 1961	2024	
230	Helena Kennedy, Baroness Kennedy of The Shaws			b. 1950	2024	
231	Sir Geoff Palmer			1940–2025	2024	
232	Sir Jim McDonald			b. 1957	2026	
233	Sir James MacMillan			b. 1959	2026	

== See also ==
- List of knights and ladies of the Garter
- List of knights of St Patrick
- List of knights and dames grand cross of the Order of the Bath
- List of knights and dames grand cross of the Order of St Michael and St George
- List of knights grand cross of the Order of the British Empire
