= George Baillie-Hamilton =

George Baillie-Hamilton may refer to:

- George Baillie-Hamilton, Lord Binning (1856–1917), British Army officer
- George Baillie-Hamilton, 14th Earl of Haddington (born 1985), British peer and landowner
- George Baillie-Hamilton, 10th Earl of Haddington (1802–1870), Scottish politician
- George Baillie-Hamilton, 12th Earl of Haddington (1894–1986), Scottish peer

== See also ==
- George Baillie-Hamilton-Arden, 11th Earl of Haddington (1827–1917), Scottish landowner and peer
