= Grisell Baillie =

Lady Grisell Baillie
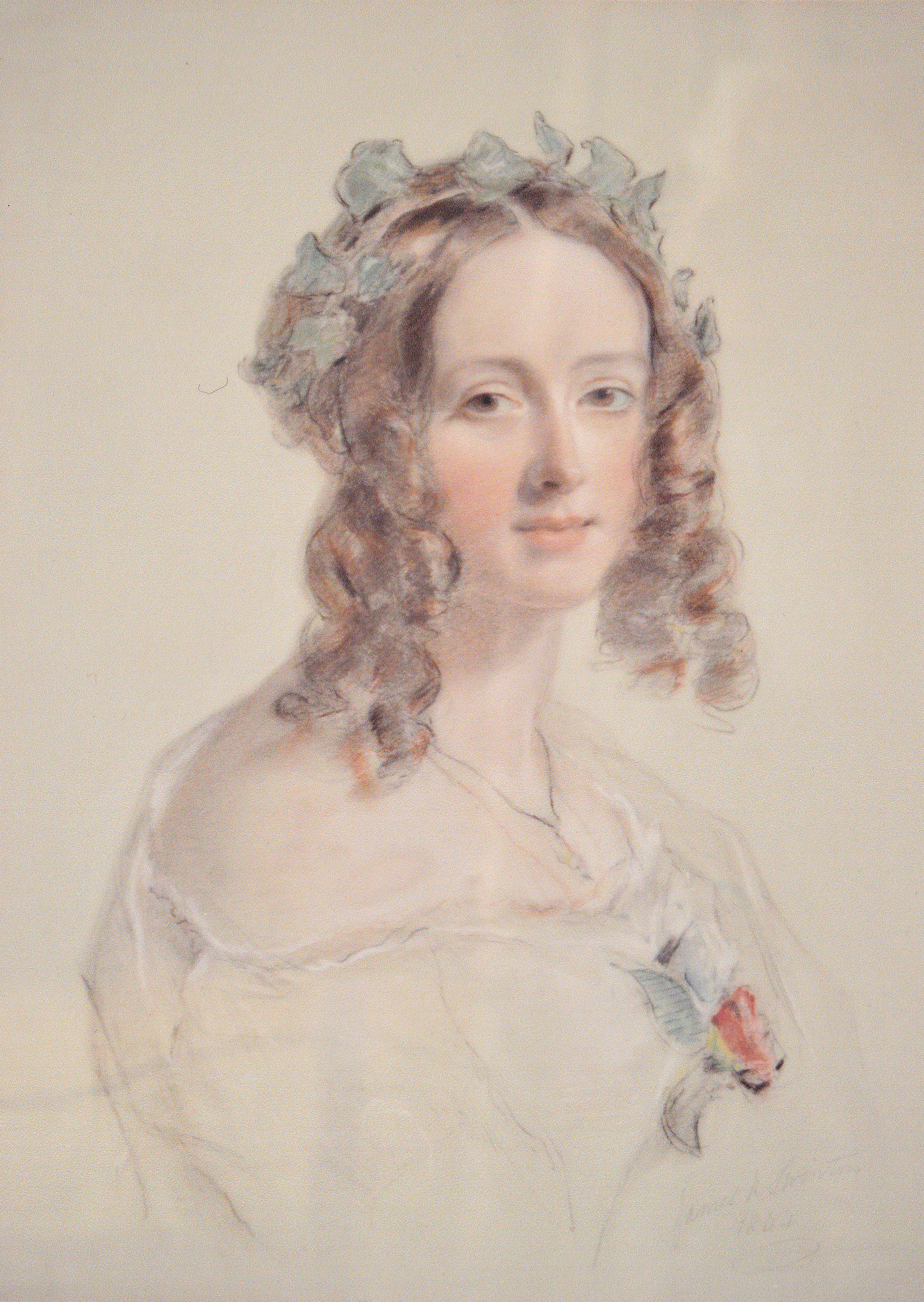
- Lady Grisell Baillie, painted in 1844 by James Swinton
- Born: 4 April 1822; Mellerstain House, Scottish Borders, Scotland
- Died: 20 December 1891 (aged 69)
- Occupation: Deaconess
- Known for: The first female deaconess in the Church of Scotland

Lady Grisell Baillie (4 April 1822 – 20 December 1891) was the first woman to be created a deaconess in the Church of Scotland.

== Biography ==
Grisell Baillie was born at her family home, Mellerstain House in the Scottish Borders, on 4 April 1822, and baptised on 6 June 1822. She was the youngest of the eleven children of George Baillie of Jerviswood, MP for Berwickshire, and Mary Pringle, daughter of Sir James Pringle, Baronet of Stichill. She was named after her ancestor Lady Grizel Baillie, a much admired and respected lady who died in 1746.

The Baillies were a Covenanting family and Grisell's ancestors included Robert Baillie who was put to death for his Covenanting beliefs and his alleged involvement in the Rye House Plot. Robert Baillie's great grandfather and Grisell's ancestor was John Knox.

Her father died in 1841 and the following year she and her mother moved to Eildon Hall near St Boswells. In 1858, both she and her brother Major Robert Baillie underwent a religious conversion. They ‘formed plans for the spiritual welfare of all amongst whom they lived’.

In 1859 they moved to another house, Maxpoffle, then to Dryburgh Abbey House in 1864. On Sundays, they left the house at 9.30am and went to the church to teach, pray and sing with the children (Lady Grisell was a fine singer) and stayed for services, returning home at 3pm. Major Robert had become an elder of Bowden Church (in 1854) where the minister was Dr. James Mackenzie Allardyce. Lady Grisell attended the church and for nearly fifty years she and her brother were responsible for the Sunday School. She carried out philanthropic work, providing a water supply for Newtown St Boswells and restoring a bridge over the River Tweed after flood damage. In 1878, after reading a pamphlet ‘The National Sin’ she gave up her habit of taking a small glass of wine with her meals. She embraced total abstinence and organised a Band of Hope in Newtown St Boswells. As well as being involved with the Temperance movement she supported the YWCA, young women's meetings and foreign missions.

In 1858 Grisell's oldest brother George inherited the title Earl of Haddington from a distant cousin, the 9th Earl, who had died childless. The courtesy title ‘Lady’ was given to Grisell by Queen Victoria.

Shortly before her mother's death in 1865, Grisell's brother Admiral Thomas Baillie had retired and lived with them at Dryburgh. Major Robert died in 1888 and such was her love and respect for him that she had the Baillie Hall in Newtown St. Boswells erected in his memory. They were described as ‘constant companions who walked with God and with each other in saintly lives of Christian service’. The plaque on the building says ‘In loving memory of Major Robert Baillie 1888’. The clock was added in memory of her brother Admiral Thomas Baillie who died in 1889.

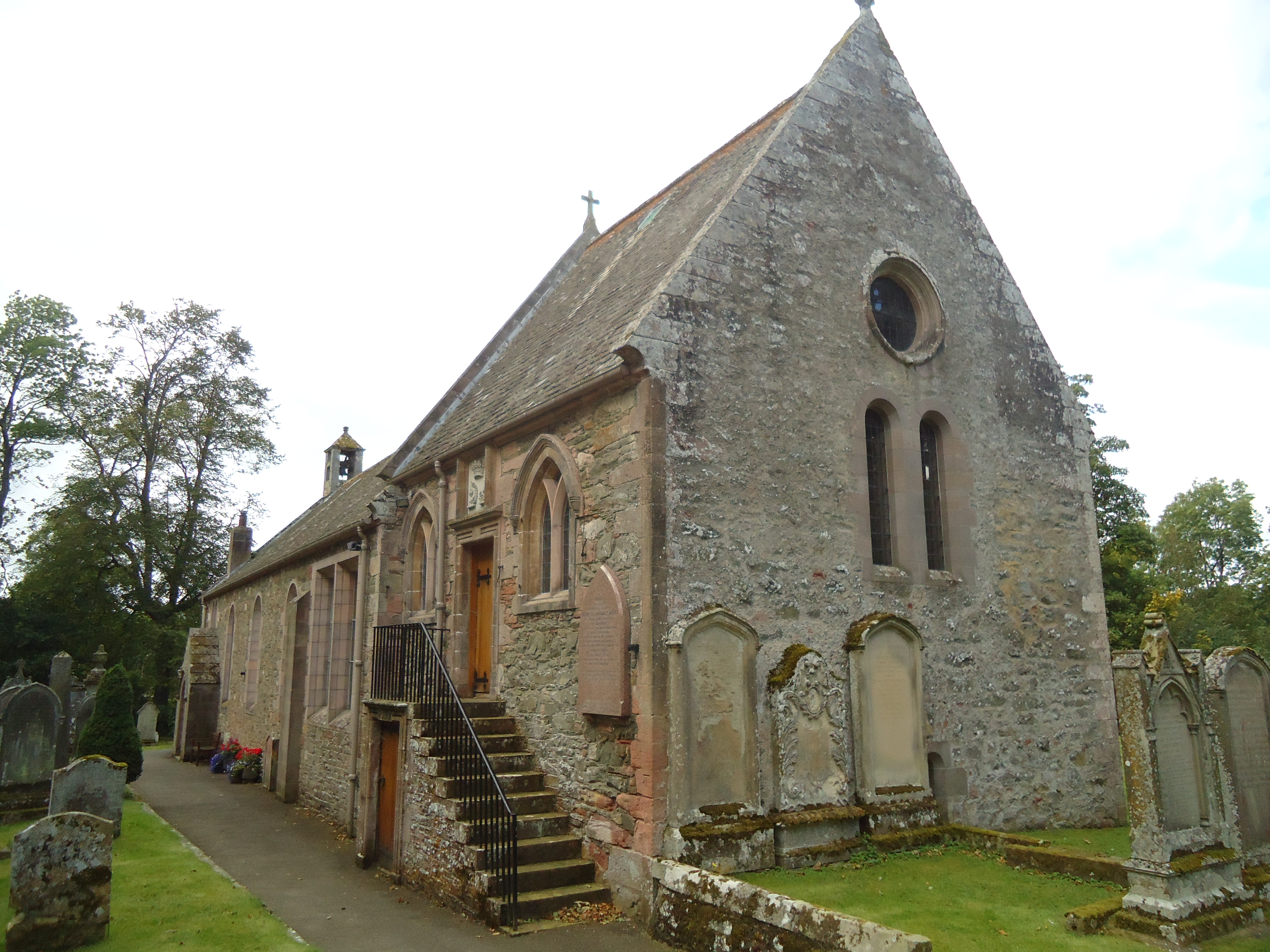
Bowden Church, Scottish Borders, where Lady Grisell Baillie was ordained as the first Deaconess in the Church of Scotland in 1888

On 9 December 1888 she was ordained at Bowden Kirk as the first deaconess of the Church of Scotland in a service conducted by Dr. Allardyce.

In 1890 Lady Grisell moved to The Holmes near Newtown St Boswells.

In November 1891 she attended the first conference of the Women's Guild in Edinburgh where she was the main speaker and presided over the morning session. For her opening address (‘delivered in ringing tones as of a silver trumpet’) she took the words ‘Go, work today in my vineyard.’ (Matthew 21:25-32) Two weeks later, on 20 December 1891, she died of influenza aged 69, and was buried at Mellerstain on 24 December.

There is a memorial tablet to Lady Grisell and Major Robert in Bowden Kirk.

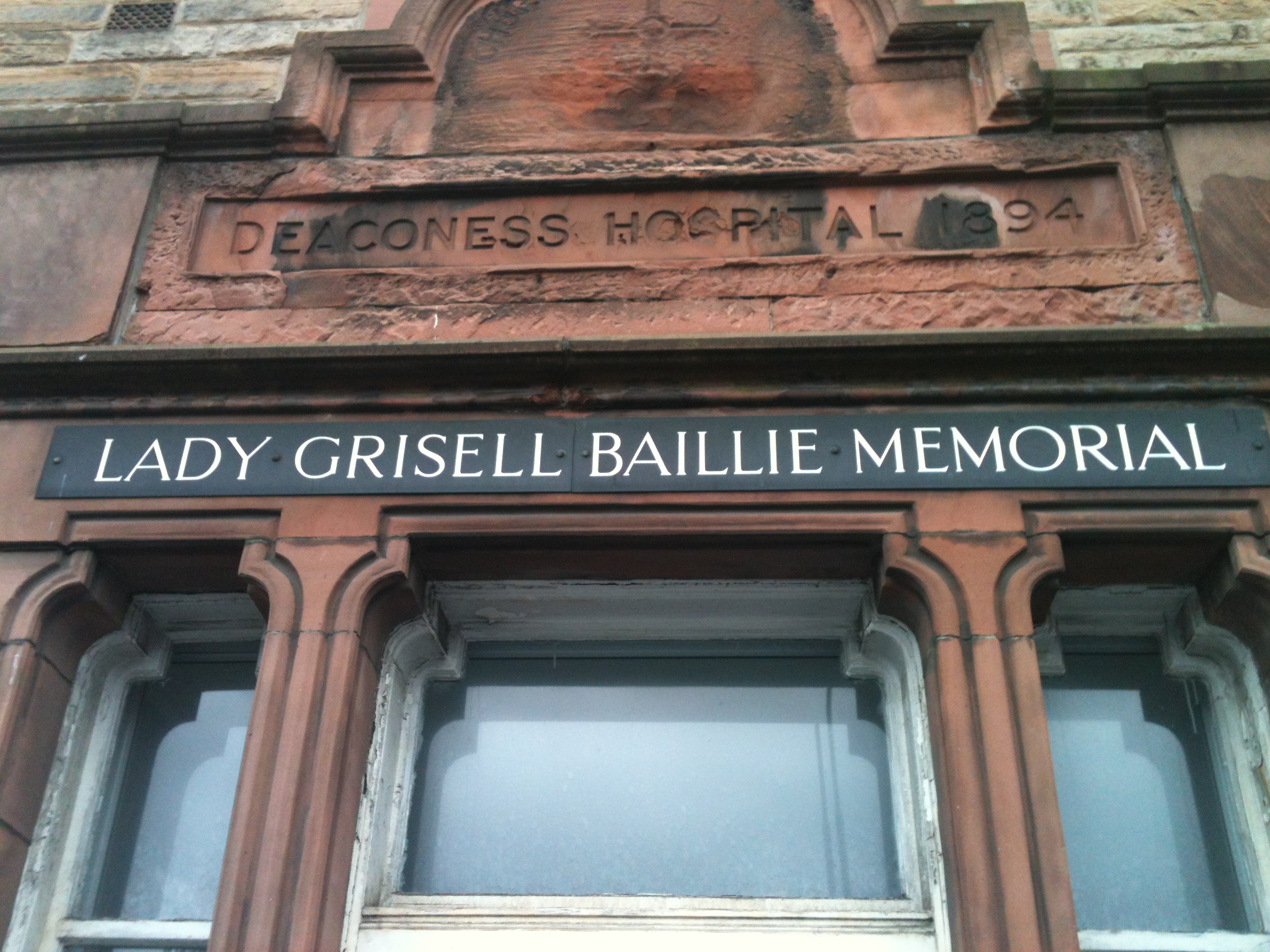
Deaconess Hospital, Edinburgh, Scotland, originally named after Lady Grisell Baillie

She was commemorated in 1894 by the opening of the Lady Grisell Baillie Memorial Hospital in Edinburgh which was later renamed the Deaconess Hospital. It closed in 1990 and for a time became Deaconess House, headquarters of Lothians NHS Trust. In Bowden Church a new communion table was given in her memory.

It was said of her that ‘She was beautiful, educated, gracious and above all a woman of deep faith, dedicated to the service of others. Not content with daily visits to the sick, teaching in Sunday School, the holding of meetings for young women, the organizing of bazaars to support foreign missions and so forth; she also provided a water supply for the village of St Boswells at her own expense and paid for the building of a new bridge across the Tweed.’

== Brothers and sisters ==
- George (1802–1870) became the 10th Earl of Haddington in 1858. Married Georgina Markham.
- Lady Elizabeth (1803–1861) married the 2nd Marquess of Breadalbane.
- Charles Lord Jerviswoode (1804–1879) married Anne Scott.
- James Pringle (1806–1842)
- Robert (1807–1888) became a major.
- The Revd The Hon John (1810–1888), Canon Residentiary of York. Married Cecilia Mary Hawkins in 1837.
- Thomas (1811–1889) became an admiral.
- Georgina (1812–1859) died in Nice. Married Henry Hepburne Scott, 7th Baron Polwarth.
- Lady Mary (1814–1900) married 5th Earl of Aberdeen.
- Lady Catherine-Charlotte (1818–1894) married the 4th Earl of Ashburnham.

Lady Grisell also had two half siblings:

- Janet Baillie (born 1793), mother Susan Miller.
- Lockhart Baillie (born 1799), mother Catherine Sangster.
