= Lady Mary Russell =

Scottish socialite (1934–2022)

Lady Mary Russell (née Baillie-Hamilton; 13 January 1934 – 18 September 2022) was a Scottish socialite who was a maid of honour at the coronation of Elizabeth II.

== Early life and family ==
Russell was born as Mary Baillie-Hamilton on 13 January 1934 to George Baillie-Hamilton, 12th Earl of Haddington. Her brother was a British peer, John Baillie-Hamilton, 13th Earl of Haddington. Her family is the owner of Tyninghame House.

When she was at the age of 10, a French governess started to homeschool her and continued until she was 13 years old. She attended Mayfield School, Mayfield.

She married twice, with Adrian Bailey in 1954 and with David Russell. When she died, just 10 days after Elizabeth II's death (and the night before her state funeral), Russell left behind five children and twelve grandchildren.

== Career ==
For a brief period, she worked at the Turner Archive, part of the Tate Gallery.

In 1953, she became a maid of honour at the coronation of Elizabeth II along with Lady Rosemary Spencer-Churchill, Anne Tennant, Baroness Glenconner, and Jane Heathcote-Drummond-Willoughby, 28th Baroness Willoughby de Eresby.

In the 1980s, she founded a business called Combe Manor Fabrics and later directed Whitchurch Silk Mill as a businesswoman.
