= Earl of Haddington =

Title in the Peerage of Scotland

Earldom of Haddington
- Blazon: Arms: Quarterly: 1st and 4th grandquarters, quarterly: 1st and 4th, Gules on a Chevron between three Cinquefoils Argent a Buckle Azure between two Ermine Spots all within a Bordure Or charged with eight Thistles Vert (Hamilton of Byres); 2nd and 3rd, Argent a Fess wavy between three Roses Gules barbed and seeded proper (Melrose); 2nd and 3rd grandquarters, Sable the Sun in his Glory between nine Stars three two three and one Argent (Baillie of Jerviswoode); Crest: 1st: Two dexter Hands issuing out of Clouds conjoined fesswise and holding betwixt them a Branch of Laurel erect all proper (Hamilton); 2nd: A Crescent Or (Baillie); Supporters: On either side a Talbot Argent plain collared Gules
- Creation date: 1627
- Created by: James VI and I
- Peerage: Peerage of Scotland
- First holder: Thomas Hamilton, 1st Earl of Haddington
- Present holder: George Baillie-Hamilton, 14th Earl of Haddington
- Heir apparent: Sullivan Simon Baillie-Hamilton, Lord Binning
- Subsidiary titles: Lord Binning; Viscount Maitland; Lord Byres and Binning
- Status: extant
- Seat: Mellerstain House
- Former seat: Tyninghame House

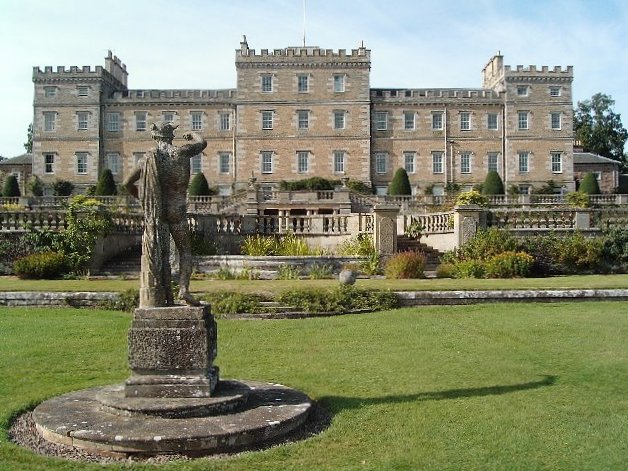
Mellerstain House

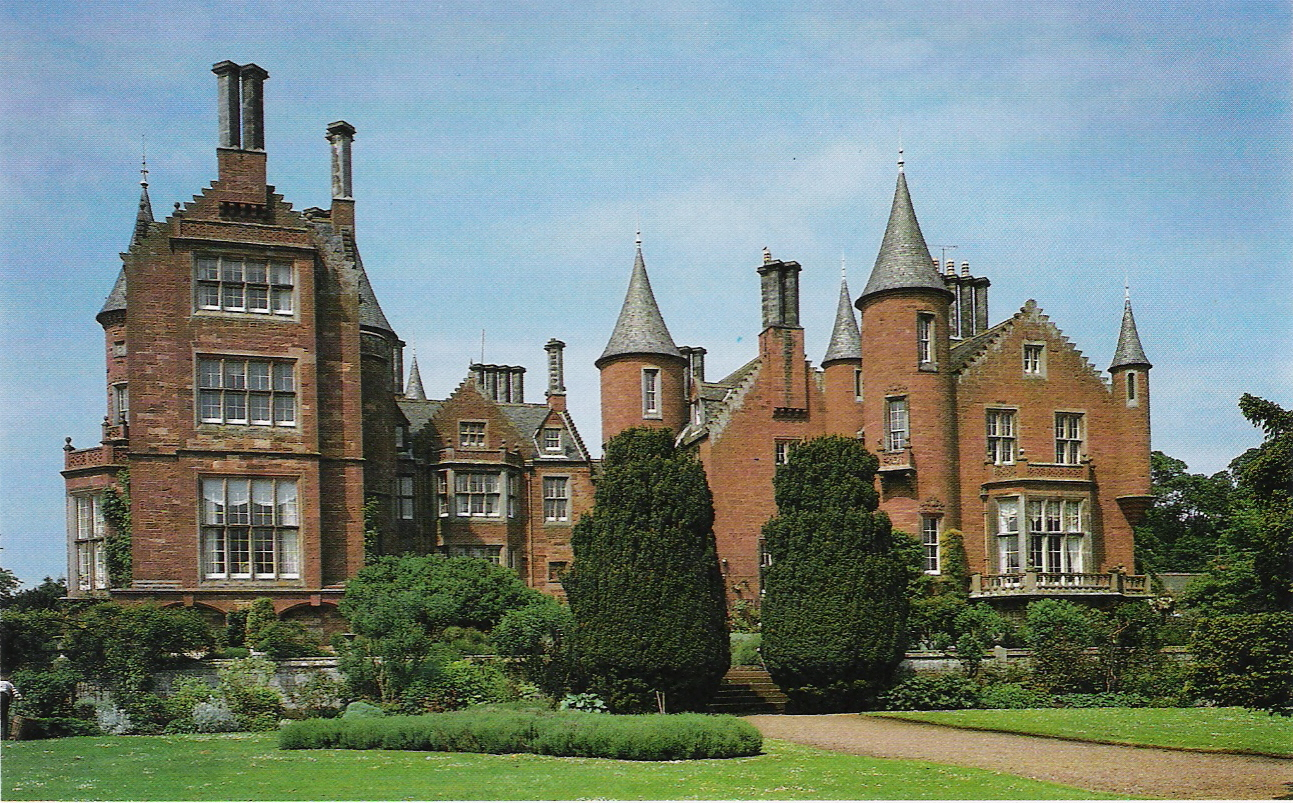
Tyninghame House

Earl of Haddington is a title in the Peerage of Scotland. It was created in 1627 for the noted Scottish lawyer and judge Thomas Hamilton, 1st Earl of Melrose. He was Lord President of the Court of Session from 1616 to 1625. Hamilton had already been created Lord Binning in 1613 and Lord Binning and Byres, in the County of Haddington, and Earl of Melrose, in the County of Roxburgh, in 1619. These titles were also in the Peerage of Scotland. The title of the earldom derived from the fact that he was in possession of much of the lands of the former Melrose Abbey. However, Hamilton was unhappy with this title and wished to replace it with "Haddington" (a title which was then held by John Ramsay, 1st Earl of Holderness and 1st Viscount of Haddington, but on whose death in 1626 both peerages became extinct). In 1627 he relinquished the earldom of Melrose and was instead created Earl of Haddington, with the precedence of 1619 and with limitation to his heirs male bearing the surname of Hamilton. This derived from the fact that he considered it a greater honour to take his title from a county rather than from an abbey. Hamilton was a member of the prominent Scottish family of that name and descended from John de Hamilton, younger son of Walter de Hamilton (or Walter Fitzgilbert), who was granted the feudal barony of Cadzow and who is also the ancestor of the Dukes of Hamilton and Dukes of Abercorn.

Lord Haddington was succeeded by his eldest son, the second Earl. He was a staunch Covenanter. Haddington served as Governor of the Castle of Dunglass, and was killed by a massive explosion there in 1640. His eldest son, the third Earl, died childless at an early age and was succeeded by his younger brother, the fourth Earl. On his death the titles passed to his son, the fifth Earl. He married Margaret Leslie, 8th Countess of Rothes (died 1700), daughter of the noted statesman John Leslie, 1st Duke of Rothes, who had received a re-grant of the earldom of Rothes in 1663 which allowed it to be passed on to his daughter (see the Earl of Rothes for earlier history of this title). According to the regrant of 1663, the earldom of Rothes was not allowed to be united with the earldom of Haddington. The couple were therefore in 1689 granted a patent of the marriage contract, which stated that the earldom of Rothes should descend to their eldest son, John, while the earldom of Haddington should be inherited by their second son, Thomas. According to this patent Lady Rothes was succeeded by her eldest son John, the ninth Earl (who assumed the surname of Leslie; see the Earl of Rothes for further history of this branch of the family).

Lord Haddington was succeeded accordingly by his second son Thomas, the sixth Earl. He obtained a new charter of the earldom. He sat in the House of Lords as a Scottish representative peer from 1716 to 1735 and served as Lord-Lieutenant of Haddingtonshire from 1716 to 1735. He was also appointed Hereditary Keeper of Holyrood Palace. His eldest son Charles Hamilton, Lord Binning, married Rachel (died 1773), daughter of George Baillie, of Mellerstain House and Jerviswood. Through this marriage Mellerstein House and the Jerviswood estate came into the Hamilton family. Lord Binning predeceased his father. Lord Haddington was therefore succeeded by his grandson, Thomas the seventh Earl (the eldest son of Lord Binning), who married Mary Lloyd, née Holt (great-niece of Sir John Holt, Lord Chief Justice 1689-1709). On his death the titles passed to his son Charles, the eighth Earl. He was a Scottish Representative Peer from 1807 to 1812 and Lord-Lieutenant of Haddingtonshire from 1804 to 1823. He was succeeded by his son, the ninth Earl. He was a Tory politician and served as Lord-Lieutenant of Ireland from 1834 to 1835 and as First Lord of the Admiralty (with a seat in the cabinet) from 1841 to 1846. In 1827, one year before he succeeded his father in the earldom, he was created Baron Melross, of Tyninghame in the County of Haddington, in the Peerage of the United Kingdom.

Keeper of Holyrood Park, etc. Act 1843
- Act of Parliament
- Parliament of the United Kingdom
- Long title: An Act for carrying into effect an Agreement between the Commissioners of Her Majesty's Woods and the Earl of Haddington, for the Purchase and Surrender of the Office of Hereditary Keeper of the Royal Park of Holyrood House; and for other Purposes relating thereto.
- Citation: 6 & 7 Vict. c. 64
- Territorial extent: United Kingdom

Dates
- Royal assent: 22 August 1843
- Commencement: 22 August 1843 (Note: The Acts of Parliament (Commencement) Act 1793.)

Status: Current legislation

Text of statute as originally enacted

Lord Haddington resigned the office of Hereditary Keeper of Holyrood Park in 1843 for a compensation fee of £40,000. He was childless and on his death in 1859 the barony of Melros became extinct.

The ninth Earl was succeeded in the Scottish titles by his second cousin, the tenth Earl. He was the son of George Baillie of Jerviswood (who had assumed the surname of Baillie in lieu of Hamilton), son of George Hamilton, younger brother of the seventh Earl. He assumed in 1859 by Royal licence the additional surname of Hamilton to that of Baillie. Lord Haddington was a Scottish Representative Peer in the House of Lords from 1859 to 1870 and served as a government whip in the 1866–1868 Conservative administration. On his death the titles passed to his son, the eleventh Earl. He was Lord-Lieutenant of Haddingtonshire from 1876 to 1917. In 1858 Haddington assumed by Royal licence the additional surname of Arden after that of Baillie-Hamilton. His eldest son George Baillie-Hamilton, Lord Binning (1856–1917), was a brigadier-general in the army. However, he predeceased his father. Lord Haddington was therefore succeeded by his grandson, the twelfth Earl. He was the son of Lord Binning. He sat in the House of Lords as a Scottish Representative Peer from 1922 to 1963 (when all Scottish peers were granted the right to sit in the House of Lords) and served as Lord-Lieutenant of Berwickshire from 1952 to 1969. He was succeeded by his only son, the thirteenth Earl (1941–2016), in 1986. As of 2017 the titles are held by his only son, the fourteenth Earl, who succeeded in 2016.

Several other members of the Baillie-Hamilton family have also gained distinction. George Baillie, son of George Hamilton, younger brother of the seventh Earl, sat as Member of Parliament for Berwickshire. He was the father of (apart from the tenth Earl) 1) the politician and judge Charles Baillie, Lord Jerviswoode, and 2) Reverend John Baillie (1810–1888), Canon Residentiary of York, who the great-grandfather of John Robert Edward Baillie, a Brigadier in the Royal Engineers. The Venerable Charles Baillie-Hamilton (1764–1820), son of George Hamilton, younger brother of the seventh Earl, was Archdeacon of Cleveland. He was the father of Charles John Baillie-Hamilton (1800–1865), a Member of Parliament, and William Alexander Baillie-Hamilton (1803–1881), an admiral in the Royal Navy.

The family seat now is Mellerstain House, near Kelso, Berwickshire. The former family seat was Tyninghame House, near Tyninghame, East Lothian.

== Earls of Haddington (1627) ==
- Thomas Hamilton, 1st Earl of Haddington (1563–1637)
- Thomas Hamilton, 2nd Earl of Haddington (1600–1640)
- Thomas Hamilton, 3rd Earl of Haddington (1626–1645)
- John Hamilton, 4th Earl of Haddington (1626–1669)
- Charles Hamilton, 5th Earl of Haddington (c. 1650 – 1685)
- Thomas Hamilton, 6th Earl of Haddington (1680–1735)
- Thomas Hamilton, 7th Earl of Haddington (1721–1794)
- Charles Hamilton, 8th Earl of Haddington (1753–1828)
- Thomas Hamilton, 9th Earl of Haddington (1780–1858) (created Baron Melrose in 1827)
- George Baillie-Hamilton, 10th Earl of Haddington (1802–1870)
- George Baillie-Hamilton-Arden, 11th Earl of Haddington (1827–1917)
- George Baillie-Hamilton, 12th Earl of Haddington (1894–1986)
- John Baillie-Hamilton, 13th Earl of Haddington (1941–2016)
- George Baillie-Hamilton, 14th Earl of Haddington (born 1985)

The heir apparent is the present holder's son, Sullivan Simon Baillie-Hamilton, Lord Binning (born 2022).

=== Male-line family tree ===
Hamilton family tree including the Earls of Haddington

Lord Binning, 1613; Earl of Melrose and Lord Binning and Byres, 1619; Earldom of Melrose relinquished in exchange for Earl of Haddington, 1629
Thomas Hamilton; 1563–1637; Earl of Melrose, 1st Earl of Haddington, etc.
Thomas Hamilton; 1600–1640; 2nd Earl of Haddington, etc.
Thomas Hamilton; 1626–1645; 3rd Earl of Haddington, etc. | John Hamilton; 1626–1669; 4th Earl of Haddington, etc.
Margaret Leslie; 8th Countess of Rothes d. 1700 | Charles Hamilton; 5th Earl of Haddington, etc. c. 1650–1685
John Hamilton-Leslie; 1679–1722; 9th Earl of Rothes | Thomas Hamilton; 1680–1735; 6th Earl of Haddington, etc.
Charles Hamilton; 1697–1723 styled Lord Binning
Thomas Hamilton; 1721–1794; 7th Earl of Haddington, etc. | George Baillie a. 1721 – 1797
Charles Hamilton; 1753–1828; 8th Earl of Haddington, etc. | Thomas Hamilton; 1758–1774 | George Baillie; 1763–1841
Baron Melrose (UK)
Thomas Hamilton; 1780–1858; 9th Earl of Haddington, etc. | George Baillie-Hamilton; 1802–1870; 10th Earl of Haddington, etc. | Charles Baillie; 1804–1879 styled Lord Jerviswoode | James Baillie; 1806–? | Rev. John Baillie; 1810–1888
Barony Melrose extinct
George Baillie-Hamilton-Arden; 1827–1917; 11th Earl of Haddington, etc. | Maj. Robert Baillie-Hamilton; 1828–1891 | Cdr. Henry Baillie-Hamilton; 1832–1895 | Rev. Arthur Baillie-Hamilton; 1838–1910 | Hugh Baillie; 1838–1923 | Rev. Thomas Baillie; 1842–1917
George Baillie-Hamilton; 1856–1917 styled Lord Binning | Lt. Richard Baillie-Hamilton; 1858–1881 | Capt. Henry Baillie-Hamilton; 1862–1949 | John Baillie b. 1888 | Richard Baillie; 1869–1945
George Baillie-Hamilton; 1894–1986; 12th Earl of Haddington, etc. | Charles Baillie-Hamilton; 1900–1939 | Brig. Jock Hamilton-Baillie; 1919–2003
John Baillie-Hamilton; 1941–2016; 13th Earl of Haddington, etc. | Lt.Col. Thomas Hamilton-Baillie b. 1948 | John Hamilton-Baillie b. 1955
George Baillie-Hamilton; 14th Earl of Haddington, etc. b. 1985 | Laurence Hamilton-Baillie b. 1990
Sullivan Baillie-Hamilton styled Lord Binning b. 2022

== See also ==
- Earl of Rothes

== Bibliography ==
- Hesilrige, Arthur G. M. (1921). Debrett's Peerage and Titles of courtesy. 160A, Fleet street, London, UK: Dean & Son. p. 429.
- Kidd, Charles; Williamson, David, eds. (1990). Debrett's Peerage and Baronetage. New York: St Martin's Press.
- Mosley, Charles (1999). Burke's Peerage and Baronetage (106th ed.).
- Mosley, Charles (2003). Burke's Peerage and Baronetage (107th ed.).
- Cokayne, George E.; Gibbs, Vicary; Doubleday, Harry; de Walden, Lord Howard (1958). The Complete Peerage of Great Britain and Ireland both extant and extinct since earliest times to the present day. Vol. XIV. London and New York: St Catherine's Press.
