= Helen Hope =

- Born: 1677
- Died: 19 April 1768 (aged 90–91)
- Title: Countess of Haddington
- Spouse: Thomas Hamilton, 6th Earl of Haddington (m. 1696; died 1735)
- Children: Charles Hamilton, Lord Binning; Hon. John Hamilton; Lady Margaret Hamilton; Lady Christian Hamilton
- Parents: John Hope of that ilk (father); Lady Margaret Hamilton (mother)

Helen Hope, Countess of Haddington (1677 – 19 April 1768) was a Scottish forester. She planted many trees in Haddingtonshire and created Binning Wood at Tyninghame.

== Early life ==
Helen Hope was born to Lady Margaret Hamilton and John Hope in Kirkliston, Linlithgowshire. She was baptised on 28 September 1677. Hope's brother Charles was born in 1681 and later became a peer and governor of the Bank of Scotland. When she was five, her father drowned whilst travelling with the Duke of York (later to be King James VII of Scotland).

== Career ==
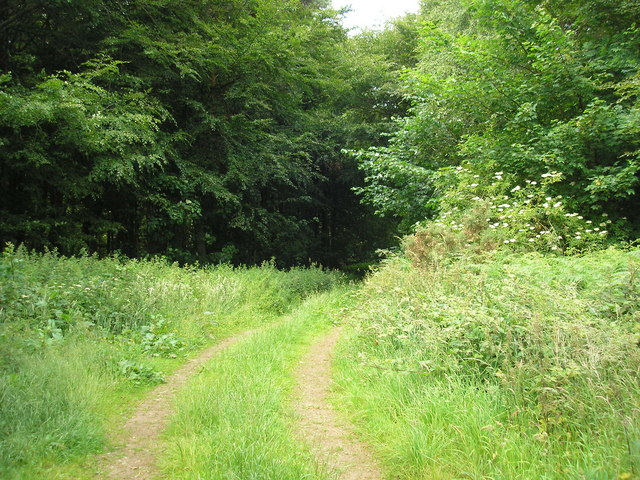
Binning Wood in 2009

Hope lived with her husband at Leslie House in Fife and had the first of four children, who was named Charles and had the title of Lord Binning from birth. Charles would become a politician and Knight Marshal of Scotland. In 1700, the family moved to the earl's ancestral home, Tyninghame House in Haddingtonshire. Hope immediately wanted to plant trees despite the initial lack of interest of her husband and local people.

She decided to plant trees on the moorland of Tyninghame and call it Binning Wood in honour of her son. The 800-acre (320 ha) estate was planted with 50 species of tree. In addition, she created a wilderness zone and a bowling green from where 14 walks began. Her husband wrote Short Treatise on Forest Trees (published posthumously in 1756 and later reissued as Treatise on the Manner of Raising Forest Trees in 1761), in which he praised Hope's efforts.

== Marriage and issue ==
Hope's mother arranged her marriage to her first cousin Thomas Hamilton, 6th Earl of Haddington in 1696, both being grandchildren of John Hamilton, 4th Earl of Haddington, at which point she became the Countess of Haddington. They had issue:

- Charles Hamilton, Lord Binning (1697–1732) predeceased his parents.
- Hon. John Hamilton (d.1772)
- Lady Margaret Hamilton (d.1768)
- Lady Christian Hamilton (d.1770) married Sir James Dalrymple, 2nd Baronet mother to David Dalrymple, Lord Hailes

Her granddaughter, Margaret Hamilton (daughter of John), married James Buchanan of Drumpellier twice Lord Provost of Glasgow.

== Death and legacy ==
Hope died in Edinburgh on 19 April 1768 at the age of 90. She was buried alongside her husband (who had predeceased her) at Tyninghame. An obelisk constructed in 1856 by Thomas Hamilton, 9th Earl of Haddington pays tribute to the couple's extensive planting.

Binning Wood was clearfelled in the 1940s as part of the war effort. The Landowners’ Co-operative Society Limited of Edinburgh recorded 89% of the wood was hardwood (oak and beech) and the remainder was softwood, mainly Scots pine. Some of the beechwood was used to construct de Havilland Mosquito fighter planes. It was replanted in a program which took until 1960 to complete, with the trees mainly being Scots pine since hardwood seedlings were not available. The earl of Haddington ensured the original 1707 layout was adhered to and the work was done by Italian prisoners of war. In the 2010s, part of the wood became a green funeral site, with individual plots costing £950.
