= Charles Hamilton, Lord Binning =

Scottish nobleman and politician (1697–1732)

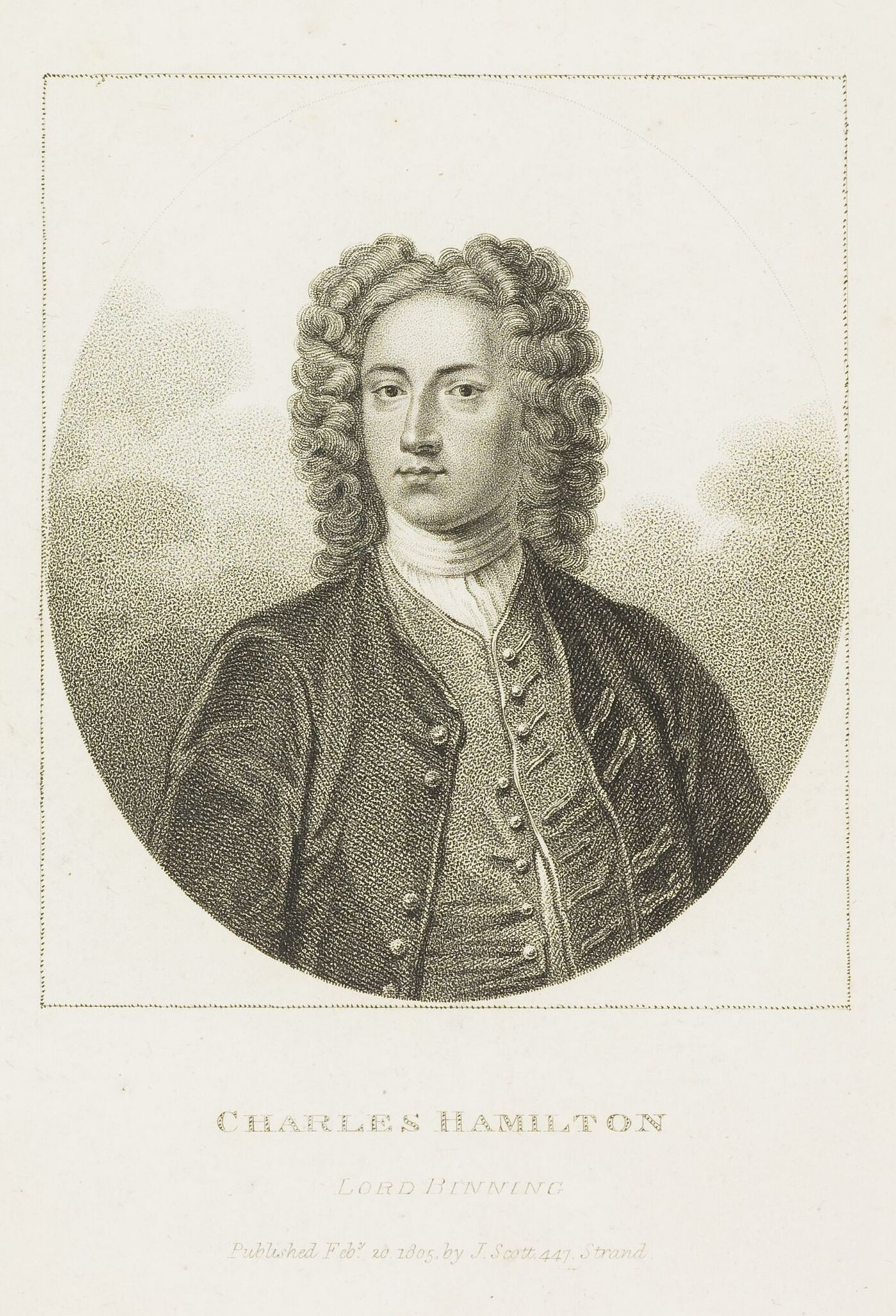
Charles Hamilton

Charles Hamilton, Lord Binning (1697 – 27 December 1732), was a Scottish nobleman, politician and poet.

== Life ==
The son of Thomas Hamilton, 6th Earl of Haddington, and Helen Hope, he used the courtesy title Lord Binning from birth.

Lord Binning was present with his father at the Battle of Sheriffmuir, in 1715. From 1718 until his death he held office as Knight Marischal, an office that had been vacant since the battle following the forfeiture of the Jacobite, Earl of Kintore.

He was elected at the 1722 general election as a member of parliament (MP) for borough of St Germans in Cornwall, and held the seat until the 1727 general election.

Lord Binning had an important influence on the decision of his father-in-law, George Baillie of Jerviswood, to build Mellerstain House, and he took an active interest in the design of its policies.

In 1731, and in increasingly frail health, Lord Binning, accompanied by the Baillie family, left Britain for the continent, and settled in Naples, where he died on 27 December 1732.

== Marriage and issue ==
On 3 September 1717, he married Rachel Baillie, the daughter of George Baillie of Jerviswood and Mellerstain and Lady Grisell Baillie. His wife outlived Binning for 41 years, dying at Mellerstain in 1773.

- Thomas Hamilton, 7th Earl of Haddington.
- George Baillie-Hamilton, grandfather to George Baillie-Hamilton, 10th Earl of Haddington
- Grizel Hamilton, married Philip Stanhope, 2nd Earl Stanhope

Parliament of the United Kingdom
Preceded by Lord Stanhope; John Knight	Member of Parliament for St Germans; 1722–1727; With: Philip Cavendish	Succeeded by Sir Gilbert Heathcote; Sidney Godolphin
