= Charles Hamilton, 8th Earl of Haddington =

Scottish nobleman

Charles Hamilton, 8th Earl of Haddington DL (5 July 1753 – 17 March 1828) was a Scottish nobleman.

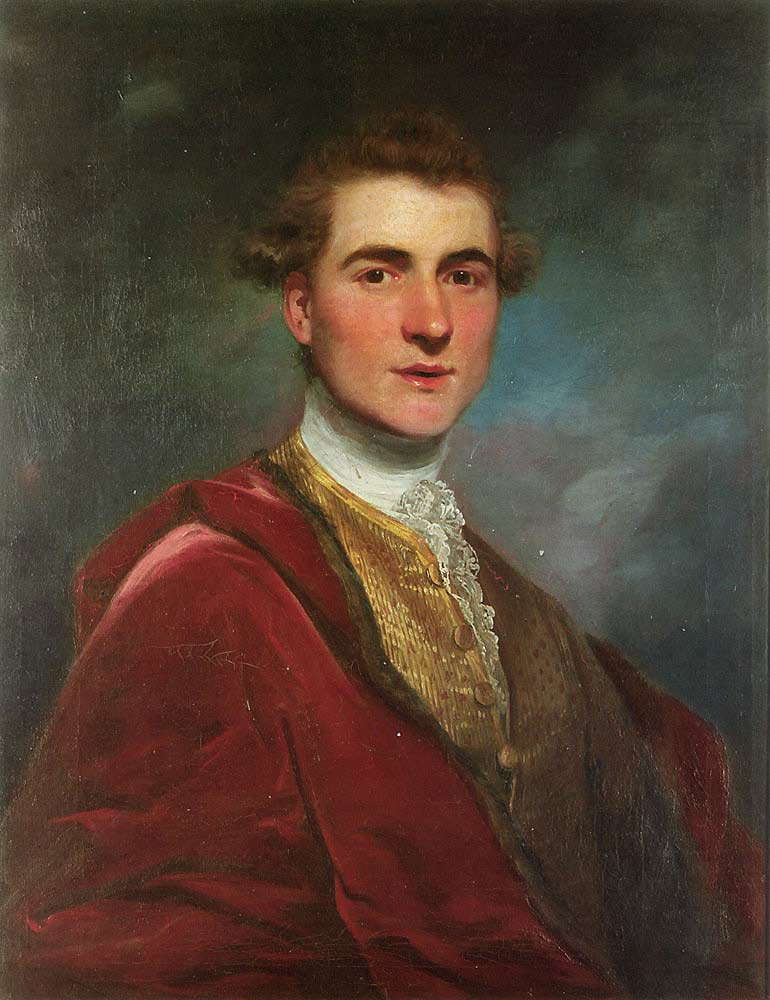
Charles Hamilton, 8th Earl of Haddington by Reynolds

== Life ==
Haddington was the eldest son of Thomas Hamilton, 7th Earl of Haddington and Mary Lloyd. Following his accession to the Earldom of Haddington, he was elected a Scottish representative peer from 1807 to 1812. He held the office of Lord Lieutenant of Haddingtonshire from 1804 to 1823. As the hereditary keeper of Holyrood Park in Edinburgh, Haddington caused some controversy by refusing to allow member of the Aesculapian Club to extend paths and plant areas of the park. He caused further controversy, when he opened the Camstane Quarry on Salisbury Crags to provide paving stones for London. The public outcry led the House of Lords to strip his son, Thomas Hamilton, the 9th Earl, of his hereditary rights as Keeper of the King's Park in 1831. However Thomas was paid £40,000 (equivalent to £4.5 million in 2022) in compensation for the loss of this role.

Lord Haddington died 17 March 1828.

== Marriage and issue ==
Lord Haddington married on 30 April 1779 to Lady Sophia Hope (d.1813), daughter of John Hope, 2nd Earl of Hopetoun and had issue:

- Thomas Hamilton, 9th Earl of Haddington

== Sources ==
- Anderson, J., Historical and genealogical memoirs of the House of Hamilton; with genealogical memoirs of the several branches of the family, Edinburgh 1825.
- Balfour Paul, Sir J., Scots Peerage IX vols. Edinburgh 1904.

Peerage of Scotland
Preceded by Thomas Hamilton	Earl of Haddington; 1794–1828	Succeeded by Thomas Hamilton
