= John Baillie-Hamilton, 13th Earl of Haddington =

The Right Honourable The Earl of Haddington

Member of the House of Lords Lord Temporal
- In office 17 April 1986 – 11 November 1999
- Preceded by: The 12th Earl of Haddington
- Succeeded by: Seat abolished

Personal details
- Born: John George Baillie-Hamilton; 21 December 1941
- Died: 5 July 2016 (aged 74)
- Occupation: Photographer, politician and peer

John George Baillie-Hamilton, 13th Earl of Haddington (21 December 1941 – 5 July 2016), was a British peer and politician of the Conservative Party. He was also a photographer and explorer of the paranormal.

Baillie-Hamilton born in December 1941, was the second child and only son of George Baillie-Hamilton, 12th Earl of Haddington and Sarah née Cook (died 1995). He attended Ampleforth College, Trinity College, Dublin, and the Royal Agricultural College. He worked as a photographer and published the magazine The Bird Table. He also worked with the Lebanese Tourist Board and the Centre for Crop Circle Studies. In 1998, he founded the charitable organization Save Our Songbirds, now Songbird Survival.

After his father's death in 1986, Baillie-Hamilton inherited the title of Earl of Haddington, aged 44 years. Thus, he acquired the then-associated seat in the House of Lords. This he lost due to the House of Lords Act 1999. He applied for an elected seat, but only came 91st place on his party list. Of these 42 seats were awarded.

Baillie-Hamilton lived on the estate of Mellerstain House in Berwickshire.

On 19 April 1975, Baillie-Hamilton married Prudence Elizabeth Hayles. They divorced in 1981. He married again on 2 December 1984 to Jane Heyworth. The marriage produced three children, two daughters and a son:

- George Edmund Baldred Baillie-Hamilton (b. 1985), who is now the 14th Earl of Haddington
- Lady Susan Moyra Baillie-Hamilton (b. 1988)
- Lady Isobel Joan Baillie-Hamilton (b. 1990)

Peerage of Scotland
Preceded by George Baillie-Hamilton	Earl of Haddington; 1986–2016; Member of the House of Lords (1986–1999)	Succeeded by George Baillie-Hamilton
