= George Baillie (MP, born 1763) =

Scottish MP for Berwickshire (1796–1818)

Member of Parliament for Berwickshire
- In office 1796–1818
- Preceded by: Patrick Home
- Succeeded by: John Marjoribanks

Personal details
- Born: 8 October 1763
- Died: 11 December 1841 (aged 78)
- Spouse: Mary Baillie (née Pringle)
- Children: 11, including George, Charles, and Grisell
- Parents: George Baillie (father); Elizabeth Baillie (née Andrews) (mother)
- Education: Trinity College, Cambridge

George Baillie (8 October 1763 – 11 December 1841) was the Scottish MP for Berwickshire from 1796 till 1818.
