= George Baillie-Hamilton, 10th Earl of Haddington =

Scottish Conservative politician

Arms of the Earls of Haddington

George Baillie-Hamilton, 10th Earl of Haddington DL (14 April 1802 – 25 June 1870), known as George Baillie until 1858, was a Scottish Conservative politician.

== Early life ==
Haddington was the son of George Baillie and his wife Mary (née Pringle). Charles Baillie, Lord Jerviswoode, was his younger brother. His father, George Baillie of Mellerstain House and Jerviswood (1763–1841), was the son of the Hon. George Hamilton, younger brother of Thomas Hamilton, 7th Earl of Haddington.

== Career ==
He succeeded his second cousin Thomas Hamilton, 9th Earl of Haddington in the earldom in 1858, and in 1859 he assumed by Royal licence the additional surname of Hamilton.

The latter year he was also elected a Scottish representative peer and took his seat on the Conservative benches in the House of Lords. He served under the Earl of Derby and Benjamin Disraeli as a Lord-in-waiting (government whip in the House of Lords) from 1867 to 1868. Between 1867 and 1868 he was also Lord High Commissioner to the General Assembly of the Church of Scotland.

== Death ==
Lord Haddington died at Tyninghame House on 25 June 1870, aged 68.

== Marriage and issue ==
Lord Haddington married Georgina Markham (d. 26 February 1873), daughter of the Venerable Robert Markham, Archdeacon of York, on 16 December 1824 and had issue:

- George Baillie-Hamilton-Arden, 11th Earl of Haddington
- Hon Robert Baillie-Hamilton (1828-1891) MP for Berwickshire
- Hon. Clifton Baillie-Hamilton (1831-1857)
- Cdr. the Hon. Henry Baillie-Hamilton
- Hon. Percy Baillie-Hamilton died in infancy
- Rev the Hon. Arthur Baillie-Hamilton, vicar of Badley
- Lady Mary Baillie-Hamilton
- Lady Frances Baillie-Hamilton
- Lady Georgina Baillie-Hamilton

== Notes ==
Peerage of Scotland
Preceded by Thomas Hamilton	Earl of Haddington; 1858–1870	Succeeded by George Baillie-Hamilton-Arden
