= Charles Douglas-Home, 12th Earl of Home =

Scottish peer (1834–1918)

The Right Honourable The Earl of Home KT TD
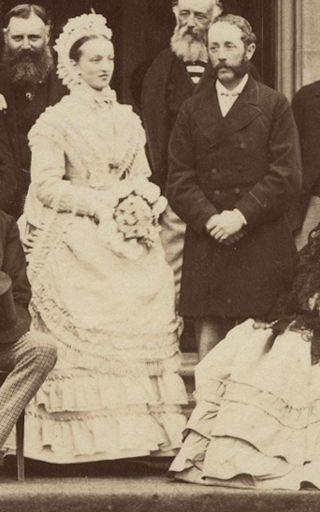
- An 1870 photo of Charles Douglas-Home, 12th Earl of Home, with his wife Maria

Member of the House of Lords Lord Temporal
- In office 4 July 1881 – 30 April 1918; Hereditary peerage
- Preceded by: The 11th Earl of Home
- Succeeded by: The 13th Earl of Home

Personal details
- Born: Charles Alexander Home; 11 April 1834
- Died: 30 April 1918 (aged 84)
- Children: 5, including Charles

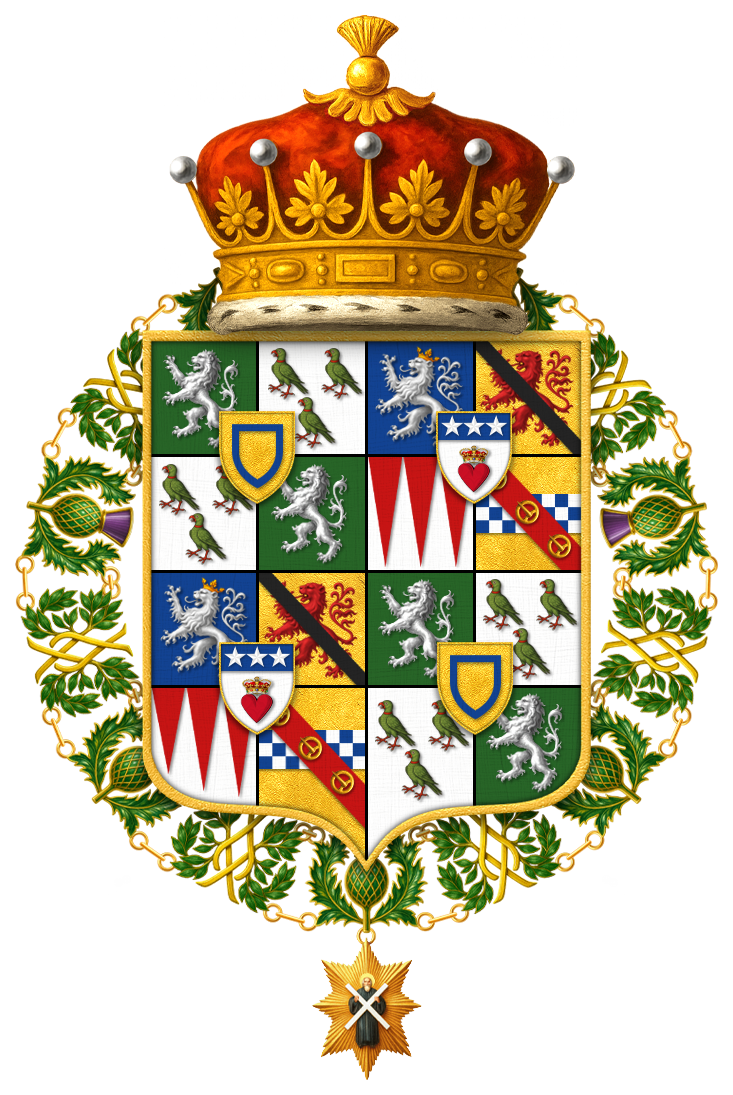
Shield of Arms of Charles Alexander Douglas-Home, 12th Earl of Home, KT, TD

Charles Alexander Douglas-Home, 12th Earl of Home, KT, TD (11 April 1834 – 30 April 1918), styled Lord Dunglass between 1841 and 1881, was a British politician and nobleman. He served as Lord Lieutenant of Berwickshire from 1879 to 1880 and Lord Lieutenant of Lanarkshire from 1890 to 1915.

== Background ==
Home was born at The Hirsel near Coldstream, the son of Cospatrick Douglas-Home, 11th Earl of Home, and Hon. Lucy Elizabeth Montagu-Scott, daughter of Henry, 2nd Baron Montagu of Boughton, and his wife, Hon. Jane Douglas (the daughter of Archibald, 1st Baron Douglas). He was educated at Eton College and Trinity College, Cambridge. In 1877, he inherited the extensive Douglas and Angus estates from his mother. These included Douglas Castle, Bothwell Castle, and lands totalling some 104,000 acres, chiefly in Lanarkshire, Roxburghshire and Berwickshire. In 1877, his name was legally changed to Charles Alexander Douglas-Home by Royal Licence. He inherited his father's titles and Berwickshire estate at The Hirsel in 1881.

== Offices ==
He held the office of Lord Lieutenant of Berwickshire between 1879 and 1890. He served as aide-de-camp to Queen Victoria between 1887 and 1897. He served as Lord Lieutenant of Lanarkshire from 1890 to 1915. He held the office of Captain of the Royal Company of Archers. He gained the rank of Honorary Colonel in the service of the 3rd and 4th Battalions, Scottish Rifles and Lanarkshire Yeomanry. In 1899, he was invested as a Knight of the Order of the Thistle. He received the Territorial Decoration.

== Family ==
Lord Home married Maria Grey, the daughter of Captain Charles Conrad Grey, RN (and great-niece of Charles, 2nd Earl Grey) on 18 August 1870. They had five children:

- Charles Cospatrick Archibald Douglas-Home, 13th Earl of Home (1873–1951);
- Lady Mary Elizabeth Margaret Douglas-Home (died 1951), married Richard Meade, Lord Gillford, eldest son of 4th Earl of Clanwilliam;
- Lady Issobel Charlotte Douglas-Home (died 1934), unmarried;
- Lady Beatrix Douglas-Home (died 1940), married Sir Henry Dundas, 3rd Baronet of Arniston; and
- Lady Margaret Jane Douglas-Home (died 1955), married Reginald Walsh, 5th Baron Ormathwaite.

== Labrador Retrievers ==
During the 1880s, Lord Home alongside his cousin the 6th Duke of Buccleuch and the 3rd Earl of Malmesbury collaborated to develop and establish the modern breed of Labrador Retriever, by interbreeding lines originally imported by their respective families from Newfoundland in the 1830s. The resulting offspring are considered to be the ancestors of modern Labradors.

Honorary titles
Preceded by The Duke of Roxburghe	Lord Lieutenant of Berwickshire; 1879–1880	Succeeded by The Earl of Lauderdale
Preceded by Sir Thomas Colebrooke	Lord Lieutenant of Lanarkshire; 1890–1915	Succeeded by The Lord Newlands
Peerage of Scotland
Preceded by Cospatrick Douglas-Home	Earl of Home; 1881–1918	Succeeded by Charles Douglas-Home
