= George Baillie-Hamilton, 12th Earl of Haddington =

Scottish peer (1894–1986)

Haddington at Musselburgh Racecourse with his wife Sarah (right), 1925

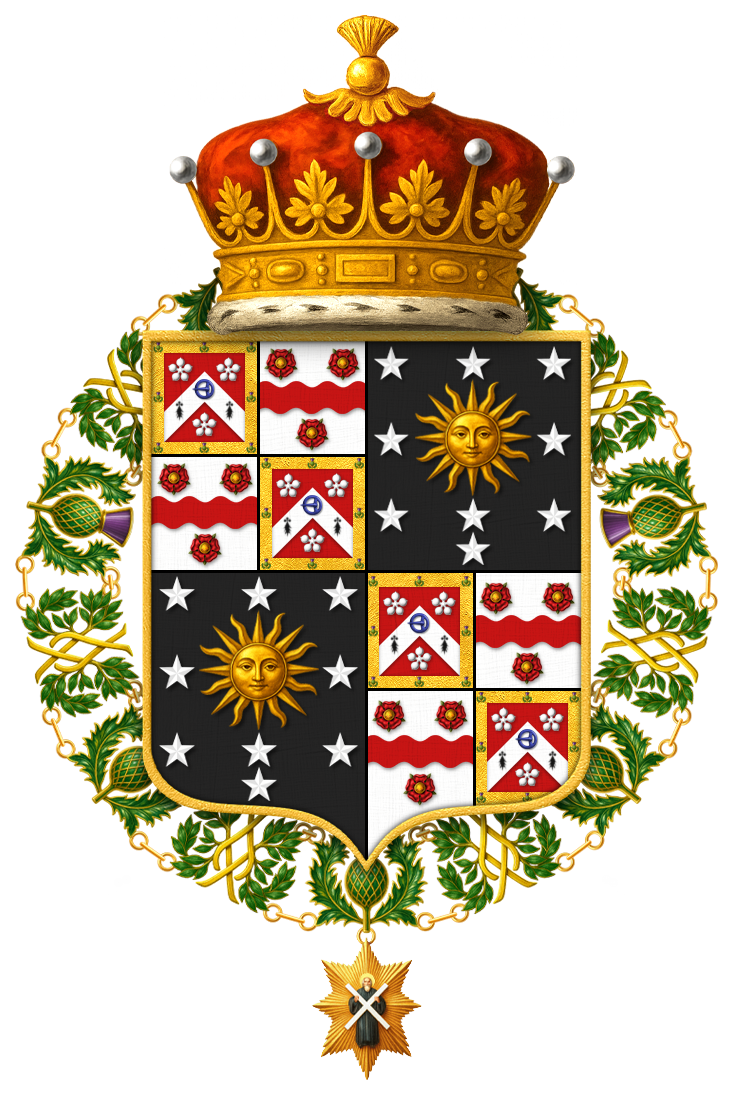
Shield of Arms of George Baillie-Hamilton, 12th Earl of Haddington, KT, MC, TD, FRSE

George Baillie-Hamilton, 12th Earl of Haddington KT MC TD FRSE (18 September 1894 – 17 April 1986), was a Scottish peer from 1917 to 1986.

== Life ==
Haddington was the son of Brigadier-General George Baillie-Hamilton, Lord Binning and Katherine Salting (d.1952).

He was educated at Eton and then at Sandhurst. He was on the staff of Governor General of Canada and was awarded the Military Cross during the First World War. He succeeded his grandfather in the earldom in 1917. In the Second World War he was a Wing Commander in the RAFVR. He was Lord Lieutenant of Berwickshire from 1952 to 1969. In 1957 he became the first president of the Georgian Group of Edinburgh, later the Architectural Heritage Society of Scotland. He lived at Tyninghame House in East Lothian, where he and his wife created and replanted several formal gardens.

His daughter, Lady Mary, was one of Queen Elizabeth II's maids of honour at the coronation in 1953.

== Military career ==
He fought in the First World War, as a captain in the service of the 2nd Dragoons (Royal Scots Greys), where he was wounded. He went on to gain the rank of Wing Commander in the Royal Air Force Volunteer Reserve; and Major in the 19th Lothians and Border Horse Armoured Car Company Territorial Army, as well as Captain of the Royal Company of Archers.

== Public office ==
The Earl was a Representative Peer of Scotland between 1922 and 1958. He was Deputy Lieutenant (D.L.) of East Lothian 1929–1946, Vice-Lord-Lieutenant of East Lothian 1946–1952, and Lord-Lieutenant of East Lothian 1952–1970. He also served as a Justice of the Peace (J.P.) in East Lothian and Berwickshire. He was invested as a Knight Companion of the Order of the Thistle on 6 December 1951. He was awarded the honorary degree of Doctor of Law (LL. D.) by Glasgow University in 1957.

== Marriage and family ==
He married Sarah Cook (1903-1995), daughter of George William Cook, on 10 September 1923.

They had two children:

- Lady Mary Baillie-Hamilton, (13 January 1934 - 18 September 2022).
- John George Baillie-Hamilton, 13th Earl of Haddington (21 December 1941 – 5 July 2016).

The 12th Earl died in 1986.

Honorary titles
Preceded by The Earl of Home	Lord Lieutenant of Berwickshire; 1952–1969	Succeeded by Sir William Swan
Peerage of Scotland
Preceded by George Baillie-Hamilton	Earl of Haddington; 1917–1986	Succeeded by John George Baillie-Hamilton
