= William Swan (British Army officer) =

Lieutenant-Colonel Sir William Bertram Swan KCVO CBE TD DL JP (19 September 1914 – 4 December 1990) was a British Army officer and agriculturalist.

== Early life ==
Swan was eldest son of Nichol Allan Swan and Anne Gardener Keir. He was educated at Edinburgh Academy and entered farming in 1933.

== Military career ==
On 13 May 1939 he was commissioned into the King's Own Scottish Borderers of the Territorial Army. He served with the 4th Battalion of the regiment in the Battle of France. Between 1942 and 1945 Swan was seconded to the British Indian Army and served with the No. 1 Mule Training Regiment in Jullundu. Following the end of the Second World War, Swan returned to farming in Scotland.

He served as Army Cadet Force County Commandant for Roxburgh, Berwick and Selkirk from 1955 to 1973 and was granted the rank of lieutenant-colonel. He was a colonel in the Lowlands Territorial Army from 1983 to 1986.

== Agriculture ==
Swan was President of the National Farmers Union of Scotland from 1961 to 1962 and was President of the Scottish Agricultural Organisation Society from 1966 to 1968. He was a member of the Development Commission from 1964 to 1976.

== Honours and awards ==
Swan was invested as a Commander of the Order of the British Empire in June 1968, having served as a Deputy Lieutenant in 1965. From 1969 to 1989 he was Lord Lieutenant of Berwickshire and was invested as a Knight Commander of the Royal Victorian Order in June 1988. He was awarded the Efficiency Decoration for long service in the Territorial Army.
