= George Baillie-Hamilton, Lord Binning =

British Army general

Brigadier-General Lord Binning CB MVO DL
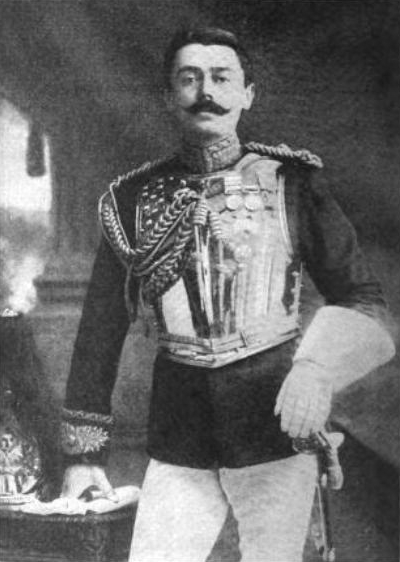
- In The Sketch, 9 January 1901
- Born: 24 December 1856
- Died: 12 January 1917 (aged 60); Tyninghame, Scotland
- Education: Trinity College, Cambridge
- Spouse: Katharine Salting (married 1892)
- Children: 3, including George Baillie-Hamilton, 12th Earl of Haddington
- Military career
- Allegiance: United Kingdom
- Branch: British Army
- Rank: Brigadier-General
- Unit: Royal Horse Guards
- Conflicts: Anglo-Egyptian War; Nile Expedition; Hazara Expedition of 1888; World War I

Brigadier-General George Baillie-Hamilton, Lord Binning, CB, MVO, DL (24 December 1856 – 12 January 1917) was a British Army officer; he was styled "Lord Binning" as a courtesy title.

== Life ==
He was born in 1856, the second child and eldest son of George Baillie-Hamilton-Arden, 11th Earl of Haddington and Helen Katherine, daughter of Sir John Warrender, 5th baronet of Lochend by Frances Arden.

Educated at Eton and Trinity College, Cambridge, he was commissioned in the Royal Horse Guards on 11 September 1880.

=== Military career ===
Baillie-Hamilton served with distinction in the 1882 Anglo-Egyptian War and the Nile Expedition of 1884. In 1889 he was appointed aide-de-camp to the Viceroy of India during the Black Mountain Expedition, being mentioned in despatches. From 1899 to 1903 he was commanding officer of the Royal Horse Guards. As such he was involved in the military arrangements for the Coronation of King Edward VII and Queen Alexandra in August 1902, and three days after the ceremony he was appointed a Member (4th class) of the Royal Victorian Order (MVO) on 12 August 1902, during a private audience with King Edward VII. He retired from the army in 1907, but remained in the Territorial Force as commanding officer of the Lothians and Border Horse, and served as His Majesty's Lieutenant of the County of Berwick from 1901 until he died.

He was appointed a temporary Brigadier-General in December 1915, on receiving command of 41st Brigade in 14th (Light) Division. He remained in command until April 1916, returning to Britain to take charge of the 11th Mounted Brigade.

=== Personal life ===
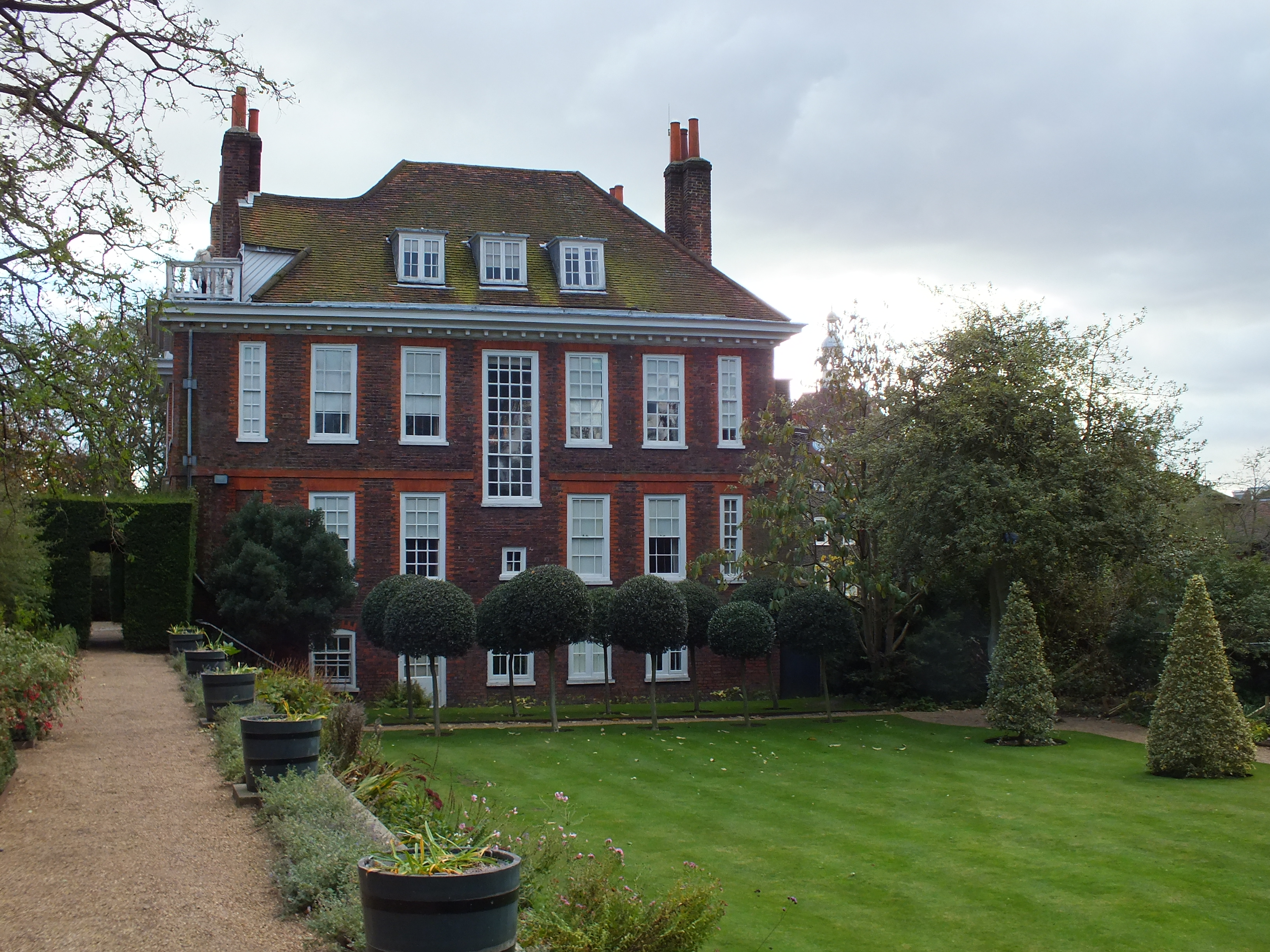
Fenton House, in London

In 1892 he had married Katharine Millicent Salting, only child of Mr. W. S. Salting, with whom he had two sons and a daughter. He died from pneumonia in Tyninghame on 12 January 1917, aged sixty, five months before his father. He thus did not inherit the title and possible election in the House of Lords (as a Scottish Representative Peer) as the Earl of Haddington; instead, it passed to his eldest son, George Baillie-Hamilton. His widow, Lady Binning, donated Fenton House in Hampstead, London to the National Trust on her death in 1952.

Honorary titles
Preceded by The Earl of Lauderdale	Lord Lieutenant of Berwickshire; 1901–1917	Succeeded by Charles Balfour
