= Thomas Hamilton, 6th Earl of Haddington =

Scottish politician (1680–1735)

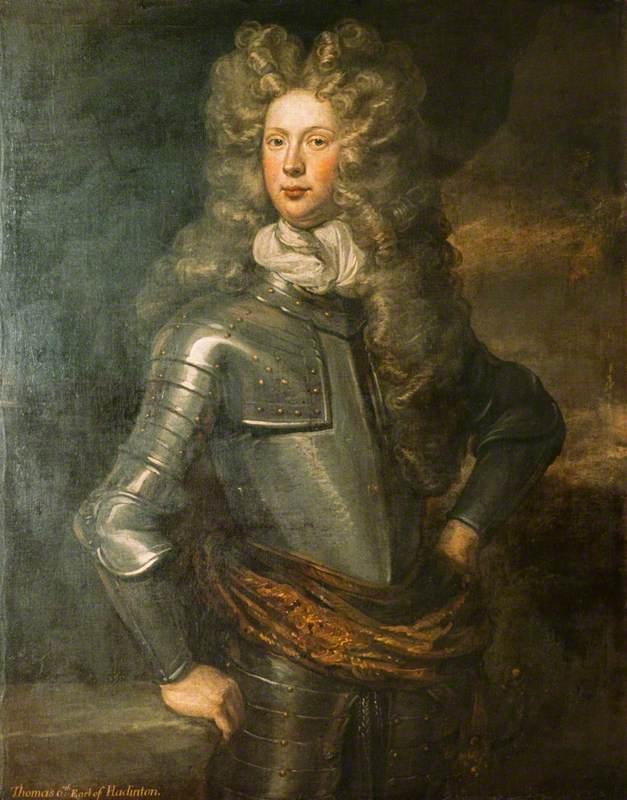
Portrait of Haddington by John Baptist Medina

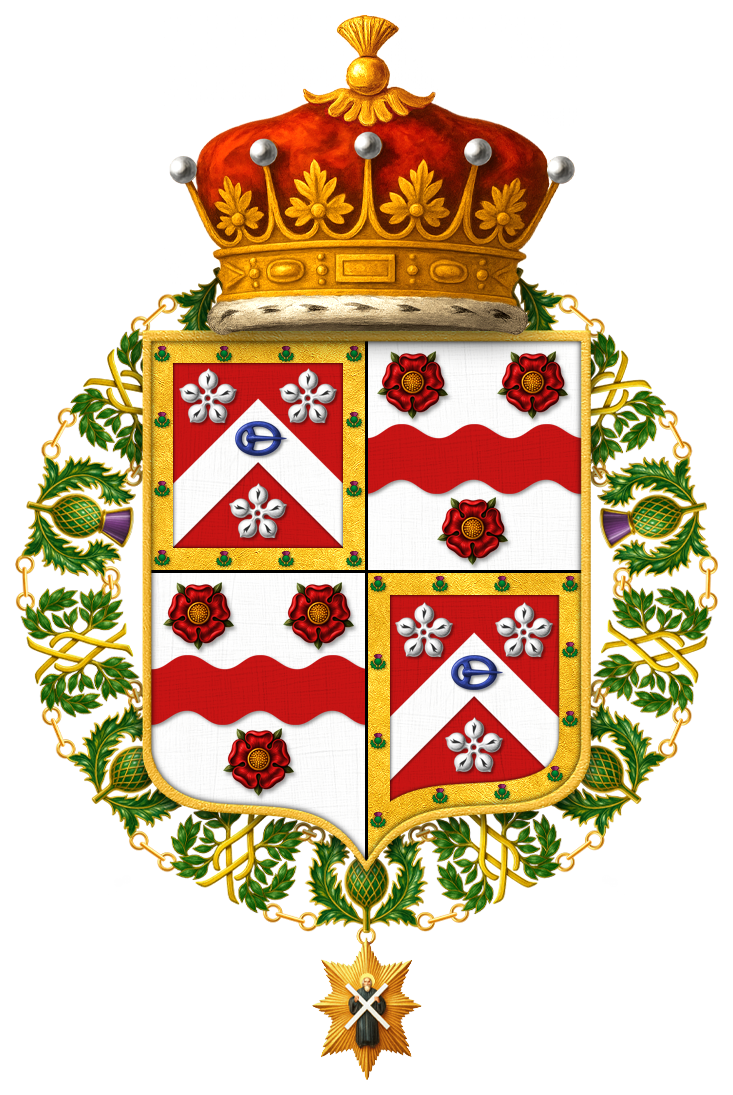
Shield of arms of Thomas Hamilton, 6th Earl of Haddington, KT, FRCPE

Thomas Hamilton, 6th Earl of Haddington, KT, FRCPE (baptised 5 September 1680 – 29 November 1735) was a Scottish politician.

== Life ==
The son of Charles Hamilton, 5th Earl of Haddington and Margaret Leslie, 8th Countess of Rothes, he was christened on 5 September 1680 at Tyninghame House, East Lothian. His elder brother John Hamilton-Leslie, 9th Earl of Rothes succeeded to the Earldom of Rothes in 1700.

He took up residence at the family estate of Tyninghame following his marriage to Helen Hope. They found the estate to be in poor condition and began replanting. His wife is largely responsible for the layout of the parks which survives today, including avenues, plantations, and the 400 acres (160 ha) Binning Wood. The Earl later wrote a book, A Treatise on the Manner of Raising Forest Trees which was published posthumously. An obelisk was erected in the parks in 1856 which commemorated the couple's work.

Haddington was a supporter of the Acts of Union 1707, and further joined with John Campbell, 2nd Duke of Argyll's forces when they met the Jacobites under John Erskine, Earl of Mar at the Battle of Sheriffmuir in 1715. Haddington was wounded and had his horse shot from beneath him.

Installed as Lord Lieutenant of Haddingtonshire in 1716, he was created a Knight of the Thistle in 1717 and sat as a Scottish representative peer from 1716 until 1734.

Lord Haddington died on 29 November 1735 at Newhailes House, Inveresk, and was succeeded by his grandson, Thomas Hamilton, 7th Earl of Haddington.

== Marriage and issue ==
Lord Haddington was married in 1696 to his first cousin Helen Hope, daughter of John Hope of that ilk and Lady Margaret Hamilton, both being grandchildren of John Hamilton, 4th Earl of Haddington. They had issue:

- Charles Hamilton, Lord Binning (1697–1732) predeceased his father.
- Hon. John Hamilton (d.1772)
- Lady Margaret Hamilton (d.1768)
- Lady Christian Hamilton (d.1770) married Sir James Dalrymple, 2nd Baronet mother to David Dalrymple, Lord Hailes

His granddaughter, Margaret Hamilton (daughter of John), married James Buchanan of Drumpellier twice Lord Provost of Glasgow.

Peerage of Scotland
Preceded by Charles Hamilton	Earl of Haddington; 1685–1735	Succeeded by Thomas Hamilton
