= Charles Baillie, Lord Jerviswoode =

Scottish advocate, judge and politician (1804-1879)

Charles Baillie, Lord Jerviswood FRSE (3 November 1804 – 23 July 1879) was a Scottish advocate, judge and politician.

Baillie was the second son of George Baillie of Mellerstain House and Jerviswood (1763–1841), son of the Hon. George Hamilton, younger brother of Thomas Hamilton, 7th Earl of Haddington. His mother was Mary (d. 1865), youngest daughter of Sir James Pringle, 4th Baronet of Stitchill (1726–1809) by his spouse Elizabeth (1784–1826), daughter of Norman MacLeod of that Ilk, 19th Chief of MacLeod. He was born at Mellerstain House.

Elected to the Faculty of Advocates in 1830, he was an advocate depute from 1844 to 1846 and in 1852. He was sheriff of Stirlingshire from 1853 to 1858, Solicitor General for Scotland in 1858, and Lord Advocate from 1858 to 1859. He was elected as member of parliament for Linlithgowshire in 1859. He was raised to rank and precedence of an earl's son and raised to the bench as a judge of the Court of Session in 1859, taking the judicial title Lord Jerviswood. He was appointed a Lord of Justiciary in 1862. He retired in 1874.

Charles Baillie married, on 27 December 1831, the Hon. Anne (d.1880), third daughter of Hugh Scott of Harden (1758–1841) whose claim as Lord Polwarth, in the Peerage of Scotland, was admitted by the House of Lords in July 1835. They left children.

He died at Dryburgh House and is buried in the family vault at Mellerstain House.

== Arms ==
Coat of arms of Charles Baillie, Lord Jerviswoode

Crest
A crescent Or.
Escutcheon
Sable a sun Or between nine stars Argent three two and one.
Motto
Major Virtus Quam Splendor

== See also ==
- Earl of Haddington

Parliament of the United Kingdom
Preceded by George Dundas	Member of Parliament for Linlithgowshire; 1859	Succeeded by Walter Ferrier Hamilton
Legal offices
Preceded by John Inglis	Lord Advocate; 1858–1859	Succeeded by David Mure
