= Lord Lieutenant of Berwickshire =

Ceremonial officer in Berwickshire, Scotland

This is a list of people who have served as lord-lieutenant for Berwickshire.

== List of officeholders ==
- Alexander Home, 10th Earl of Home 17 March 1794 – 20 October 1841
- James Maitland, 9th Earl of Lauderdale 2 November 1841 – 22 August 1860
- David Robertson, 1st Baron Marjoribanks 10 December 1860 – 19 June 1873
- James Innes-Ker, 6th Duke of Roxburghe 9 July 1873 – 23 April 1879
- Charles Douglas-Home, 12th Earl of Home 20 June 1879 – 1890
- Frederick Maitland, 13th Earl of Lauderdale 4 March 1890 – 1901
- Brigadier-General George Baillie-Hamilton, Lord Binning 5 January 1901 – 12 January 1917
- Captain Charles Balfour 30 May 1917 – 31 August 1921
- Colonel Charles Hope 23 January 1922 – 25 August 1930
- Charles Douglas-Home, 13th Earl of Home 8 December 1930 – 11 July 1951
- George Baillie-Hamilton, 12th Earl of Haddington 11 January 1952 – 1969
- Lieutenant-Colonel Sir William Bertram Swan 13 October 1969 – 1989
- Major-General Sir John Swinton of Kimmerghame 10 October 1989 – 2000
- Alexander Richard Trotter 20 September 2000 – 20 February 2014
- Jeanna Swan 25 April 2014 – present

== Deputy lieutenant of Berwickshire ==
A deputy lieutenant of Berwickshire is commissioned by the Lord Lieutenant of Berwickshire. Deputy lieutenants support the work of the lord-lieutenant. There can be several deputy lieutenants at any time, depending on the population of the county. Their appointment does not terminate with the changing of the lord-lieutenant, but they usually retire at age 75.

- 22 May 2006: Joy Dobie
- 22 May 2006: Susan Swan
