= Charles Douglas-Home, 13th Earl of Home =

British peer and banker (1873–1951)

The Right Honourable Earl of Home KT TD
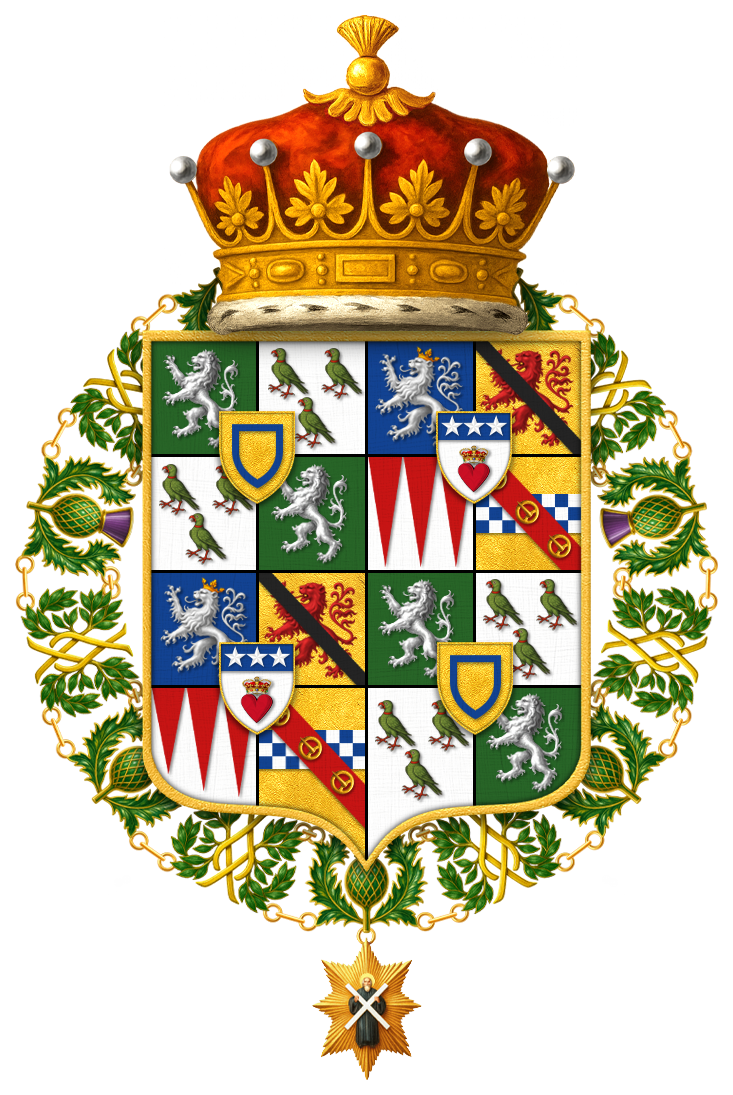

Member of the House of Lords Lord Temporal
- In office 30 April 1918 – 11 July 1951; Hereditary peerage
- Preceded by: Charles Douglas-Home, 12th Earl of Home
- Succeeded by: Alec Douglas-Home

Personal details
- Born: Charles Cospatrick Archibald Douglas-Home; 29 December 1873 London, England
- Died: 11 July 1951 (aged 77) The Hirsel, near Coldstream, Berwickshire, Scotland
- Spouse: Lady Lillian Lambton (m. 1902)
- Children: 7, including Alec and William
- Occupation: Banker

Charles Cospatrick Archibald Douglas-Home, 13th Earl of Home, KT, TD (29 December 1873 – 11 July 1951), styled Lord Dunglass between 1881 and 1918, was a British peer and banker. He served as Lord Lieutenant of Berwickshire from 1930 until 1951 and was the father of the British prime minister Alec Douglas-Home.

== Life and career ==
He was born on 29 December 1873, the only son of Charles Douglas-Home, 12th Earl of Home, and Maria Grey, the daughter of Captain Charles Conrad Grey, RN (and great-niece of Charles, 2nd Earl Grey). Styled Lord Dunglass, he was educated at Eton College and at Christ Church, Oxford. He subsequently served as an officer in the 3rd and 4th Battalions, the Cameronians and as Colonel in the Lanarkshire Yeomanry and was awarded the Territorial Decoration. He fought in the First World War, where he took part in the Gallipoli Campaign and was mentioned in dispatches. He succeeded to his father's earldom and subsidiary titles on 30 April 1918. He was the Governor of the British Linen Bank from 1930 to 1947. He held the office of Justice of the Peace for Glasgow and Berwickshire, and was a Captain of the Royal Company of Archers. He was invested as a Knight of the Order of the Thistle in 1930. He held the office of Lord Lieutenant of Berwickshire from 1930 until his death. He was awarded the honorary degree of Doctor of Law by the University of Glasgow. He died at his home The Hirsel on 11 July 1951.

== Estates ==
In 1918, he inherited extensive property and estates from his father, including Douglas Castle, Bothwell Castle, The Hirsel and lands (which totalled some 107,000 acres in 1878) chiefly in Lanarkshire, Roxburghshire and Berwickshire. The following year, he was forced to sell many historic pictures and art treasures from the family collection to settle death duties. Many of the portraits had come from the famous collection of the Earl of Clarendon inherited through Lady Catherine Hyde, daughter of the 4th Earl of Clarendon and wife of the 3rd Duke of Queensberry, and the English and foreign silver was considered to be one of the most important collections to come into the market for some years.

== Marriage and children ==
On 14 July 1902 at St Margaret's, Westminster, he married Lady Lillian Lambton (8 December 1881 – 26 September 1966), daughter of Frederick Lambton, 4th Earl of Durham. The marriage is held to have been a happy one, and the couple had seven children:

- Alec Douglas-Home (1903–1995), Prime Minister of the United Kingdom (1963–1964);
- Lady Bridget Douglas-Home (4 May 1905 – 1980);
- Henry Montagu Douglas-Home (1907–1980), married three times. Firstly, Lady Margaret Spencer, daughter of the 6th Earl Spencer) and had issue, namely the journalist Charles Douglas-Home and the musician and author Robin Douglas-Home; secondly, Vera Johanson and had issue; thirdly, Felicity Jonsson and had issue;
- Lady Rachel Douglas-Home (10 April 1910 – 4 April 1996), married Lord William Montagu Douglas Scott and had issue;
- William Douglas Home (1912–1992), married Rachel Douglas-Home, 27th Baroness Dacre and had issue;
- Edward Charles Douglas-Home (1 March 1920 – 17 February 2006), married Nancy Straker-Smith and had issue; and
- George Cospatrick Douglas-Home (1922 – 14 June 1943), killed on active service as a Pilot Officer in the RAF, unmarried.

Honorary titles
Preceded by Charles Hope	Lord Lieutenant of Berwickshire; 1930–1951	Succeeded by The Earl of Haddington
Peerage of Scotland
Preceded by Charles Douglas-Home	Earl of Home; 1918–1951	Succeeded by Alexander Douglas-Home (disclaimed in 1963)
