= Tyninghame House =

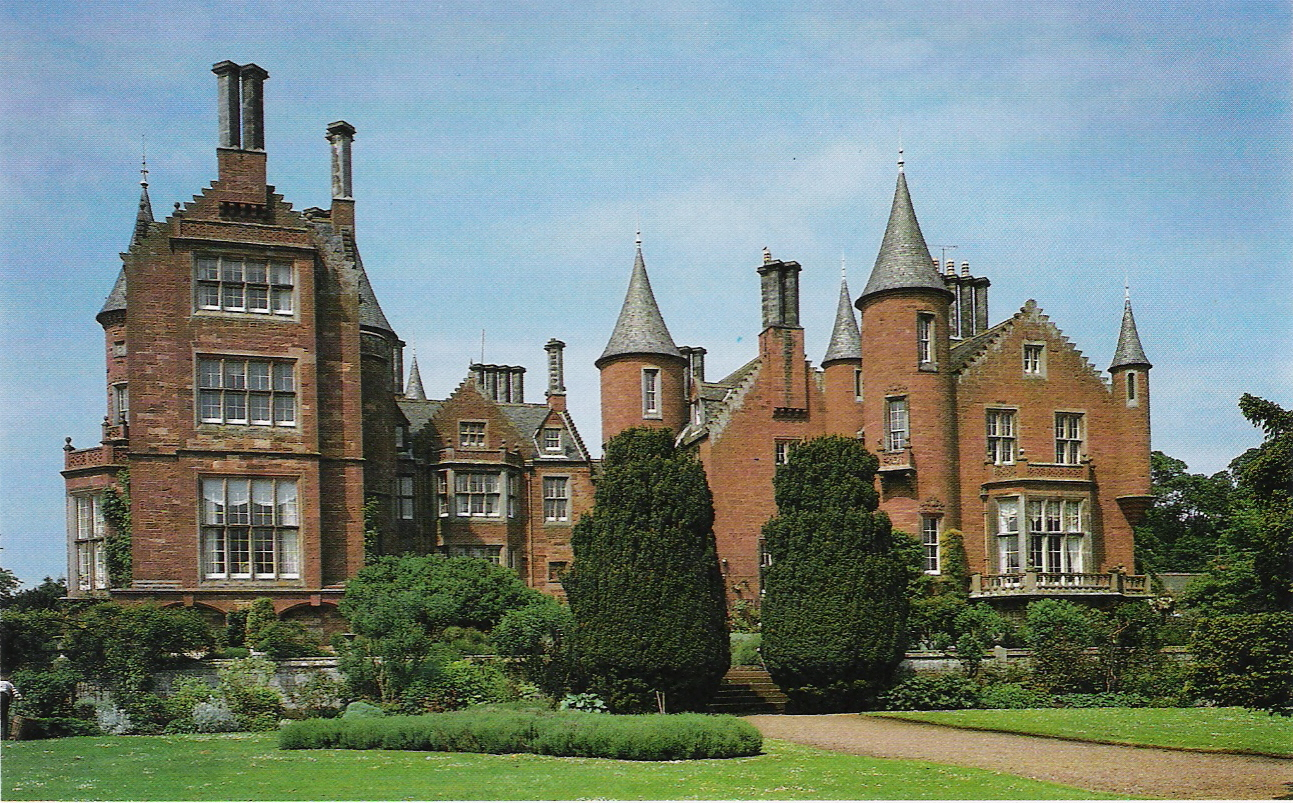
- Tyninghame House

- Location of Tyninghame House in East Lothian
- 56°00′36″N 2°36′44″W

Listed Building – Category A
- Designated: 5 February 1971
- Reference no.: LB14586

Inventory of Gardens and Designed Landscapes in Scotland
- Official name: Tyninghame
- Designated: 30 June 1987
- Reference no.: GDL00380

Tyninghame House is a mansion in East Lothian, Scotland. It is located by the mouth of the River Tyne, 2/3-mile (1.1 km) east of Tyninghame, and 3 3/4 miles (6.0 km) west of Dunbar. There was a manor at Tyninghame in 1094, and it was later a property of the Lauder of The Bass family. In the 17th century, it was sold to the Earl of Haddington. The present building dates from 1829 when the 9th Earl of Haddington employed William Burn to greatly enlarge the house in the Baronial style. In 1987 the contents of the house were sold, and the house was divided into flats.

The house is protected as a category A listed building, and the grounds are included in the Inventory of Gardens and Designed Landscapes in Scotland, the national listing of significant gardens.

== History ==
There was a manor on the lands in 1094, when it was mentioned in a charter of Duncan II of Scotland to the monks of St Cuthberts. From 1250 into the 16th century Tyninghame was held by the Bishops of St Andrews. It was leased to the Lauder family as a winter residence. The Lauders owned The Bass and lived there in the summer. In 1617 the Dowager Lady Bass, Isabella Hepburn (widow of George Lauder of The Bass (died 1611)) made additions to the house. She sold the house and estate to the courtier John Murray, 1st Earl of Annandale in 1621 for 200,000 merks.

=== Earls of Haddington ===
In 1628 when Thomas Hamilton, 1st Earl of Haddington received that title in exchange for that of Earl of Melrose he acquired Tyninghame by purchase. He gave the house and furnishings to his son in 1635, and an inventory was made of the contents. The building then comprised an old tower with newer wings or "jambs" over vaulted cellars. Thomas Hamilton, 2nd Earl of Haddington was killed in an explosion at Dunglass Castle in 1640, and by 1669 the 5th Earl had inherited the property. He married Margaret Leslie, 8th Countess of Rothes, daughter of the Duke of Rothes, and lived mainly on his wife's estate. His son, the 6th Earl, took up residence at Tyninghame following his marriage to Helen Hope around 1700. The couple found the estate in poor condition and set about renovating and replanting. His wife is largely responsible for the layout of the parks which survives today, including avenues, plantations, and the 400 acres (160 ha) Binning Wood. She named the wood after their son. Inspired by his wife to become a noted agricultural improver, the Earl wrote a book, A Treatise on the Manner of Raising Forest Trees, published in 1761.

In 1791 Charles, the 8th Earl, renovated the house, but these were superseded by the works carried out by the 9th Earl. In 1828 he commissioned William Burn to redesign the house in the Scots Baronial style. Burn made only limited alterations to the plan of the house but totally altered the elevations, refacing most of the building in red sandstone, and adding turrets and other details. The original 17th-century masonry can be seen on the south facade. The 9th Earl also carried out further plantings in the parks and erected an obelisk in 1856 to commemorate the work of the 5th Earl.

On the death of the 9th Earl in 1858, the estate was inherited by a cousin, George Baillie of Mellerstain. His son, the 11th Earl, carried out further plantings in the 1880s, including the Walled Gardens. Formal gardens, including Lady Haddington's Secret Garden, were established by the 12th Earl and his wife in the 20th century. The house was featured in Country Life on 7 August 1975, and in Scottish Field in August 1953. After the 12th Earl died in 1986, the 13th Earl chose to retain Mellerstain House near Duns, Berwickshire as his main residence, and Tyninghame was sold the following year. The bulk of the contents were auctioned by Sotheby's in a two-day sale at the house, on 28–29 September 1987. The house was then divided into apartments by country house developer Kit Martin.
