= Thomas Hamilton, 7th Earl of Haddington =

Scottish nobleman

Coat of arms of the Earls of Haddington before 1858.

Thomas Hamilton, 7th Earl of Haddington (1721 – 19 May 1794) was a Scottish nobleman.

== Life ==
Thomas Hamilton was the son of Charles Hamilton, Lord Binning and Rachel Baillie of Mellerstain and Jerviswood. Lord Binning had predeceased his father Thomas Hamilton, 6th Earl of Haddington in 1732, and from then until 1735 when his grandfather died Hamilton was known as Lord Binning, and thereafter as Lord Haddington.

Haddington matriculated at St Mary Hall, Oxford on 30 April 1737 and travelled widely on the continent, residing at Rome and later Geneva, where he became part of what was known as the "Common room" involving Benjamin Stillingfleet amongst others.

Haddington returned to Scotland by 1744 but did not greatly participate in public life. He died at Ham, London on 19 May 1794. He was succeeded by his son Charles Hamilton, 8th Earl of Haddington

== Marriage and issue ==
Lord Haddington married twice. Firstly on 28 October 1750 to Mary Lloyd (d. 1785), widow of Gresham Lloyd and daughter to Rowland Holt of Redgrave Hall, Suffolk. Mary Lloyd had a daughter, also Mary, who would wed John Leslie, 10th Earl of Rothes, Haddington's father's first cousin. By Mary Lloyd he had issue:

- Charles Hamilton, 8th Earl of Haddington
- Hon. Thomas Hamilton (1758–1774)

Haddington married secondly to Anne Gascoigne, daughter to Sir Charles Gascoigne and had issue:

- Lady Charlotte Hamilton (1790–1793)

Peerage of Scotland
Preceded by Thomas Hamilton	Earl of Haddington; 1735–1794	Succeeded by Charles Hamilton
