= George Baillie-Hamilton-Arden, 11th Earl of Haddington =

Scottish landowner, politician and peer

The Right Honourable The Earl of Haddington
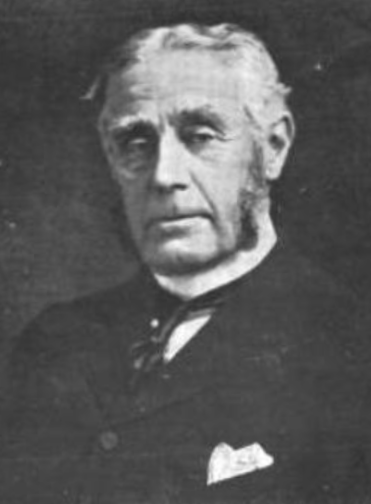
- Born: 26 July 1827
- Died: 11 June 1917 (aged 89)
- Occupations: Landowner, peer
- Spouse: Helen Katharine Warrender (m. 1854)
- Children: George Baillie-Hamilton, Lord Binning

George Baillie-Hamilton-Arden, 11th Earl of Haddington, KT, DL, FRSE (26 July 1827 – 11 June 1917), was a Scottish landowner and Scottish representative peer.

== Life ==
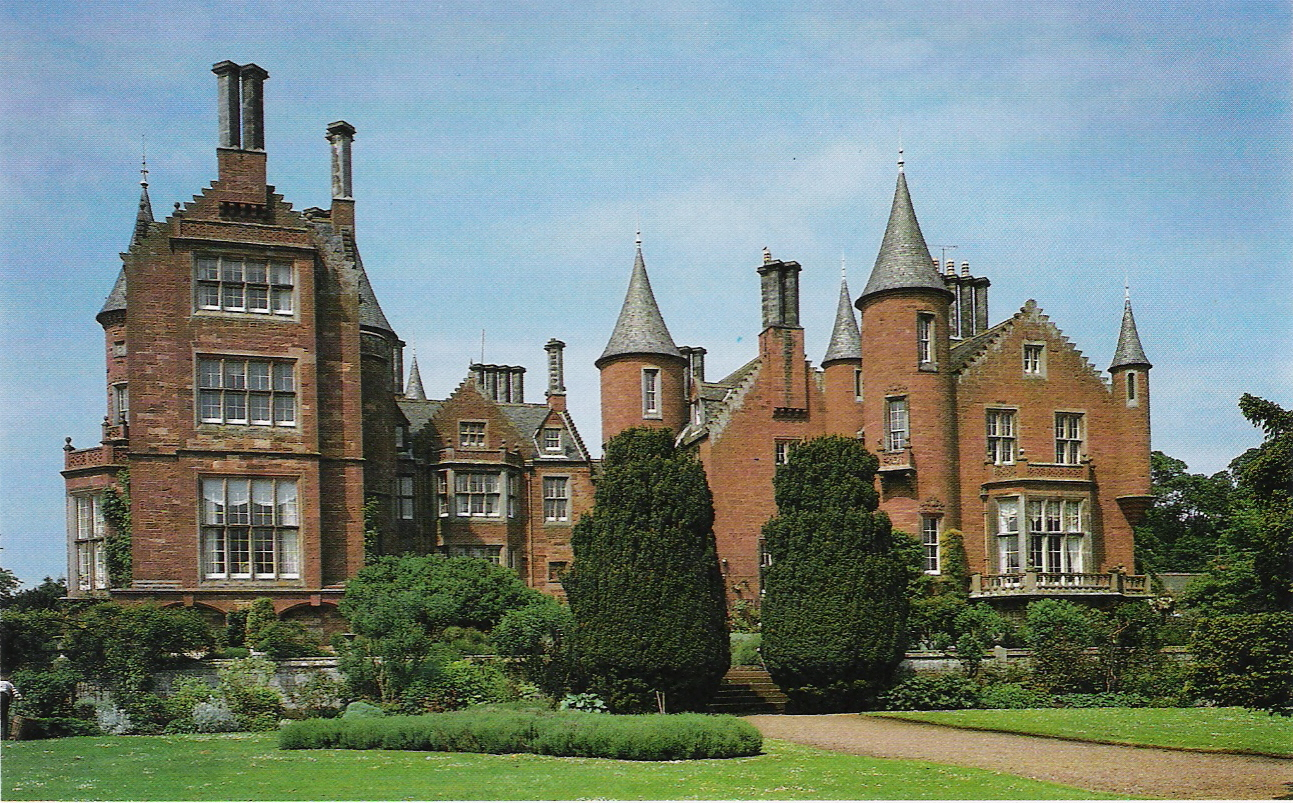
Tyninghame House

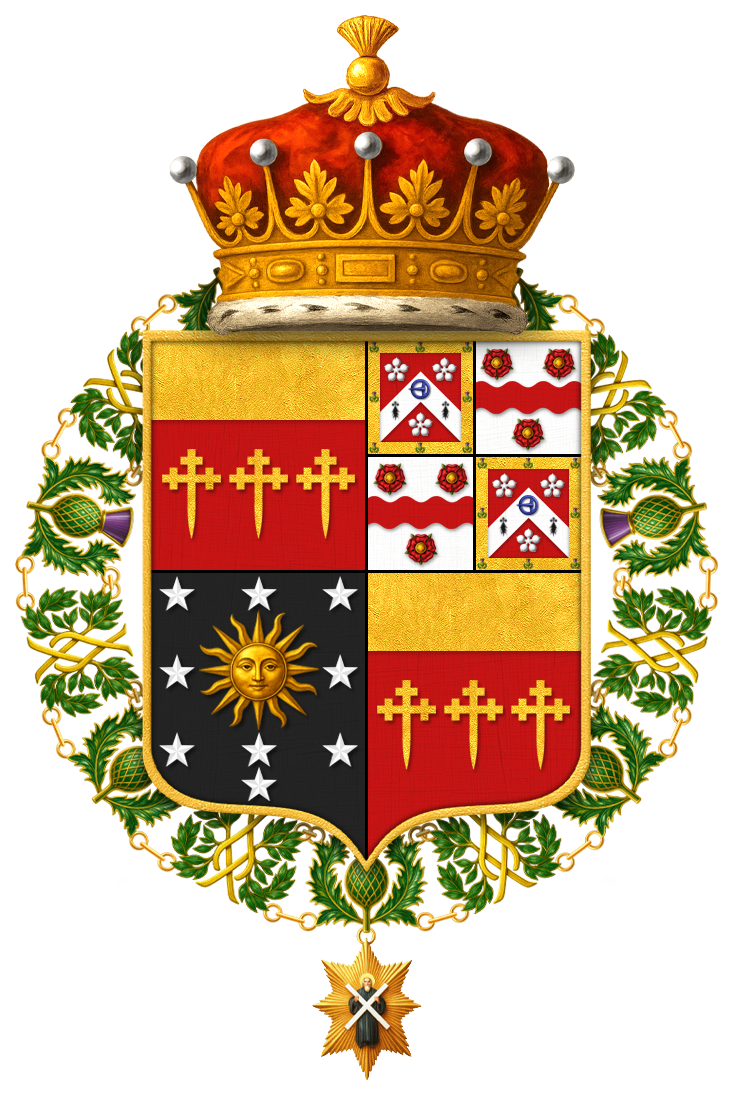
Shield of Arms of George Baillie-Hamilton-Arden, 11th Earl of Haddington, KT, DL, FRSE

Lord Haddington was the son of George Baillie-Hamilton, 10th Earl of Haddington, and Georgina Markham.

Lord Haddington was elected a Scottish representative peer from 1874 until his death. He was High Sheriff of Cheshire in 1871. He was created Lord Lieutenant of Haddingtonshire in 1874. He was honorary Colonel of the Lothians and Border Horse and an officer in the Royal Company of Archers.

In 1886, he was elected a Fellow of the Royal Society of Edinburgh. His proposers were Sir Thomas Grainger Stewart, Robert Grey, Sir William Turner, and Peter Guthrie Tait. He resigned from the Society in 1892.

Lord Haddington was appointed a Knight of the Order of the Thistle (KT) in the 1902 Coronation Honours list published on 26 June 1902, and was invested by King Edward VII at Buckingham Palace on 8 August 1902.

He lived at Tyninghame House near Prestonkirk in East Lothian.

Lord Haddington was a leading Scottish Freemason. He was the Grand Master of the Grand Lodge of Scotland from 1892 to 1893 and the Grand Master of the Royal Order of Scotland from 1891 to 1917.

== Marriage and issue ==
On 17 October 1854, he married Helen Katharine Warrender (1834–1889). The marriage produced seven children:

- Isabel Baillie-Hamilton (d. 1859)
- Lady Ruth Baillie-Hamilton (1855–1941)
- George Baillie-Hamilton, Lord Binning (1856–1917)
- Lt. Hon. Richard Baillie-Hamilton (1858–1881)
- Lady Grisell Baillie-Hamilton (1861–1957)
- Captain Hon. Henry Robert Baillie-Hamilton-Arden (1862–1949)
- Lady Cecely Baillie-Hamilton (1868–1950)

His eldest son George predeceased him by a few months, dying in January 1917, and so the title passed to his grandson George Baillie-Hamilton, 12th Earl of Haddington.

Masonic offices
Preceded by The Lord Blythswood	Grand Master of the Grand Lodge of Scotland; 1892–1893	Succeeded by Charles Dalrymple
Honorary titles
Preceded by The Marquess of Tweedale	Lord Lieutenant of East Lothian; 1876–1917	Succeeded by The Earl of Wemyss
Peerage of Scotland
Preceded by George Baillie-Hamilton	Earl of Haddington; 1870–1917	Succeeded by George Baillie-Hamilton
