= Thomas Hamilton, 9th Earl of Haddington =

Scottish statesman

The Right Honourable The Earl of Haddington KT PC FRS FRSE
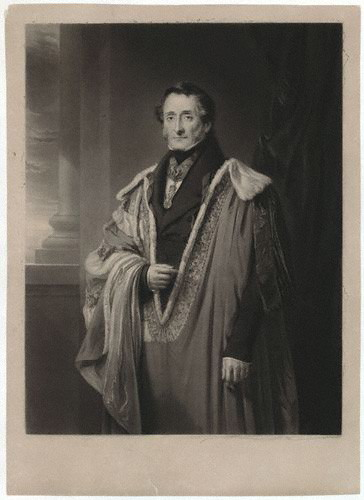

Lord Lieutenant of Ireland
- In office 1 January 1835 – 8 April 1835
- Monarch: William IV
- Prime Minister: Sir Robert Peel, Bt
- Preceded by: The Marquess Wellesley
- Succeeded by: The Earl of Mulgrave

First Lord of the Admiralty
- In office 6 September 1841 – 8 January 1846
- Monarch: Victoria
- Prime Minister: Sir Robert Peel, Bt
- Preceded by: The Earl of Minto
- Succeeded by: The Earl of Ellenborough

Personal details
- Born: 21 June 1780
- Died: 1 December 1858 (aged 78)
- Party: Tory
- Spouse: Lady Maria Parker (d. 1861)
- Education: University of Edinburgh; Christ Church, Oxford

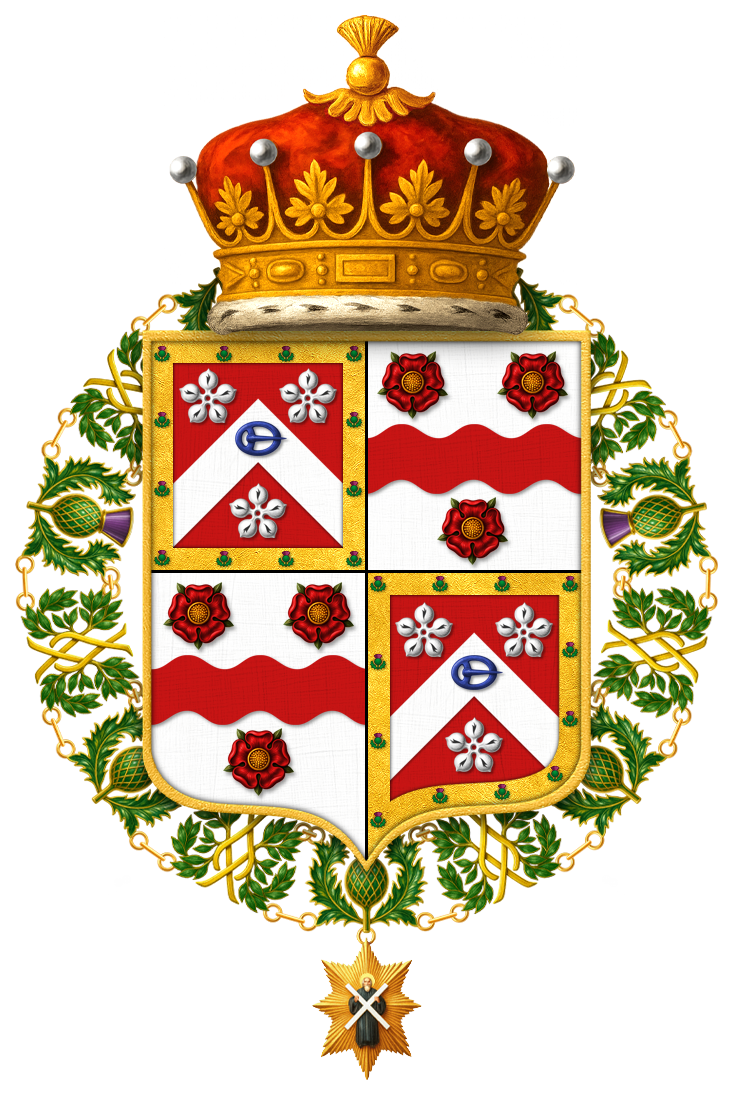
Shield of Arms of Thomas Hamilton, 9th Earl of Haddington, KT, PC, FRS, FRSE

Thomas Hamilton, 9th Earl of Haddington, KT, PC, FRS, FRSE (21 June 1780 – 1 December 1858), known as Lord Binning from 1794 to 1828, was a Scottish Conservative statesman.

== Background and education ==
Lord Haddington was the only son of Lady Sophia, daughter of John Hope, 2nd Earl of Hopetoun, and Charles Hamilton, 8th Earl of Haddington. He was educated at the University of Edinburgh and Christ Church, Oxford.

== Political career ==
At the beginning of the 19th century, Lord Haddington was a supporter of George Canning. He was elected as a Member of Parliament for St Germans in 1802, but did not stand for re-election in 1806. In August 1814, he was appointed one of His Majesty's Commissioners for the management of the affairs in India. He served sporadically in the House of Commons until 1827 when he was elevated to the House of Lords by the new prime minister, George Canning, who had him created Baron Melrose, of Tynninghame in the County of Haddington, in the Peerage of the United Kingdom. He had previously been created a privy counsellor in 1814, and, in 1828, he succeeded to his family's Scottish earldom.

Lord Haddington went on to vote against the Reform Bill in 1831, but later changed his mind and voted for it in 1832, possibly due to the political crises surrounding its passage. Upon the rise of Sir Robert Peel to the premiership in 1834, Lord Haddington was made Lord Lieutenant of Ireland, however the government collapsed within six months, and the Whigs were once again in power. Lord Haddington was able to return to government in 1841 with the return of Sir Robert Peel to the premiership - he declined the post of Governor General of India, instead opting to become First Lord of the Admiralty and a member of the Cabinet. He held that post until January 1846, when he was shuffled to become Lord Privy Seal, a post he held until the death of the government in July.

Lord Binning's family were related to the Stanhopes and staunch supporters of Pitt's administration. Being, as the eldest son of a Scots peer, ineligible for a seat in Scotland, he was provided with an English seat in 1802 'under the peculiar protection of Mr Pitt', by Pitt's sister's father-in-law, Lord Eliot.

As might have been expected, Binning followed Pitt's line in his first Parliament, voting with him for the orders of the day, 3 June 1803, against Addington, 7 March, 13 and 16 April. (though on 15 March he did not divide on Pitt's motion on the navy) and also for Fox's and Pitt's defence motions which brought down Addington, 23 and 25 April 1804. He went on to support Pitt's second administration and voted against the censure of Melville, 8 Apr. 1805. He was on the committee which investigated the 11th naval report. After Pitt's death he was one of the Pittite group led by Canning, Sturges Bourne and George Rose which held fortnightly dinners at White's, and became a steward of the Pitt Club. He voted against the Grenville ministry on Ellenborough's seat in the cabinet, 3 March 1806, and against the repeal of Pitt's Additional Force Act, 30 April. On 26 June, he asked why Scotland was excluded from the training bill; on 3 July, when he was teller against the bill, he was put down by the lord advocate who asked him why he wished to extend to Scotland a bill that his fellow oppositionists had been abusing for weeks; but promised to bring in a separate bill for Scotland.

Binning found no seat in 1806, though his friend Huskisson reported that he wished Binning's father had allowed him to contest Dover, where he might have got in at modest expense. Melville secured an opening for him from Viscount Lowther on a vacancy at Cockermouth in January 1807: Melville had suggested that Binning might come in for Haslemere on the same interest instead of Viscount Garlies, when the latter succeeded to the title in November 1806, but Binning had to wait for the next vacancy. Cockermouth was only available to him for another year, so at the general election of 1807, he found another seat on Lord Clinton's interest at Callington, through their mutual uncle Francis Drake.

In 1831 he was stripped of his hereditary title of Keeper of the Royal Park (Holyrood Park) due to the outrageous behaviour of his father in quarrying in the park. However, Thomas received £40,000 in compensation (the equivalent of £4.5 million in 2022).

== Family ==
Lord Haddington married Lady Maria Parker, heir of George Parker, 4th Earl of Macclesfield, in 1802. They had no surviving children and the Earl died in December 1858, aged 78. On his death the barony of Melrose became extinct while he was succeeded in the remaining titles by his second cousin, George Baillie-Hamilton. Lady Haddington died in 1861.

In 1828 he commissioned William Burn to remodel the family seat of Tyninghame House, which passed with the earldom to Baillie-Hamilton.

== Notes ==
Parliament of the United Kingdom
Preceded by Lord Grey; Hon. William Eliot	Member of Parliament for St Germans; 1802–1806; With: James Langham	Succeeded by Sir Joseph Yorke; Matthew Montagu
Preceded by James Graham; John Lowther	Member of Parliament for Cockermouth; 1807; With: James Graham	Succeeded by James Graham; John Lowther
Preceded by William Wickham; William Garrow	Member of Parliament for Callington; 1807–1812; With: Thomas Carter 1807–1810; William Stephen Poyntz 1810–1812	Succeeded by William Stephen Poyntz; Sir John Rogers, Bt
Preceded by Charles Trelawny-Brereton; Hon. Edward Law	Member of Parliament for Mitchell (or St Michael's); 1814–1818; With: Hon. Edward Law	Succeeded by Sir George Staunton, Bt; William Leake
Preceded by James Barnett; Sir Thomas Thompson, Bt	Member of Parliament for Rochester; 1818–1826; With: James Barnett 1818–1820; Ralph Bernal 1820–1826	Succeeded by Ralph Bernal; Henry Dundas
Preceded by Sir Peter Pole, Bt; Theodore Broadhead	Member of Parliament for Yarmouth (Isle of Wight); 1826–1827; With: Joseph Phillimore	Succeeded by Joseph Phillimore; Thomas Wallace
Political offices
Preceded by The Marquess Wellesley	Lord Lieutenant of Ireland; 1834–1835	Succeeded by The Earl of Mulgrave
Preceded by The Earl of Minto	First Lord of the Admiralty; 1841–1846	Succeeded by The Earl of Ellenborough
Preceded by The Duke of Buccleuch	Lord Privy Seal; 1846	Succeeded by The Earl of Minto
Peerage of Scotland
Preceded by Charles Hamilton	Earl of Haddington; 1828–1858	Succeeded by George Baillie-Hamilton
Peerage of the United Kingdom
New creation	Baron Melros; 1827–1858	Extinct
