= Auldhame Castle =

Castle in East Lothian, Scotland

Coordinates: 56.0528°N 2.6401°W

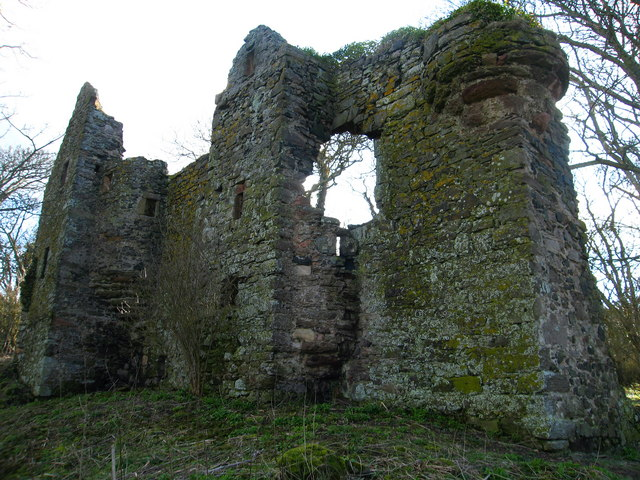
Ruins of Auldhame Castle

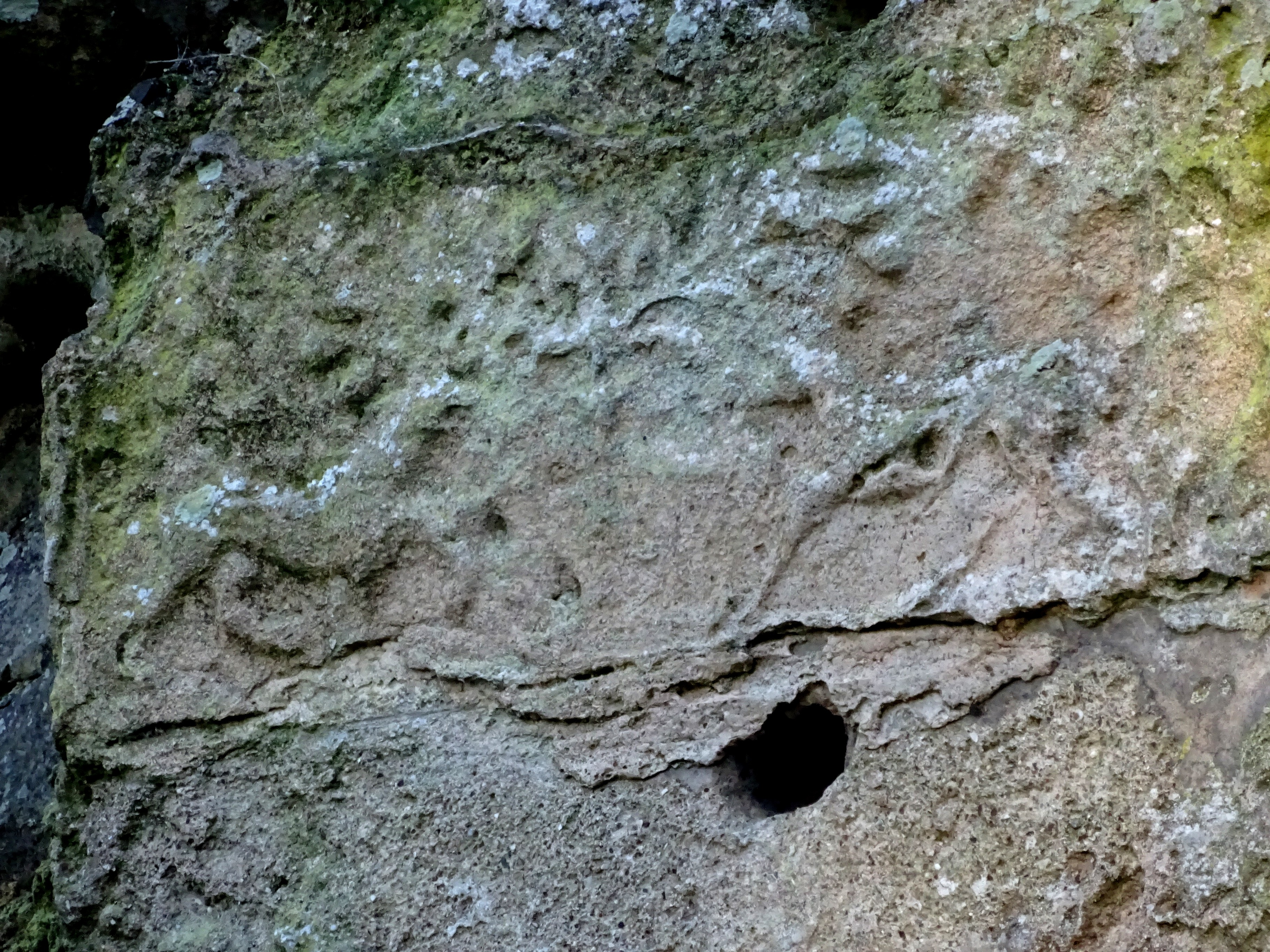
Plaster freize depicting animals and a tree, Auldhame Castle

Auldhame Castle is a ruined L-plan tower house standing on a ridge above Seacliff beach, about 3 miles east of North Berwick in East Lothian, and less than half a mile from Tantallon Castle.

== Description ==
The castle was built in the 16th century, probably by Adam Otterburn of Reidhall, Lord Provost of Edinburgh. It consists of a three-storey main block with a projecting stair-tower. Part of a vaulted basement kitchen remains, with a bread oven. The upper floors are mostly gone. Some plaster remains on the walls, including traces of a moulded decorative frieze.

== Archaeological excavation ==
One of the three supposed corpses of Saint Baldred of Tyninghame was said to have been buried at the site in 756. A cemetery site in an adjoining field was excavated in 2008, the remains of at least 326 individual skeletons were noted, plus the foundations of a probable chapel with an estimated 9th century date (based on comparisons with similar structures).

== See also ==
- List of castles in Scotland
- Auldhame & Scoughall
