= Eliza Hayward =

Eliza Hayward may refer to:

- Eliza Hayward (SP-1414), a sloop that served with the U.S. Navy 1917–1918
- Eliza Hayward, a brig that wrecked 7 January 1846
- Eliza Hayward, a ship destroyed by fire in September 1863
- Eliza Hayward (1825–1902), mother of Henry Thomas Pringuer

== See also ==
- Hayward (disambiguation)
  - Hayward (surname)
- Eliza (given name)
- Mary Eliza Hayward (1842–1938)
