= James Wallace (moderator) =

Church of Scotland minister

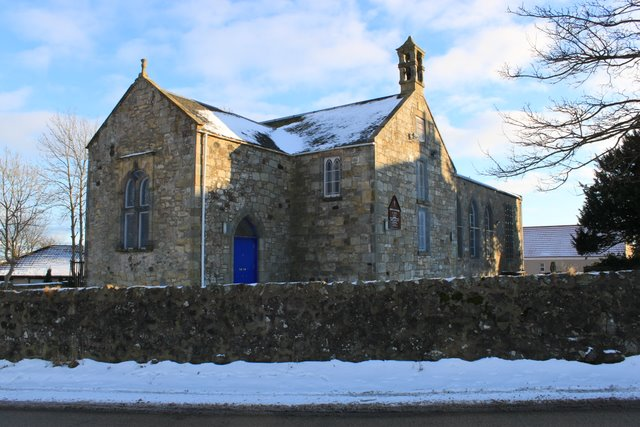
Ballingry Parish Church

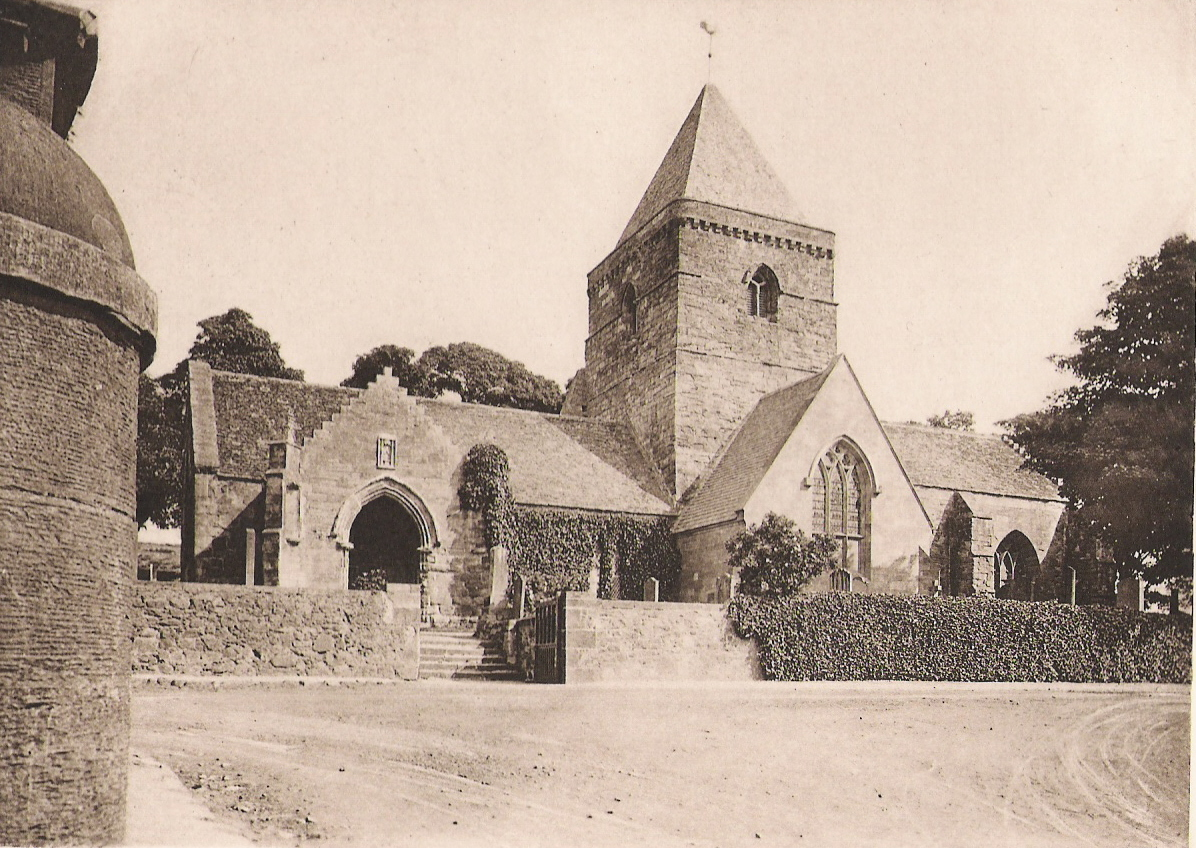
The White Kirk in the 19th century

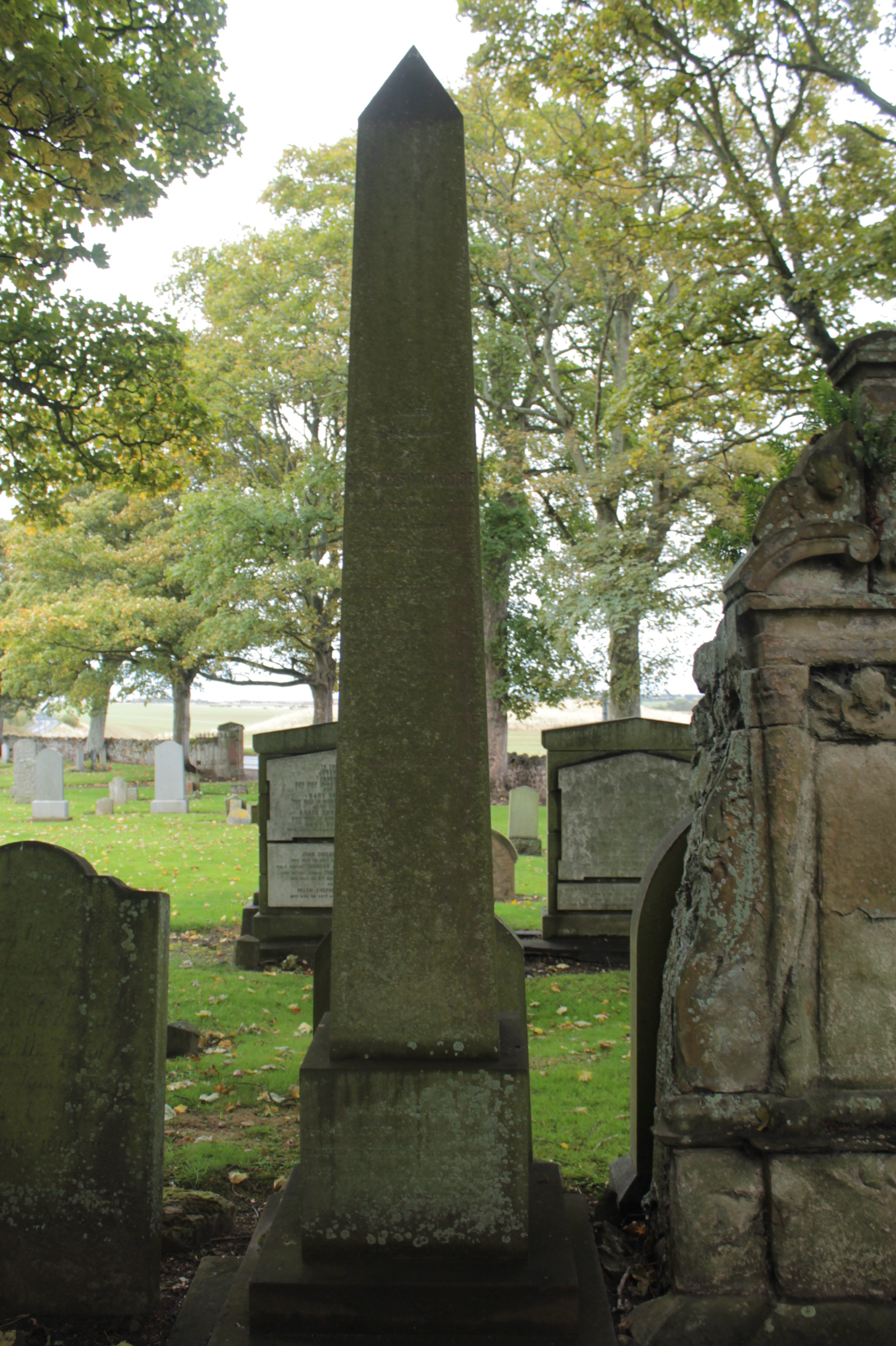
The grave of Very Rev James Wallace, Whitekirk graveyard

James Wallace (1770–1852) was a minister of the Church of Scotland who served as Moderator of the General Assembly in 1831, the highest position in the Scottish church.

== Life ==
He was born in Dumfriesshire on 1770. He was licensed to preach by the Presbytery of Edinburgh in 1795.

In April 1802 he was ordained as minister of Ballingry in Fife. In November 1806, under the patronsage of Charles Hamilton, 8th Earl of Haddington he was translated to Whitekirk in East Lothian. In 1825 the University of Edinburgh awarded him an honorary Doctor of Divinity (DD).

During his ministry (1830-2) he organised the remodelling of the transepts of the church.

In 1831 he succeeded Rev William Singer as Moderator of the General Assembly of the Church of Scotland the highest position in the Scottish Church. He was succeeded in turn by the Rev Thomas Chalmers.

He died in Whitekirk manse on 11 November 1852 and is buried in the graveyard of his church.

The grave lies east of the church and is marked by an obelisk. The inscription is eroding.

== Publications ==
- An Account of the Parish of Whitekirk and Tyninghame (1845)
