= List of shipwrecks in January 1846 =

The list of shipwrecks in January 1846 includes ships sunk, foundered, wrecked, grounded, or otherwise lost during January 1846.

== 1 January ==
List of shipwrecks: 1 January 1846
Ship	State	Description
Comet	United Kingdom	The ship foundered in the North Sea off the Cockle Sand. Her crew were rescued by the St. Nicholas Lightship ( Trinity House). She was on a voyage from Hull, Yorkshire to Plymouth, Devon.
Fanny	United Kingdom	The ship was driven ashore and wrecked at "Newton", Glamorgan. She was on a voyage from Southampton, Hampshire to Porthcawl, Glamorgan. She was refloated on 14 January and taken in to Porthcawl.
Freundschaft	Denmark	The ship was driven ashore on the coast of Jutland. she was on a voyage from Stubbekøbing to London, United Kingdom. She was refloated and put in to Tönning, Duchy of Holstein.
Jane Morrison	United Kingdom	The ship was wrecked on the Manicougan Shoals. Her crew were rescued. She was on a voyage from Quebec City, Province of Canada, British North America to the Clyde.
John and Mary	United Kingdom	The ship ran aground on the West Rocks, in the North Sea off the coast of Essex. She was on a voyage from Hartlepool, County Durham to London. She was refloated the next day and taken in to Harwich.
John Mowlam	United Kingdom	The ship was wrecked on the Long Sand, in the North Sea off the coast of Essex. Her crew were rescued. She was on a voyage from Hartlepool to Weymouth, Dorset.
Mary	United Kingdom	The brig ran aground on the Herd Sand, in the North Sea off the coast of County Durham. She was on a voyage from London to South Shields, County Durham. She was refloated.
Queen	United Kingdom	The ship was driven ashore at Blakeney, Norfolk. She was on a voyage from Maldon, Essex to Leeds, Yorkshire. She was refloated on 17 January and sailed for Goole, Yorkshire.
Sedinstro	Kingdom of Lombardy–Venetia	The ship sank at Ramsgate, Kent, United Kingdom.
Superior	United Kingdom	The ship was driven ashore east of Rye, Sussex. Her crew were rescued. She was on a voyage from Honfleur, Calvados, France to Sunderland, County Durham. She was refloated on 15 January and taken in to Rye.
Sirene	United Kingdom	The ship was wrecked at Bembridge, Isle of Wight. Her crew were rescued.
Symmetry	United Kingdom	The ship was wrecked on the Gunfleet Sand, in the North Sea off the coast of Essex. Her crew were rescued by the fishing smack Atalanta (United Kingdom).
Urania	United Kingdom	The schooner was wrecked on the Attwood Key. She was on a voyage from Nassau, Bahamas to Saint Thomas, Virgin Islands.

== 2 January ==
List of shipwrecks: 2 January 1846
Ship	State	Description
Caroline Margaretha	Netherlands	The ship was driven ashore at Ulfshale, Denmark. She was refloated and taken in to Stege.
Deveron	United Kingdom	The ship was wrecked on Grand Manan, Nova Scotia, British North America. She was on a voyage from Newcastle upon Tyne, Northumberland to Saint John, New Brunswick, British North America.
Elizabeth	United Kingdom	The ship was driven ashore on Knee Island, County Antrim. She was on a voyage from Whitehaven, Cumberland to Londonderry.
Marida	Stettin	The ship was wrecked near Rostock with the loss of two of her crew. She was on a voyage from Liverpool, Lancashire, United Kingdom to Stettin.
Success	United Kingdom	The ship was wrecked on the Scroby Sands, Norfolk. Her crew were rescued. She was on a voyage from London to Goole, Yorkshire.
Tory	United Kingdom	The ship was discovered at sea derelict. She was towed in to Calais, France by HMS Widgeon (Royal Navy).

== 3 January ==
List of shipwrecks: 3 January 1846
Ship	State	Description
Achilles	United Kingdom	The barque was wrecked at "Port Mallespina", Patagonia, Argentina. Her crew were rescued.
Albion	United Kingdom	The ship was wrecked on the coast of Patagonia.
Brilliant	United Kingdom	The ship was wrecked in the Porto de Mello, on the coast of Patagonia. Her crew were rescued.
Caroline Lesure	United Kingdom	The ship departed from Liverpool, Lancashire for Belfast, County Antrim. Subsequently foundered in the Irish Sea with the presumed loss of all hands.
Catharine	United Kingdom	The ship was wrecked in the Desejada Islands, off the coast of Patagonia. Her crew were rescued.
Champion	United Kingdom	The ship was driven ashore at Ramsgate, Kent. She was on a voyage from Genoa, Kingdom of Sardinia to London. She was refloated and taken in to Ramsgate.
Concordia	United Kingdom	The ship, which had been abandoned before 1 January, foundered in the North Sea. She was on a voyage from Teignmouth, Devon to Newcastle upon Tyne, Northumberland.
Eagle	United Kingdom	The barque was wrecked in Camerone's Bay, Patagonia. Her crew were rescued.
Edwards	United Kingdom	The barque was wrecked on the coast of Patagonia. Her crew were rescued.
Elizabeth	United Kingdom	The brig or full-rigged ship was wrecked in the Desejada Islands. Her crew were rescued.
Explorer or Exporter	United Kingdom	The barque was wrecked in Camerone's Bay. Her crew were rescued.
Integrity	United Kingdom	The barque was wrecked in Camerone's Bay. Her seventeen crew were rescued.
Jane Dixson	United Kingdom	The brig was wrecked in the Desejada Islands. Her crew were rescued.
James Dixon	United Kingdom	The ship was wrecked on the coast of Patagonia. Her crew were rescued.
Juliana	(United Kingdom of Great Britain and Ireland) Guernsey	The brig ran aground on the Long Sand, in the North Sea off the coast of Essex. She was refloated and resumed her voyage.
Lark	United Kingdom	The ship was driven ashore east of Littlehampton, Sussex. She was on a voyage from Sunderland, County Durham to Littlehampton. She was refloated on 9 January and taken in to Littlehampton.
Lord Byron	United Kingdom	The ship ran aground at Lytham St. Annes, Lancashire.
Manchester	United Kingdom	The ship ran aground in the Delaware River at Marcus Hook, Pennsylvania, United States. She was on a voyage from Rotterdam, South Holland, Netherlands to Philadelphia, Pennsylvania. She was refloated on 7 January.
Mary	United Kingdom	The brig was severely damaged on the coast of Patagonia.
Mercy	United Kingdom	The full-rigged ship was wrecked in the Bahia de Mallespina, on the coast of Patagonia with the loss of fifteen of her sixteen crew.
Minerva	United Kingdom	The full-rigged ship was wrecked in the Bahia de Mallespina. Her crew were rescued.
St. Croix	Denmark	The ship struck a sunken rock and foundered off Gotland, Sweden. Her crew were rescued.
Stewarts	United Kingdom	The ship was driven ashore in the Bay of Luce. She was on a voyage from Drogheda, County Louth to Islay, Inner Hebrides.
Velocity	United Kingdom	The steamship ran aground at South Shields, County Durham. She was on a voyage from South Shields to Aberdeen. She was refloated on 6 January.
Yarmouth	United Kingdom	The ship ran aground and was severely damaged in the River Suir. She was on a voyage from New York, United States to Waterford. She was refloated and taken in to Waterford.

== 4 January ==
List of shipwrecks: 4 January 1846
Ship	State	Description
Amitie	Denmark	The brigantine was collided with Donna Carmelita (United Kingdom) with the loss of one of her seven crew. Survivors were rescued by Donna Carmelita. Amitie was subsequently driven ashore near Seaford, Sussex, United Kingdom. She was on a voyage from Antwerp to the Cape Verde Islands.
Charles	United Kingdom	The ship ran aground on the Woolseners, in the English Channel. She was on a voyage from Lyme, Dorset to Sunderland, County Durham. She was refloated and put in to Portsmouth, Hampshire.
Comet	United Kingdom	The ship ran aground at Redcar, Yorkshire. She was refloated and put in to the River Tees.
Essequibo	United Kingdom	The ship was wrecked on the Coblers, off the coast of Barbados. Her crew were rescued.
Janet	United Kingdom	The schooner ran aground on a sunken rock in the Sound of Mull. Her crew were rescued. She was on a voyage from Liverpool, Lancashire to Burghead, Morayshire. She was refloated on 12 January and was beached at Tobermory, Mull.
Mary	United Kingdom	The sloop was driven ashore near Gullane Ness, Lothian and was abandoned by her crew. She was discovered derelict in the North Sea on 6 January. Mary was on a voyage from Stonehaven, Aberdeenshire to Leith, Lothian. She was taken in to Canty Bay and then Dunbar, Lothian.
Merlin	United Kingdom	The schooner was destroyed by fire whilst on a voyage from Porto, Portugal to London. Her crew were rescued by a Spanish felucca.
Spey	United Kingdom	The brig foundered in the Irish Sea.

== 5 January ==
List of shipwrecks: 5 January 1846
Ship	State	Description
Leonie	France	The ship was driven ashore in St. Mary's Sound, Isles of Scilly, United Kingdom. She was on a voyage from the Charente to Liverpool, Lancashire. She was refloated on 12 January and taken in to St. Mary's.
Syria	United Kingdom	The ship was wrecked on the Manicougan Shoals. She was on a voyage from Quebec City, Province of Canada, British North America to London.

== 6 January ==
List of shipwrecks: 6 January 1846
Ship	State	Description
Ann	United Kingdom	The ship was driven ashore near "Saint-Frieux", Pas-de-Calais, France. Her crew were rescued. She was on a voyage from Portsmouth, Hampshire to Blyth, Northumberland. She was refloated on 11 January and taken in to Boulogne, Pas-de-Calais in a sinking condition.
Elizabeth	United Kingdom	The ship was driven ashore at Ayr. She was on a voyage from Stranraer, Wigtownshire to Ayr.
Johanna Charlotte	Denmark	The ship was driven ashore at Brokdorf, Duchy of Holstein. She was on a voyage from Aarhus to "Reiersøl".

== 7 January ==
List of shipwrecks: 7 January 1846
Ship	State	Description
Anthony Anderson	United Kingdom	The full-rigged ship was driven ashore and wrecked on Sea Lion Island, Patagonia, Argentina. Her crew were rescued.
Bride	United Kingdom	The brig was driven ashore and wrecked on Sea Lion Island. Her crew were rescued.
Charlotte	United Kingdom	The barque was driven ashore and wrecked on Sea Lion Island. Her crew were rescued.
Elizabeth	United Kingdom	The ship was driven ashore at Islandmagee, County Antrim. She was on a voyage from Ayr to Belfast. She was refloated the next day.
Eliza Hayward	United Kingdom	The brig was wrecked on a reef off Penguin Island, Patagonia. Her crew were rescued.
Gazelle	United Kingdom	The schooner was driven ashore and wrecked on Sea Lion Island. Her crew were rescued.
Harper	United Kingdom	The barque was driven ashore and wrecked on Sea Lion Island. Her crew were rescued.
John	United Kingdom	The brig was driven ashore and wrecked on Sea Lion Island. Her crew were rescued.
Nightingale	United Kingdom	The barque was driven ashore and wrecked on Sea Lion Island. Her crew were rescued.
Ocean Queen	United Kingdom	The barque was driven ashore and wrecked on Sea Lion Island. Her crew were rescued.
Prince of Orange	United Kingdom	The ship was driven ashore at Islandmagee. She was on a voyage from Beaumaris, Anglesey to Portrush, County Antrim. She was refloated the next day.
Rebecca	United Kingdom	The ship struck rocks off Düne, Heligoland and foundered. Her crew were rescued. She was on a voyage from Friedrichstadt, Duchy of Holstein to London. She came ashore on Heligoland on 11 February in a wrecked condition.
Richard	United Kingdom	The brig was wrecked on a reef off Penguin Island. Her crew were rescued.
Stewarts	United Kingdom	The brig was driven ashore and wrecked on Sea Lion Island. Her crew were rescued.
Thomas Leech	United Kingdom	The ship was driven ashore and wrecked on Long Island, Patagonia, Argentina.
William and Henry	United Kingdom	The brig was wrecked on a reef off Penguin Island. Her crew were rescued.

== 8 January ==
List of shipwrecks: 8 January 1846
Ship	State	Description
Dutchess	Portugal	The ship was wrecked on Terceira Island, Azores, Her crew were rescued.
Ellen	United Kingdom	The ship was driven ashore at Terceira, Azores. Her crew were rescued. She was consequently condemned.
Glideaway	United Kingdom	The ship departed from Stockton-on-Tees, County Durham for Porto, Portugal. No further trace, presumed foundered with the loss of all hands.
Lesbia	Russia	The full-rigged ship was driven ashore and wrecked on Mytilene, Greece.
Margaret and Isabella	United Kingdom	The ship was driven ashore in Loch Erribol. Her crew were rescued. She was on a voyage from Portmahomack, Ross-shire to an Irish port.
Scandinavian	Denmark	The ship was driven ashore and wrecked on Wangeroog, Kingdom of Hanover. She was on a voyage from Copenhagen to Amsterdam, North Holland, Netherlands.
Unity	United Kingdom	The ship was driven ashore in Loch Erribol. Her crew were rescued. She was on a voyage from Lerwick, Shetland Islands to Liverpool, Lancashire.
Williams	United Kingdom	The ship was driven ashore in Loch Erribol. Her crew were rescued.

== 9 January ==
List of shipwrecks: 9 January 1846
Ship	State	Description
Duke of Sussex	Grand Duchy of Tuscany	The brigantine was driven ashore and wrecked on Madeira. Her crew were rescued.
Josephine	France	The ship was wrecked on the "Four". She was on a voyage from Nantes, Loire-Inférieure to Dunkirk, Nord.
Grecian	United States of the Ionian Islands	The ship was driven ashore on Cephalonia. She was on a voyage from Trieste to Cephalonia. She was later refloated.
King William	United Kingdom	The ship ran aground on the Holmes Sandbank, in the English Channel. She was on a voyage from Portsmouth, Hampshire to Sierral Leone. She was refloated and resumed her voyage.
Possidone	Greece	The brig was wrecked on a sandbank off the Gallipoli Lighthouse, Ottoman Empire. She was on a voyage from Constantinople, Ottoman Empire to Marseille, Bouches-du-Rhône, France.
Seven Brothers	United Kingdom	The ship was in collision with Don (United Kingdom) and was abandoned in the Irish Sea off St. Davids Head, Pembrokeshire. She was on a voyage from Llanelly, Glamorgan to Waterford. Seven Brothers was subsequently towed in to Milford Haven, Pembrokeshire.

== 10 January ==
List of shipwrecks: 10 January 1846
Ship	State	Description
Joanna	United Kingdom	The ship departed from Hayle, Cornwall for a Mediterranean port. No further trace, presumed foundered with the loss of all hands.
Norden	Hamburg	The ship departed from South Shields, County Durham, United Kingdom for Odesa. No further trace, presumed foundered with the loss of all hands.
Orwell	United Kingdom	The ship was driven ashore at Winterton-on-Sea, Norfolk. She was on a voyage from Blyth, Northumberland to Rouen, Seine-Inférieure, France. Orwell was refloated and taken in to Great Yarmouth, Norfolk.

== 11 January ==
List of shipwrecks: 11 January 1846
Ship	State	Description
Ariel	United States	The ship was wrecked on a reef in the Caicos Islands. Her crew were rescued. She was on a voyage from Cap-Haïtien, Haiti to Boston, Massachusetts.
Emma	Bremen	The ship was holed by ice at Tönning, Duchy of Holstein.
Haytian Packet	Bremen	The ship was wrecked on a reef west of the Caicos Islands. She was on a voyage from Cap-Haïtien to Bremen.
Johann Christophe	Hamburg	The ship ran aground off Schulau. She was on a voyage from Bahia, Brazil to Hamburg. She was later refloated.
Princess Marie	France	The ship ran aground at Tampico, Mexico and was damaged. She was on a voyage from Bordeaux, Gironde to Tampico. She was refloated.
HMRC Sealark	Board of Customs	The cutter ran aground on the Goodwin Sands, Kent.

== 12 January ==
List of shipwrecks: 12 January 1846
Ship	State	Description
Eliza Ann	(United Kingdom of Great Britain and Ireland) Cape Colony	The cutter was wrecked at the mouth of the Orange River.
Francis	United Kingdom	The ship ran aground at Great Yarmouth, Norfolk. She was on a voyage from Ipswich, Suffolk to Great Yarmouth. She was refloated.
Thyme or Time	United Kingdom	The ship ran aground and was wrecked at Dungarvan, County Waterford. Her crew were rescued. She was on a voyage from Cardiff, Glamorgan to Cork.
Victoria	United Kingdom	The ship was wrecked in Carnarvon Bay with the loss of two lives.

== 13 January ==
List of shipwrecks: 13 January 1846
Ship	State	Description
Eliza	(United Kingdom of Great Britain and Ireland) Jamaica	The ship was wrecked in St. Ann's Bay. She was on a voyage from Montego Bay to Falmouth, Jamaica.
Giuseppe	France	The ship ran aground on the Dear Bank, in the English Channel. She was on a voyage from Marseille, Bouches-du-Rhône to Antwerp, Belgium. She was refloated and taken in to Portsmouth, Hampshire, United Kingdom in a leaky condition.
James and Christian	United Kingdom	The sloop ran aground on the Sparrow Hawk Sand, in the North Sea off the coast of County Durham. She was on a voyage from Bo'ness, Lothian to Newcastle upon Tyne, Northumberland. She was refloated and taken in to North Shields, County Durham in a leaky condition.
Karen Hedvig	Denmark	The ship was driven ashore at "Molilcle". Her crew were rescued. She was on a voyage from Newcastle upon Tyne, Northumberland, United Kingdom to Copenhagen.
Trial	United Kingdom	The brig was wrecked at "Villanova de San Antonio", Spain. Her crew were rescued. She was on a voyage from Gibraltar to Ayamonte, Spain.

== 14 January ==
List of shipwrecks: 14 January 1846
Ship	State	Description
Amitie	France	The ship was driven ashore in the Cattewater. She was on a voyage from Havre de Grâce, Seine-Inférieure to Goree, Zeeland, Netherlands. She was refloated.
Margaretta	Kingdom of Hanover	The ship was driven ashore and wrecked at Sunderland, County Durham, United Kingdom. Her crew were rescued. She was on a voyage from Emden to Newfoundland, British North America.
Montezuma	United Kingdom	The ship departed from Laguna for Cork. No further trace, presumed foundered with the loss of all hands.
Robina	United Kingdom	The ship departed from Killybegs, County Donegal whilst on a voyage from the Clyde to Rio de Janeiro, Brazil. No further trace, presumed foundered with the loss of all hands.
Silesia	United Kingdom	The Barking smack was abandoned in the North Sea east of Cromer, Norfolk. Her five crew landed at Mundesley, Norfolk on 17 January.

== 15 January ==
List of shipwrecks: 15 January 1846
Ship	State	Description
Franklin	Hamburg	The barque ran aground in the Elbe downstream of Blankenese She was on a voyage from Hamburg to New York, United States. She was refloated and resumed her voyage.
Joe	United Kingdom	The ship collided with the brig Ocean (France) and sank in the Atlantic Ocean off the Isles of Scilly. Her crew were rescued. She was on a voyage from Newport, Monmouthshire to Málaga, Spain.
Lady Mary Scott	United Kingdom	The ship ran aground of the Arklow Bank, in the Irish Sea off the coast of County Wicklow. She was on a voyage from Liverpool, Lancashire to Trinidad. She was refloated and put in to Kingstown, County Dublin in a leaky condition.
Skiold	Denmark	The full-rigged ship ran aground in the Elbe downstream of Blankenese.

== 16 January ==
List of shipwrecks: 16 January 1846
Ship	State	Description
Bombay	United Kingdom	The ship ran aground in the River Thames. She was on a voyage from London to Bombay, India. She was refloated and put in to Gravesend, Kent.
Fourteen	United Kingdom	The ship was driven onto rocks and sank at South Shields, County Durham. She was refloated on 21 January and beached.
Helena Christina	Netherlands	The ship ran aground on a coral reef. She was refloated and put back to Surabaya, Netherlands East Indies.
Royal William	United Kingdom	The paddle steamer ran aground on the Black Rocks, off the coast of Lothian. Her passengers were taken off. She was on a voyage from London to Leith, Lothian.

== 17 January ==
List of shipwrecks: 17 January 1846
Ship	State	Description
Ben Lomond	United Kingdom	The ship ran aground off "Shap Island" and was beached near Campbeltown, Argyllshire. Her crew were rescued. She was on a voyage from Greenock, Renfrewshire to Mobile, Alabama, United States. She was refloated in early March and taken in to Greenock for repairs.
Clifton	United Kingdom	The ship was driven ashore in the Dardanelles. She was on a voyage from Odesa to an English port. She was refloated.
James	United Kingdom	The ship ran aground on the Blackwater Bank, in the Irish Sea. She was refloated and put in to Kingstown, County Dublin.
Joseph	United Kingdom	The ship ran aground on the Arklow Banks, in the Irish Sea off the coast of County Wicklow. She was on a voyage from Liverpool, Lancashire to Trieste. She was refloated and put back to Liverpool.
Rapid	United Kingdom	The ship was driven ashore in the River Tay. She was on a voyage from Dundee, Forfarshire to Stockton-on-Tees, County Durham. She was refloated and put back to Dundee.
Scilly	United Kingdom	The schooner was abandoned off Cabo da Roca, Portugal. Her crew reached shore safely.
Scotia	(United Kingdom of Great Britain and Ireland) British North America	The ship was wrecked on Ellenwood Island, in the Tusket Islands, Nova Scotia. Her crew were rescued. She was on a voyage from Halifax, Nova Scotia to Saint John, New Brunswick.
Ville de Marans	France	The ship was driven ashore and wrecked at Tynemouth, Northumberland, United Kingdom. Her crew were rescued. She was on a voyage from Marans, Charente-Maritime to South Shields, County Durham, United Kingdom.
Zilli	United Kingdom	The schooner was abandoned in the Atlantic Ocean off Cabo da Rocha. Her six crew were rescued by the schooner Carden (United Kingdom). Zilli was on a voyage from St. Ives, Cornwall to Civitavecchia, Papal States. She came ashore near Ericeira, Portugal on 9 February.

== 18 January ==
List of shipwrecks: 18 January 1846
Ship	State	Description
Ann	United Kingdom	The ship was driven ashore and wrecked at Strangford, County Antrim. Her crew were rescued.
Lady Bassett	United Kingdom	The schooner was wrecked 5 nautical miles (9.3 km) south of the Cádiz Lighthouse, Spain. Her crew were rescued.
Lotus	United States	The ship was destroyed by fire in the James River.
Red Port	United Kingdom	The ship ran aground and was damaged at the mouth of the Douro. She was on a voyage from London to Porto, Portugal.
Seaflower	United States	The ship was run down and sunk by Hope (United Kingdom). Her crew were rescued. She was on a voyage from Providence, Rhode Island to Wilmington, Delaware.
Swift	United Kingdom	The ship ran aground and sank in the Clyde.
Thomas Cooke	United Kingdom	The ship departed from New York for Hull, Yorkshire. No further trace, presumed foundered with the loss of all hands.

== 19 January ==
List of shipwrecks: 19 January 1846
Ship	State	Description
Acapulco	United Kingdom	The ship was driven ashore and wrecked on "Penguin Island", Patagonia, Argentina.
Ann and Elizabeth	United Kingdom	The schooner was driven ashore and wrecked at Spithead, Hampshire. Her six crew were rescued. She was on a voyage from Cardiff, Glamorgan to London. She was refloated on 11 February and beached in shallow water.
Aurore	(United Kingdom of Great Britain and Ireland) Jersey	The schooner capsized and was severely damaged at Jersey. She was on a voyage from Jersey to Rio de Janeiro, Brazil.
Commerce	United Kingdom	The ship was driven ashore at Hartlepool, County Durham. She was refloated and taken in to Hartlepool.
Deux Clementines	France	The brig was wrecked at Ciudad del Carmen, Mexico. She was on a voyage from Havre de Grâce, Seine-Inférieure to Veracruz and Laguna
Francis Spaight	United Kingdom	The ship was wrecked in Table Bay with the loss of fifteen of her crew. She was on a voyage from Manila, Spanish East Indies to London.
Papineau	United Kingdom	The brig departed from Aux Cayes, Haiti for Cork, Ireland. No further trace, presumed foundered with the loss of all hands.
Pheasant	United Kingdom	The ship foundered off Hartland Point, Devon. Her crew were rescued. She was on a voyage from Cardiff to Littlehampton, Sussex.
Rebecca	United Kingdom	The ship struck rocks and foundered off Düne, Heligoland. Her crew were rescued. She was on a voyage from Fredrikstad, Norway to London.
HMS Spitfire	Royal Navy	The gunvessel ran aground on Ithaca, United States of the Ionian Islands. She was on a voyage from Malta to the Ionian Islands. She was later refloated and taken in to Corfu, Greece for repairs.
Starling	United Kingdom	The yawl capsized off Great Yarmouth, Norfolk. All twelve people on board were rescued.
Wellington	United Kingdom	The ship was driven ashore at Annalong, County Down. Her crew were rescued. She was on a voyage from Maryport, Cumberland to Dublin.
Zephyr	United Kingdom	The brig was driven ashore and wrecked on Stronsay, Orkney Islands with the loss of all hands. The ship's cat survived.

== 20 January ==
List of shipwrecks: 20 January 1846
Ship	State	Description
Arab	United States	The barque was abandoned in the Atlantic Ocean. her crew were rescued by Four Brothers (United Kingdom). She was on a voyage from Boston, Massachusetts to Cork, United Kingdom.
Emblem	United Kingdom	The ship was driven ashore at Liverpool, Lancashire. She was on a voyage from New Orleans, Louisiana, United States to Liverpool She was refloated.
Gebkea or Gelikin	Kingdom of Hanover	The ship struck rocks and sank off Inchkeith. She was on a voyage from Emden to Port Dundas, Renfrewshire, United Kingdom.
Marens Minde	Norway	The ship was driven ashore. She was on a voyage from "Naskau" to Leith, Lothian, United Kingdom. She was refloated and put in to Bergen.
Mary	United Kingdom	The schooner was driven ashore in Church Bay, Rathlin Island, County Donegal. She was on a voyage from Limerick to Glasgow, Renfrewshire.
Savannah	United States	The ship was driven ashore 5 nautical miles (9.3 km) from Southport, Lancashire. She was on a voyage from Mobile, Alabama to Liverpool.
Scotland	(United Kingdom of Great Britain and Ireland) British North America	The barque was driven ashore and wrecked near Pwllheli, Caernarfonshire. She was on a voyage from Liverpool to New Orleans.
Siddons	United Kingdom	The ship was driven ashore at Liverpool. She was on a voyage from New York, United States to Liverpool. She was refloated.
Susannah Cumming	United Kingdom	The full-rigged ship was driven ashore and wrecked 5 nautical miles (9.3 km) south of Southport, Lancashire. She was on a voyage from Mobile, Alabama, United States to Liverpool.

== 21 January ==
List of shipwrecks: 21 January 1846
Ship	State	Description
Guide	(United Kingdom of Great Britain and Ireland) New South Wales	The brig was driven ashore and wrecked at Wakapuaka, New Zealand.
Jane	United Kingdom	The schooner was holed by an anchor and beached at Wallsend, Northumberland. She was later refloated and towed in to South Shields, County Durham for repairs.
Melrose	United Kingdom	The ship sprang a leak and foundered in the North Sea 40 nautical miles (74 km) off the coast of Yorkshire with the loss of a crew member.
Montefiores	United Kingdom	The East Indiaman ran aground on the Maplin Sand, in the North Sea off the coast of Essex. She was on a voyage from Mauritius to London. She was refloated and put in to Gravesend, Kent.
Ranger	United Kingdom	The ship collided with Navigator (United Kingdom) and sank in the North Sea off the coast of Yorkshire with the loss of a crew member.
Sophia	United States	The ship was abandoned in the Atlantic Ocean. Her crew were rescued by Bussell (United Kingdom). Sophia was on a voyage from Valparaíso, Chile to New Orleans, Louisiana.

== 22 January ==
List of shipwrecks: 22 January 1846
Ship	State	Description
Cotier	France	The ship ran aground on the Haaks Bank, in the North Sea off the Dutch coast and was abandoned. She was on a voyage from Nantes, Loire-Inférieure to Amsterdam, North Holland, Netherlands.
Escualduna	France	The barque was in collision with Ocean (Russia) and was abandoned in the Atlantic Ocean 70 leagues (210 nautical miles (390 km)) west north west of The Lizard, Cornwall, United Kingdom. Her eight crew were rescued by Ocean. Escualduna was on a voyage from Liverpool, Lancashire, United Kingdom to Marseille, Bouches-du-Rhône, France. She was discovered the next day by Ann (United Kingdom). Three men were put aboard but she foundered with their loss.
Milford Packet	United Kingdom	The ship was driven ashore at Pill, Somerset. She was on a voyage from Milford Haven, Pembrokeshire to Bristol, Gloucestershire. She was refloated.
Orion	United Kingdom	The ship ran aground in the Orkney Islands. She was on a voyage from a Baltic port to Liverpool.

== 23 January ==
List of shipwrecks: 23 January 1846
Ship	State	Description
Falkland	United Kingdom	The brigantine was wrecked on the Great Bottle Key. Her crew were rescued. She was on a voyage from Halifax, Nova Scotia, British North America to Port Antonio, Jamaica.
Mary Ann	United Kingdom	The ship ran aground on the Gawling Rocks, off Strangford, County Antrim. She was on a voyage from Strangford to Workington, Cumberland. She was refloated the next day and resumed her voyage.
Neptune	(United Kingdom of Great Britain and Ireland) Jersey	The ship was wrecked in St. Brelades Bay. Her crew were rescued. She was on a voyage from Jersey to Guernsey, Channel Islands.
Pero	United Kingdom	The ship was driven ashore on Lady Island, Ayrshire. She was on a voyage from Ballina, County Mayo to Troon, Ayrshire.

== 24 January ==
List of shipwrecks: 24 January 1846
Ship	State	Description
Adelaide	United Kingdom	The schooner was driven ashore at Greenisland, County Antrim. She was on a voyage from Glasgow, Renfrewshire to Drogheda, County Louth. She was refloated and taken in to Warrenpoint, County Antrim.
Anaxis	France	The ship struck the St Islec Cayes. She was refloated and taken in to Pointe-à-Pitre, Guadeloupe in a leaky condition.
Ellen	United Kingdom	The ship ran aground on the Whitby Rock. She was on a voyage from Stockton-on-Tees, County Durham to London. She was refloated and resumed her voyage.
Mary Ann	United Kingdom	The ship was in collision with Princess Alice (United Kingdom) and was abandoned off the Mull of Galloway with the loss of a crew member.
Mary Barbara	United Kingdom	The ship was abandoned in the Atlantic Ocean. Her crew were rescued by Governor Davis (United Kingdom). Mary Barbara was on a voyage from Saint Domingo to Liverpool, Lancashire.
Rutland	United Kingdom	The ship was wrecked near the South Rock Lighthouse, County Down. Her crew were rescued.

== 25 January ==
List of shipwrecks: 25 January 1846
Ship	State	Description
Countess of Errol	United Kingdom	The ship was in collision with Norden and sank in the North Sea off the Dudgeon Lightship ( Trinity House). Her crew were rescued. She was on a voyage from South Shields, County Durham to Rye, Sussex.
Despatch	United Kingdom	The schooner collided with the steamship Gazelle (United Kingdom) and foundered 4 nautical miles (7.4 km) off the Dudgeon Lightship ( Trinity House). Her crew were rescued by Gazelle. Despatch was on a voyage from Sunderland, County Durham to Ipswich, Suffolk.
Eliza Hilberry	United Kingdom	The ship was abandoned in the Atlantic Ocean. Her crew were rescued by Speed (United Kingdom). Eliza Hilberry was on a voyage from Saint Andrews, New Brunswick, British North America to London.
George	United Kingdom	The ship was wrecked on the Holm Sand, in the North Sea off the coast of Suffolk. Her crew were rescued.
Harmony	(United Kingdom of Great Britain and Ireland) British North America	The schooner was abandoned in the South Atlantic.
Mary Ann	United Kingdom	The ship was driven ashore at Glasserton, Wigtownshire. Her crew were rescued. She was on a voyage from Belfast, County Antrim to Maryport, Cumberland.
Sirene	United Kingdom	The ship was driven ashore at Scoughall, Lothian. She was on refloated.
Sophia	Bremen	The ship was driven ashore in the Weser. She was on a voyage from Bremerhaven to Africa. She was refloated the next day and resumed her voyage.

== 26 January ==
List of shipwrecks: 26 January 1846
Ship	State	Description
Catherine	(United Kingdom of Great Britain and Ireland) British North America	The barque was abandoned in the Atlantic Ocean. All twenty people on board were rescued by Brarens (Hamburg). Catherine was on a voyage from Halifax, Nova Scotia to Liverpool, Lancashire.
Concordia	United Kingdom	The ship ran aground on the Arklow Banks, in the Irish Sea off the coast of County Wicklow. She was on a voyage from Liverpool to Boston, Massachusetts, United States. She was refloated and put in to Holyhead, Anglesey.
Ebenezer	Sweden	The ship was wrecked on the Sandhammer with the loss of all hands.
Ellen and Mary	United Kingdom	The ship was damaged by fire at Sunderland, County Durham.
Flora	United Kingdom	The ship struck a sunken wreck off Southwold, Suffolk and was damaged. She put in to Great Yarmouth, Norfolk in a leaky condition.
Ida	United Kingdom	The barque was abandoned in the Atlantic Ocean. All 56 people on board were rescued by the schooner Three Sisters (United Kingdom). Ida was on a voyage from Portsmouth, Hampshire for Saint John, New Brunswick, British North America.
James	United Kingdom	The ship was driven ashore and wrecked 8 nautical miles (15 km) east of Calais, France. She was on a voyage from London to Trinidad.
John Mitchell	United Kingdom	The ship was driven ashore and severely damaged at Port Gaverne, Cornwall.
Mary Ann	United Kingdom	The schooner ran aground on the Herd Sand, in the North Sea off the coast of County Durham and was wrecked. She was refloated on 30 January and taken in to South Shields in a severely damaged condition.
Waterwitch	(United Kingdom of Great Britain and Ireland) Jersey	The ship was wrecked on the Longsand or the Kentish Knock. Her crew were rescued by HMRC Scout ( Board of Customs). She was on a voyage from Sunderland, County Durham to Jersey.
William and Henry	United Kingdom	The ship was driven ashore in the Sound of Islay, She was on a voyage from Wick, Caithness to Dundalk, County Louth. She was refloated and taken in to McDougall's Bay.

== 27 January ==
List of shipwrecks: 27 January 1846
Ship	State	Description
Bertha	United Kingdom	The schooner was driven ashore in the Dardanelles. She was on a voyage from Liverpool, Lancashire to Constantinople, Ottoman Empire. She was later refloated and completed her voyage on 4 February.
Frederickshanen	Russia	The ship ran aground on Grassground. She was on a voyage from Reval to Riga. She was refloated.
Harriet	Hamburg	The ship was driven ashore in the Elbe downstream of Blankenese. She was on a voyage from Hamburg to Havana and Matanzas, Cuba.
Jessie Scott	United Kingdom	The ship struck a sunken rock off the South Rock Lighthouse, County Down and was severely damaged. She was on a voyage from Wick, Caithness, to Drogheda, County Louth. She put in to Ballyhury Bay for temporary repairs.
Martha	United Kingdom	The ship was driven ashore near Gijón, Spain. Her crew were rescued.
Prince George	United Kingdom	The ship ran aground on the Herd Sand, in the North Sea off the coast of County Durham. She was refloated on 30 January.
Ripley	United Kingdom	The ship ran aground at Corkbeg, County Cork. She was on a voyage from Cork to the Clyde.
Success	United Kingdom	The ship ran aground on the Long Sand, in the North Sea off the coast of Essex. She was on a voyage from London to Calcutta, India. She was refloated and put in to Margate, Kent.

== 28 January ==
List of shipwrecks: 28 January 1846
Ship	State	Description
Alfred	(United Kingdom of Great Britain and Ireland) New South Wales	The ship collided with the steamship Rose ( (United Kingdom of Great Britain and Ireland) New South Wales) and sank. Her crew were rescued. She was on a voyage from Brisbane Water to Sydney.
Confiance en Dieu	France	The brig was wrecked at Mersin, Ottoman Empire with some loss of life. She was on a voyage from Alexandretta, Ottoman Empire to Marseille, Bouches-du-Rhône.
Guide	(United Kingdom of Great Britain and Ireland) New South Wales	The brig was wrecked near Wakapuaka, New Zealand, en route from Sydney. The captain mistook Wakapuaka harbour for French Pass during a gale, and the ship grounded on a sandbar.
Uniao	Portugal	The barque was wrecked at Tamatave, Madagascar with the loss of 50 of the 55 people on board.
Young Sons	United Kingdom	The sloop foundered in the North Sea 5 nautical miles (9.3 km) off Pittenweem, Fife. Her crew survived. She was on a voyage from Burntisland, Fife to Eyemouth, Berwickshire.

== 29 January ==
List of shipwrecks: 29 January 1846
Ship	State	Description
Jacques	United Kingdom	The ship was abandoned in the Atlantic Ocean. Her crew were rescued by Venelia (France). Jacques was on a voyage from Martinique to Havre de Grâce, Seine-Inférieure.
Portland	United Kingdom	The barque foundered in the Atlantic Ocean. Her crew were rescued by Denison (United Kingdom). Portland was on a voyage from Cuba to London.
Shamrock	United Kingdom	The ship ran aground on the West Hoyle Sandbank, in Liverpool Bay and was damaged. She was on a voyage from Liverpool, Lancashire to Perth. She was refloated and put back to Liverpool.
Vigilant	United Kingdom	The ship was driven ashore at Redcar, Yorkshire. She was on a voyage from King's Lynn, Norfolk to Hartlepool, County Durham. She was later refloated and assisted in the Hartlepool in a leaky condition.

== 30 January ==
List of shipwrecks: 30 January 1846
Ship	State	Description
Eliza	United Kingdom	The ship collided with Content (United Kingdom) and was abandoned in the North Sea off the coast of Essex. Her crew were rescued. Eliza was on a voyage from Sunderland, County Durham to London. She subsequently became a wreck on the Gunfleet Sand.
George IV	United Kingdom	The smack was driven ashore at Bideford, Devon. She was on a voyage from Waterford to Newport, Monmouthshire. She was refloated on 15 March and taken in to Bideford.
Venus	France	The ship was driven ashore near Dunkirk, Nord. Her crew were rescued. She was on a voyage from Blyth, Northumberland, United Kingdom to Dunkirk.
Vigilant	United Kingdom	The ship was driven ashore at Redcar, Yorkshire. She was refloated and put in to Hartlepool, County Durham in a leaky condition.

== 31 January ==
List of shipwrecks: 31 January 1846
Ship	State	Description
Bee	United Kingdom	The ship sprang a leak and was abandoned in the North Sea. Her crew were rescued by Robert (United Kingdom). Bee was on a voyage from Newcastle upon Tyne, Northumberland to Southampton, Hampshire.
Freiderick Wilhelm IV	Danzic	The ship was wrecked on the Jadder, in the North Sea. Her crew were rescued. She was on a voyage from Newcastle upon Tyne, Northumberland to Danzic.
Marquis of Queensbury	United Kingdom	The ship was driven ashore and damaged on the Ness Rocks, Orkney Islands. She was refloated.
Mary	United Kingdom	The barque was wrecked on the West Hoyle Bank, in Liverpool Bay. Her crew were rescued. She was on a voyage from Demerara. British Guiana to Liverpool, Lancashire.
Metta	Kingdom of Hanover	The ship was lost off Westerhever. She was on a voyage from Newcastle upon Tyne to Elsfleth.
Orbit	United Kingdom	The ship ran aground in the River Nene. She was on a voyage from Wisbech, Cambridgeshire to Stockton-on-Tees, County Durham. She was refloated and resumed her voyage.
Sophia	United Kingdom	The ship capsized and sank in the Humber at Brough Yorkshire. Her crew were rescued. She was on a voyage from Goole, Yorkshire to Teignmouth, Devon.
Tesoro	Grand Duchy of Tuscany	The ship was wrecked on the Goodwin Sands, Kent, United Kingdom. Her crew were rescued. She was on a voyage from Newcastle upon Tyne, Northumberland, United Kingdom to Livorno.
Trinidad	(United Kingdom of Great Britain and Ireland) British North America	The brig was abandoned in the Atlantic Ocean. Her crew were rescued by Pink (United Kingdom). Trinidad was on a voyage from Saint Andrews, New Brunswick to Boston, Massachusetts, United States.

== Unknown date ==
List of shipwrecks: Unknown date in January 1846
Ship	State	Description
Agnes	United Kingdom	The ship foundered in the English Channel off Guernsey, Channel Islands before 15 January.
Asia	United Kingdom	The ship was wrecked at Whale Cove, Newfoundland, British North America before 7 January. Her crew were rescued. She was on a voyage from Saint John, New Brunswick, British North America to Cork.
Carolina Margaretha	Denmark	The ship ran aground off Ulvshale. She was refloated on 2 January and taken in to Stege.
Chilmark	United Kingdom	The ship was wrecked on Minorca, Spain before 5 January with the loss of three of her eight crew. She was on a voyage from Liverpool, Lancashire to Genoa, Kingdom of Sardinia.
Dee	United Kingdom	The ship was wrecked on the coast of British Honduras before 20 January. Her crew were rescued.
Ellen	United Kingdom	The barque was lost in the Java Sea. Her crew were rescued.
Esther	United Kingdom	The sealer was wrecked on South Georgia Island before 1 February with the loss of eleven of her 31 crew. Survivors took to their sloop, Bountiful (United Kingdom) and made for Rio de Janeiro, Brazil.
Fidele Lauri	Flag unknown	The ship was wrecked at Fiumicino, Papal States before 2 January.
Henrietta Wilhelmina	Flag unknown	The long-abandoned and waterlogged ship was driven ashore at Barizo, Spain.
Henry Newell	United States	The barque was driven ashore and wrecked on Minorca before 5 January. Her crew were rescued. She was on a voyage from New York to Marseille, Bouches-du-Rhône, France.
James	United Kingdom	The sloop was abandoned in the North Sea before 4 January. She was towed in to Orford Haven, Suffolk on 5 January.
Llantarnam Abbey	United Kingdom	The ship was driven ashore and wrecked in the Chimlicon River, Spanish Honduras before 17 January. Her crew were rescued.
Malay	United Kingdom	The brig ran aground on a reef off "Penguin Island", Argentina. She was refloated and put in to Port Desire, where she was condemned.
Margaret	United Kingdom	The ship was driven ashore at Hoylake, Lancashire before 16 January. She was on a voyage from Bangor, Caernarfonshire to Liverpool. She was later refloated.
Mary	United Kingdom	The ship ran aground on the Herd Sand, in the North Sea off the coast of County Durham. She was refloated on 2 January and taken in to South Shields.
Miram	United Kingdom	The ship was wrecked on Prince Edward Island, British North America. She was on a voyage from Pugwash, Nova Scotia, British North America to Cork.
Neptunus	Sweden	The ship foundered off Stockholm on or before 27 February.
Nicolo Pomo	Russia	The brig was wrecked in the Sea of Marmora before 5 January.
Pagoda	United Kingdom	The ship was abandoned in the Atlantic Ocean before 3 January. Her crew were rescued by Dream (United Kingdom). Pagoda was on a voyage from Mauritius to London.
Patriot	Malta	The barque was wrecked at Cagliari, Sardinia with the loss of two of her crew. She was on a voyage from Odesa to Marseille, Bouches-du-Rhône, France.
Reine des Anges	France	The ship was wrecked on Minorca before 5 January. Her crew were rescued. She was on a voyage from Algiers, Algeria to Marseille.
Triton	France	The ship departed from Adra or Almería, Spain for Trieste. No further trace, presumed foundered with the loss of all hands.
Wave	(United Kingdom of Great Britain and Ireland) New Zealand	The cutter was wrecked at Manawatu. Her crew were rescued.
Widgeon	United Kingdom	The brig ran aground in the English Channel 10 nautical miles (19 km) east of Calais, France and was abandoned. She was on a voyage from South Shields, County Durham to Genoa, Kingdom of Sardinia. Widgeon was taken in to Calais on 2 January.
William Walker	United Kingdom	The schooner was wrecked on Fishermans Island, Maine, United States before 7 January. She was on a voyage from Boston, Massachusetts, United States to Saint Andrew, New Brunswick, British North America.
