= Scougal =

Scougal, also Scougall, is a Scottish surname and may refer to:

Scougal

- Henry Scougal (1650–1678), Scottish theologian
- John Scougal (1645–1730), Scottish painter
- Patrick Scougal (1607–1682), Scottish churchman

Scougall

- David Scougall (c.1610 – c.1680), Scottish portrait painter
- Stefan Scougall (born 1982), Scottish footballer

== See also ==
- Scoughall
