= Auldhame & Scoughall =

Coordinates: 56.051°N 2.652°W

Auldhame and Scoughall
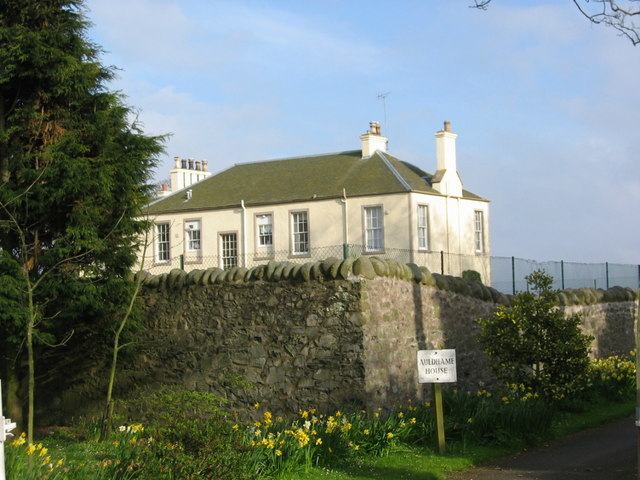
- Auldhame House

- Location within Scotland
- OS grid reference: NT593843
- Council area: East Lothian Council
- Lieutenancy area: East Lothian
- Country: Scotland
- Sovereign state: United Kingdom
- Post town: NORTH BERWICK
- Postcode district: EH39
- Dialling code: 01620
- Police: Scotland
- Fire: Scottish
- Ambulance: Scottish
- UK Parliament: East Lothian
- Scottish Parliament: East Lothian

Auldhame and Scoughall are hamlets in East Lothian, Scotland. They are close to the town of North Berwick and the village of Whitekirk, and are approximately 25 miles (40 km) east of Edinburgh.

== Saint Baldred's legacy ==
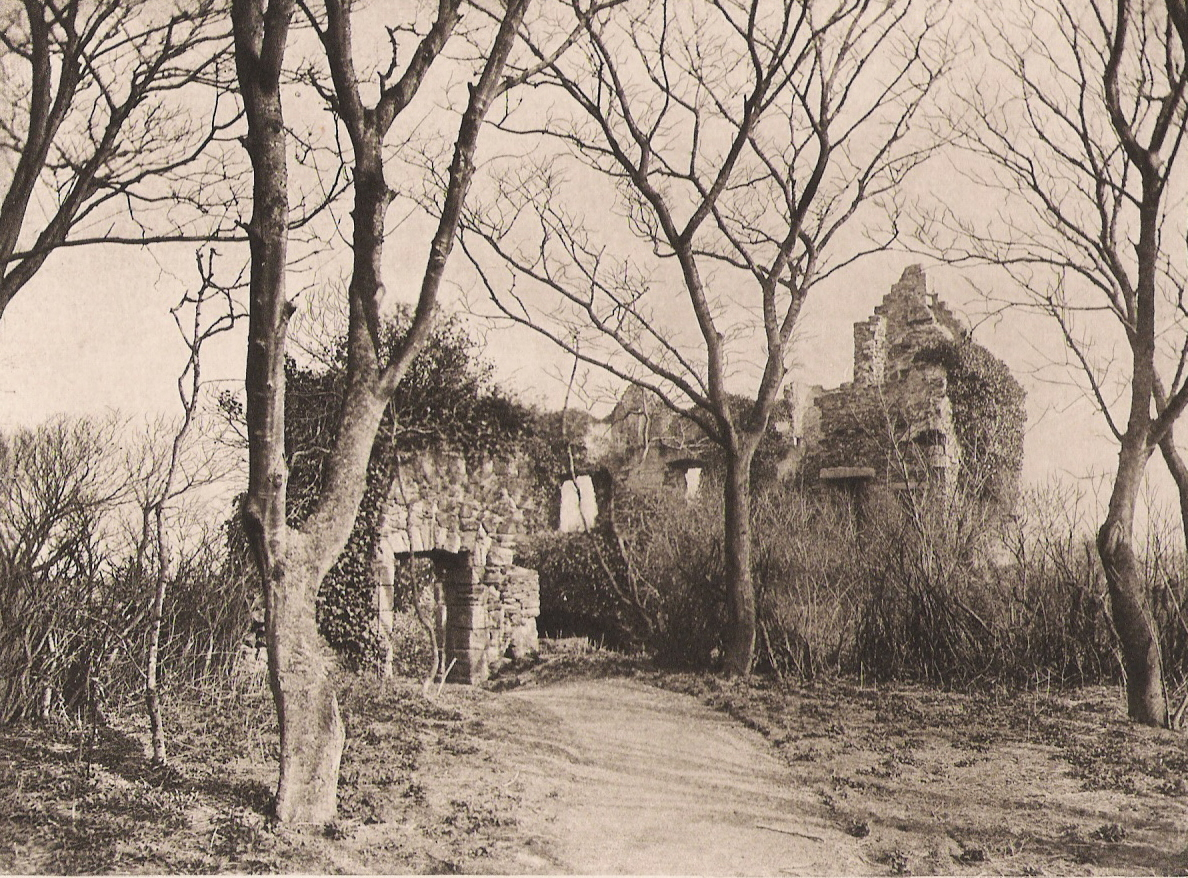
Auldhame Castle

It is said that the 8th-century Christian missionary Saint Baldred had one of his bases at Auldhame, and through his influence the parish of Auldhame had significant influence in the development of Christianity in Scotland. His name also lives on in St Baldred's Church and St Baldred's Road in North Berwick.

Following his death there was a dispute between the parishes of Auldhame, Tyninghame, and Prestonkirk, as to which should have his body. The story goes that by the advice of a Holy Man, they spent the night in prayer. In the morning three bodies were found, in all respects alike, each in its winding sheet, prepared for burial. To this day all three churches maintain Saint Baldred was buried within their walls.

In 2005 skeletal and archaeological remains, thought to be a church, were discovered in a field at Auldhame. Initial estimates that the church dated from the Medieval period were later proved wrong, and it was established that the find may even date from the time of Saint Baldred himself.

== History ==
In the 16th century Auldhame belonged to the Otterburn family: Scoughall belonged to the Auchmoutie family. In 1618 the poet John Taylor visited the Auchmouties and ate solan goose from the Bass from a buffet.

Sands at Scoughall were a hazard to shipping. In 1581 Margaret Hay, Lady Tyninghame, acquired two iron cannon from an English ship that had perished on the sands.

Gin Head is the site of a former Admiralty signals base constructed in 1943.

== Today ==
Today there is little in the area except farming. The houses at Auldhame and Scoughall are given little thought by those driving to North Berwick or visiting nearby Seacliff or Tantallon Castle. Indeed, such visitors are likely to be gazing towards the Bass Rock rather than considering the scattered houses and cottages at the roadside.

== Link to Robert Louis Stevenson ==
In 1919, John Robert Dale bought the estate of Seacliff, Scoughall and Auldhame after being tenant farmer of Scoughall since 1848, and Auldhame since 1834. The three estates remain to this day in the ownership of the Dale family. The novelist Robert Louis Stevenson was related to John Robert Dale and spent several boyhood holidays at Scoughall. It was here in front of the farmhouse fire that the young Stevenson first heard the story of how folks in these parts on dark stormy nights, when winds used to lash the coast, lured sailing ships onto the rocks by displaying misleading lantern lights.

The 'Pagans of Scoughall' had the worst of reputations. They were said to tie a horse's neck to its knee and attach a lantern to the rope, then drive the horse slowly along the cliffs, so that a vessel out at sea would think it a ship riding at anchor, and come in, only to be wrecked on the rocky reef known as the Great Car and be plundered. These tales gave Stevenson the idea for his story "The Wreckers". Robert Louis Stevenson also wrote in his novel Catriona (sequel to Kidnapped) of the 'lights of Scoughall' and purposely put 'Tam Dale' in charge of the prisoners on the Bass Rock.

== See also ==
- List of places in East Lothian
- Scougal (surname)
- Canty Bay
