= Whitekirk =

Coordinates: 56.0257°N 2.6486°W

- Location within Scotland
- OS grid reference: NT596815
- Council area: East Lothian Council
- Lieutenancy area: East Lothian
- Country: Scotland
- Sovereign state: United Kingdom
- Post town: Dunbar
- Postcode district: EH42
- Dialling code: 01620 870xxx
- Police: Scotland
- Fire: Scottish
- Ambulance: Scottish
- UK Parliament: East Lothian
- Scottish Parliament: East Lothian

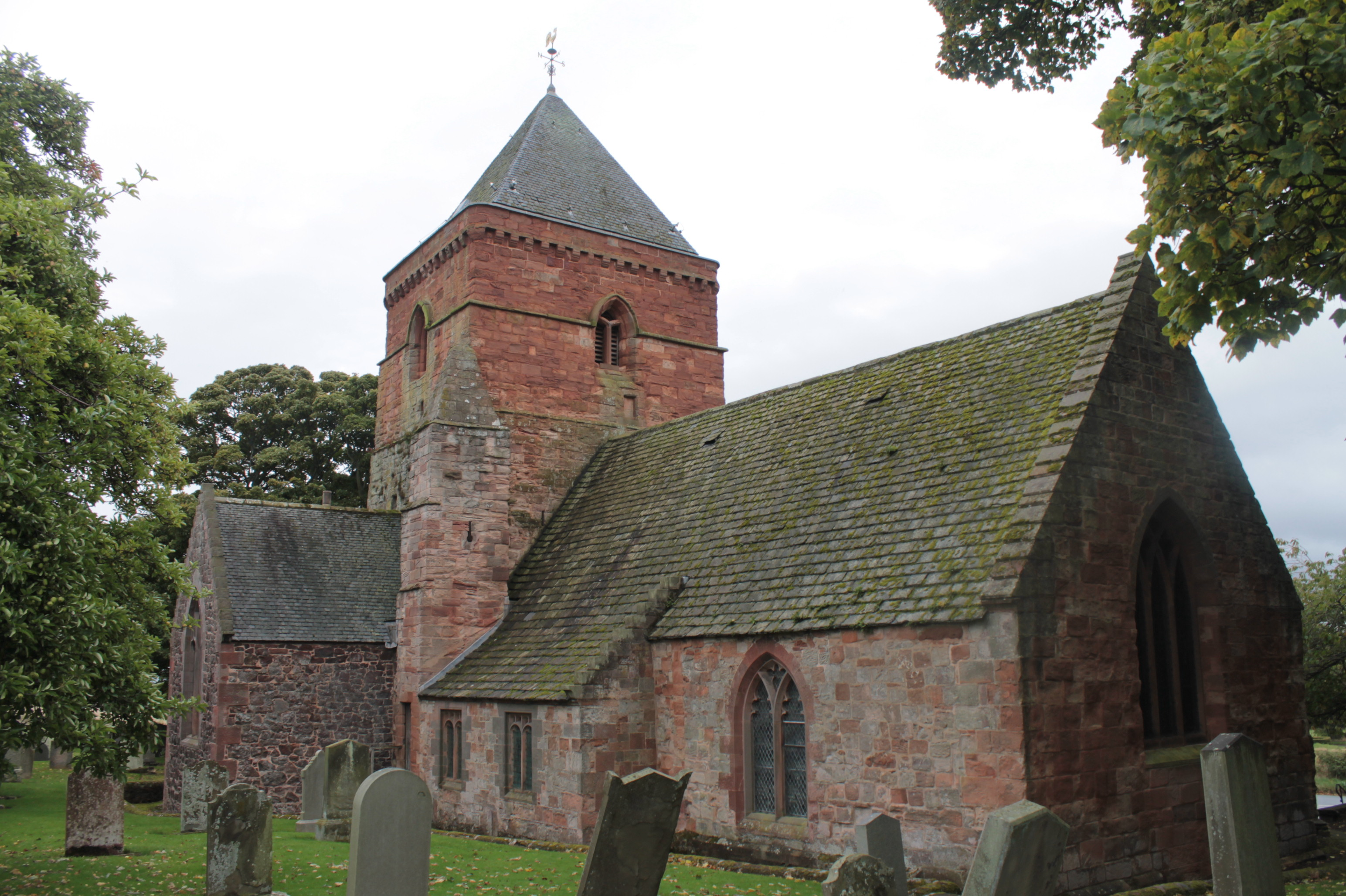
Whitekirk church

Whitekirk is a small settlement in East Lothian, Scotland. Together with the nearby settlement of Tyninghame, it gives its name to the parish of Whitekirk and Tyninghame.

== Whitekirk ==
Whitekirk is 4 mi (6.4 km) from North Berwick, 8 mi (13 km) from Dunbar and 25 mi (40 km) east of Edinburgh. A place of Christian worship from the earliest times and known in Old English: Hwīt Cirice, having a holy well, now lost, dedicated to St Mary the Virgin, and a famous statue, likewise dedicated and known as Our Lady of Haddington. It was on the pilgrim's route from St Andrews to Santiago de Compostela and described as a stopping point in the Iter pro peregrinis ad Compostellam., Book V of the Codex Calixtinus.

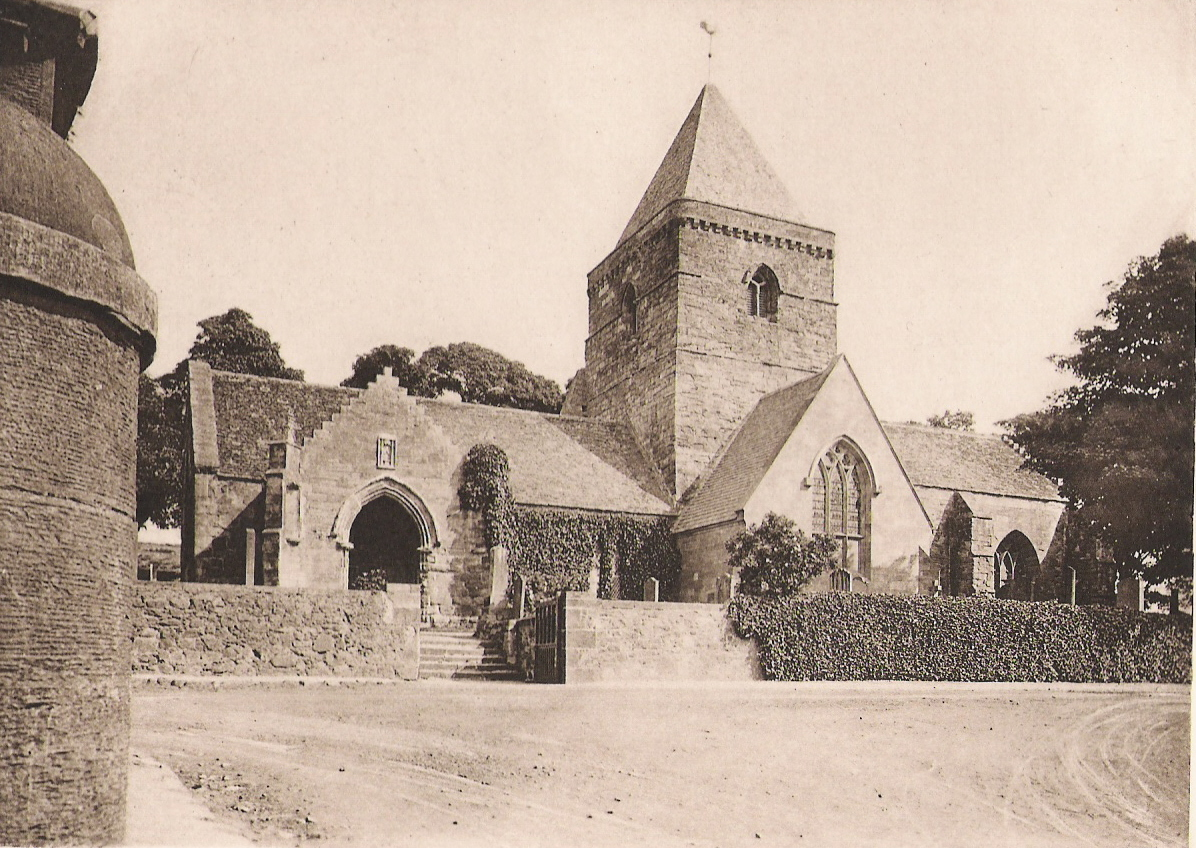
'The White Kirk' in 1893

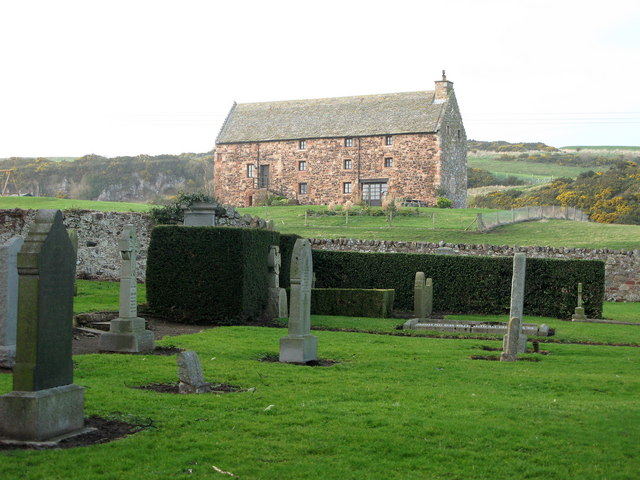
The tithe barn

The shrine of Our Lady at Whitekirk was desecrated by the armies of Edward III of England in 1356, a period that would become known as the Burnt Candlemas. Later in the 14th century, the shrine of Our Lady was reconsecrated at the newly built Church of St Mary the Virgin in Haddington. Whitekirk continued to be a place of pilgrimage, however, receiving visits from the future Pope Pius II and James IV, Margaret Tudor, and James V.

In early 1435 Aeneas Piccolomini (Pope Pius II) was travelling to Scotland on a diplomatic mission as Papal legate when his ship was beset by storms. After giving prayers to Our Lady, the ship and its crew made port safely at Dunbar, and having promised to walk barefoot to the nearest shrine to the virgin, Piccolomini set out for Whitekirk. The eight miles through the frozen countryside left him with rheumatism that he would complain about for the rest of his life.

James IV came to Whitekirk from Dunbar in May 1497, leaving money for poor folk and lepers. The Covenanting preacher John Blackadder gave his last conventicle on the hill behind the Church in 1678.

The building known as the tithe barn may have resulted from the rebuilding of the pilgrims' hostel in the 16th century. It has also been suggested that it formed a tower built by Oliver Sinclair before becoming a tithe barn in the 17th century. Information found within the parish church indicated that Abbot Crawford of Holyrood may have once owned it. Today it is a bed & breakfast.

The Holy Well dried up in the 19th century following agricultural drainage, but is thought to be located not far from the church building.

The current church was last restored in 2005–2006. Dramatic events in 1914 saw the church set on fire, allegedly by suffragette campaigners, although this has not been proved. The Kirk was restored by the office of Sir Robert Lorimer. Lorimer also designed the village war memorial in 1920.

Whitekirk derives its name from the original colour of the Kirk: white, and was once known as 'Hamer' or the greater Ham. The church is now the red of its underlying sandstone.

From 1806 to 1852 the minister of Whitekirk was the Rev James Wallace, who served as Moderator of the General Assembly in 1831/32, the highest position in the Church of Scotland. He lived in the manse which was built in 1796.

== Pilgrimage ==
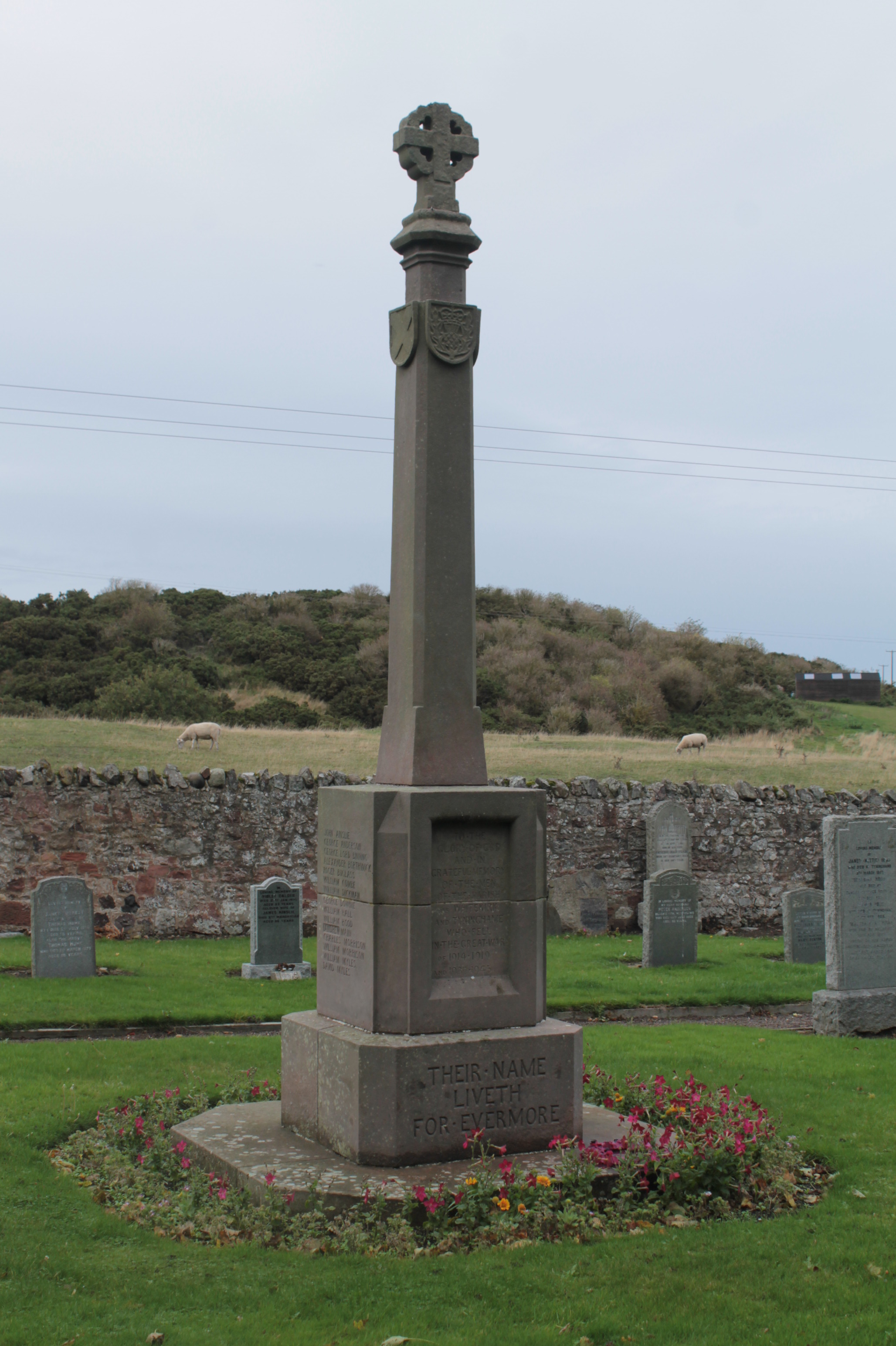
Whitekirk War Memorial

On the second Saturday of May, every year since 1971, there is an ecumenical pilgrimage that starts at Whitekirk and finishes in Haddington. Begun by Patrick Maitland the 17th Earl of Lauderdale, the numbers attending rose from 30 people in the early seventies to over 2,000; however, in 2008 the pilgrimage was cancelled due to lack of numbers.

== Notable residents ==
- John Watson Laidlay FRSE lived within the parish at Seacliff House, east of Tantallon Castle
- Peter Hately Waddell, minister of religion and author

== Notable burials ==
- Sir David Baird, 3rd Baronet (1832–1913)
- Sir David Baird, 4th Baronet (1865–1941)
- Sir Peter Burt (1944–2017)
- Sir Alistair Grant (1937–2001)
- Rev William Hamilton (d.1712)
- Very Rev Dr James Wallace (1770–1852)

== See also ==
- List of places in East Lothian
- Canty Bay

== Sources ==
F. H. Groome, Ordnance Gazetteer of Scotland. Edinburgh, 1883
