= Baldred of Tyninghame =

Northumbrian hermit and abbot

Saint Baldred of Tyninghame

Abbot and Confessor
- Born: Unknown
- Died: 6 March 757; Bass Rock, East Lothian
- Venerated in: Catholic Church; Anglicanism; Orthodox Church
- Major shrine: Tyninghame, later translated to Durham Cathedral (destroyed)
- Feast: 6 March

Balthere of Tyninghame (later Baldred) was a Northumbrian hermit and abbot, resident in East Lothian during the 8th century.

== Dating ==
According to Hovendeus the date of Baldred's death is given as 756. Symeon of Durham says "the twentieth year of King Eadberht of Northumbria" and Turgot of Durham "the seventeenth year of the episcopate of Cynulf", that is 756. As his feast is given as 6 March, by the modern calendar, this would be 6 March 757. Although the 8th-century date is now generally accepted, due to a passage in the 16th-century Aberdeen Breviary, he has, in the past, often been associated with the 6th-century saint, Kentigern.

== Life ==
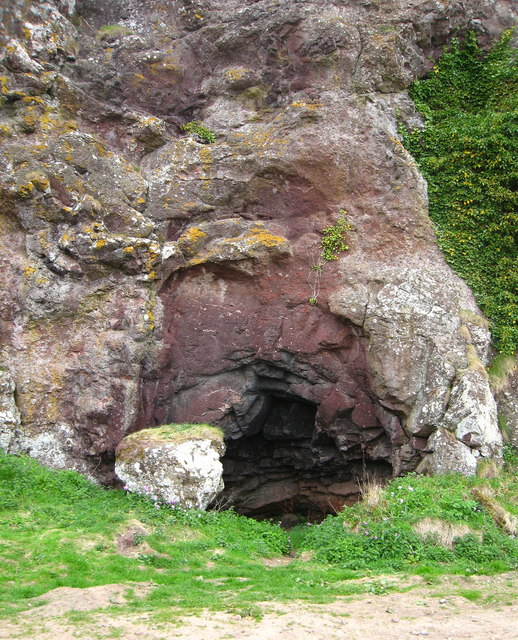
Baldred's Cave, Seacliff

Baldred is commonly referred to as "the Apostle of the Lothians" and Simeon of Durham says that "the boundaries of his pastorate embraced the whole land which belongs to the monastery of Saint Balther, which is called Tyninghame—from Lammermuir to Inveresk, or, as it was called, Eskmouthe." His cult was certainly centred on the four churches of Auldhame, Whitekirk, Tyninghame and Prestonkirk, between East Linton and North Berwick in East Lothian.

Baldred is believed to have founded a monastery at Tyninghame. However, at times, he preferred to retire from the spiritual government of the Lothian Britons and he selected the Bass Rock as the spot to build himself a small hermitage and associated chapel, although he also sometimes resided in 'St Baldred's Cave' on Seacliff Beach.

== Nationality ==
Baldred is said to have lived in the diocese of Lindisfarne, and was therefore a Northumbrian, a not improbable association since, at that time, the Lothians were a part of the kingdom of Northumbria. However, most sources assert an Irish connection. He was probably born in Ireland before joining the Northumbrian mission. Hector Boece says he exercised his office in a district which then formed a part of Pictland.

== Veneration ==
St Baldred's Chapel on the Bass Rock

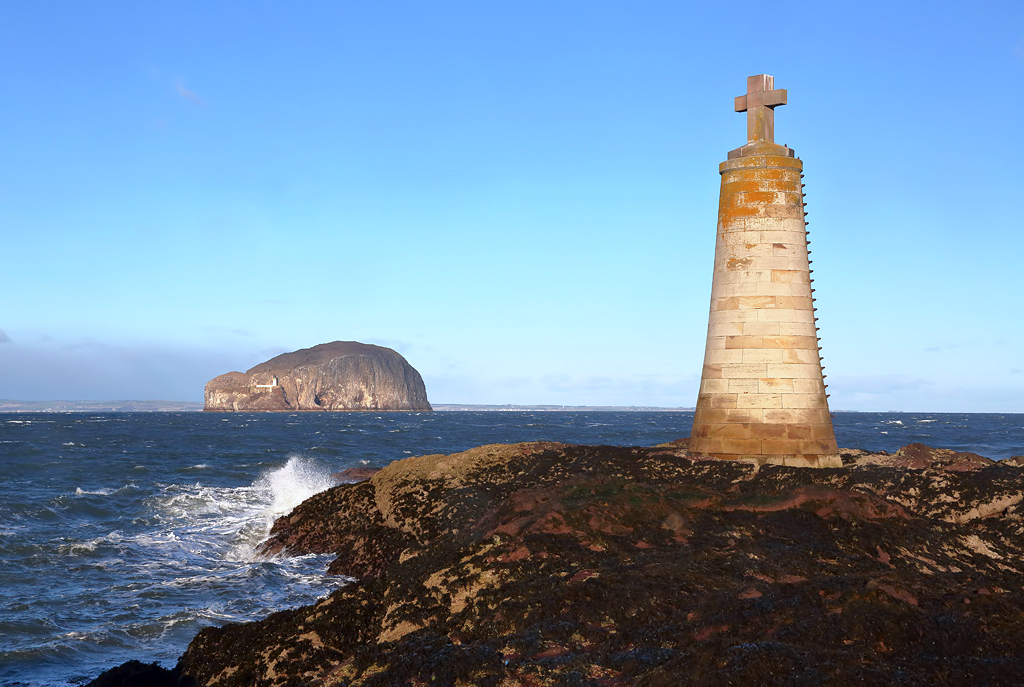
St Baldred's Cross with the Bass Rock beyond

About halfway up the Bass Rock are the ruins of an old chapel or, strictly speaking, the parish church of the Bass, said to mark the spot where Saint Baldred occupied his humble cell. The approximate date of the erection (or re-erection) of the chapel may be found in a papal bull dated 6 May 1493, mentioning this building as being then novita erecta. A further reconsecration (indicating more building work) took place in 1542 when the chapel was dedicated it to Saint Baldred.

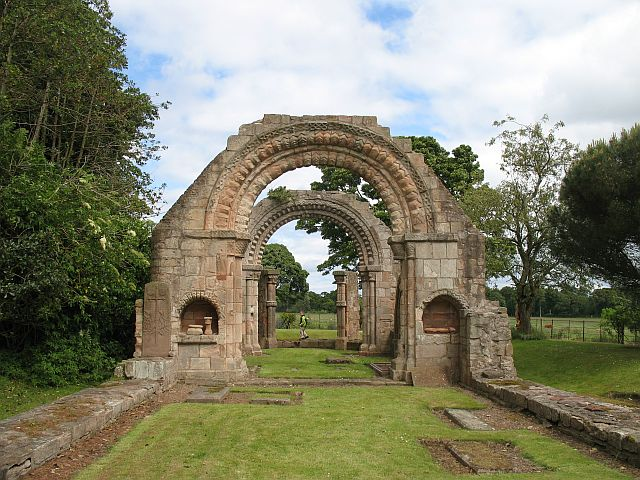
Ruins of St Baldred's Church in the grounds of Tyninghame House

Following Baldred's death on the site of this chapel, there was a dispute between the parishes of Auldhame, Tyninghame and Prestonkirk, as to which should have his body. The story goes that by the advice of a holy man, they spent the night in prayer. In the morning three bodies were found, in all respects alike, each in its winding sheet, prepared for burial. The story was probably invented to explain the claims of each church to house the shrine of Saint Baldred.

Lying in the grounds of Tyninghame House is the 12th-century St Baldred's Church. It traditionally stands on the site of his monastery which, according to the Melrose Chronicle, was eventually sacked by the Danes in 941. The Tyninghame body of Saint Baldred was removed to Durham Cathedral, by Alfred Westow, in the early 11th century. The church continued as the parish church until the village of Tyninghame was relocated to the west in 1761. Today, the ruins of church form little more than an architectural folly amongst the gardens of the house. At the Prestonkirk Parish Church there existed, until 1770, when it was damaged by a builder, a statue of the saint much venerated by the local population. St Baldred's Well stands nearby which was "famed for its ... healing qualities". Whitekirk parish church, celebrated in ancient times as a place of pilgrimage, also lays claim to this saint as the scene of his ministry, but A. E. Ritchie finds this doubtful.

In the calendar of saints of the Scottish Episcopal Church, Baldred is commemorated on 6 March. The Episcopalian church is North Berwick is dedicated to St Baldred.

== See also ==
- Baldred Bisset
- Baldred Rock
- Bryan Nelson who camped in the ruined chapel walls as he conducted ornithological studies on Bass Rock.
