= John Watson Laidlay =

Scottish merchant, numismatist and orientalist

John Watson Laidlay FRSE (1808–1885) was a Scottish merchant, numismatist and orientalist.

== Life ==
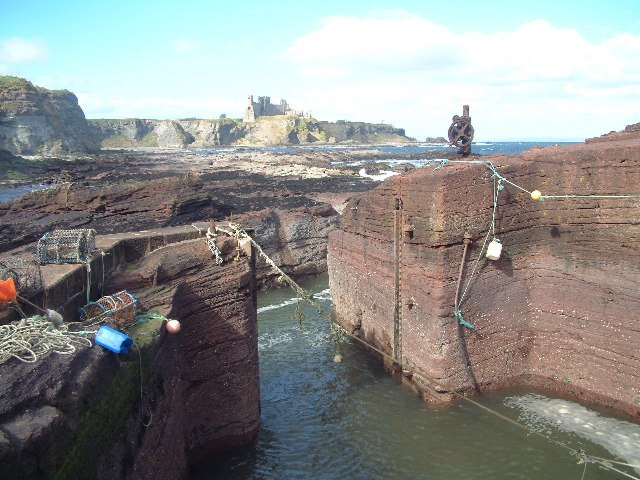
A view from Seacliff Harbour to Tantallon Castle

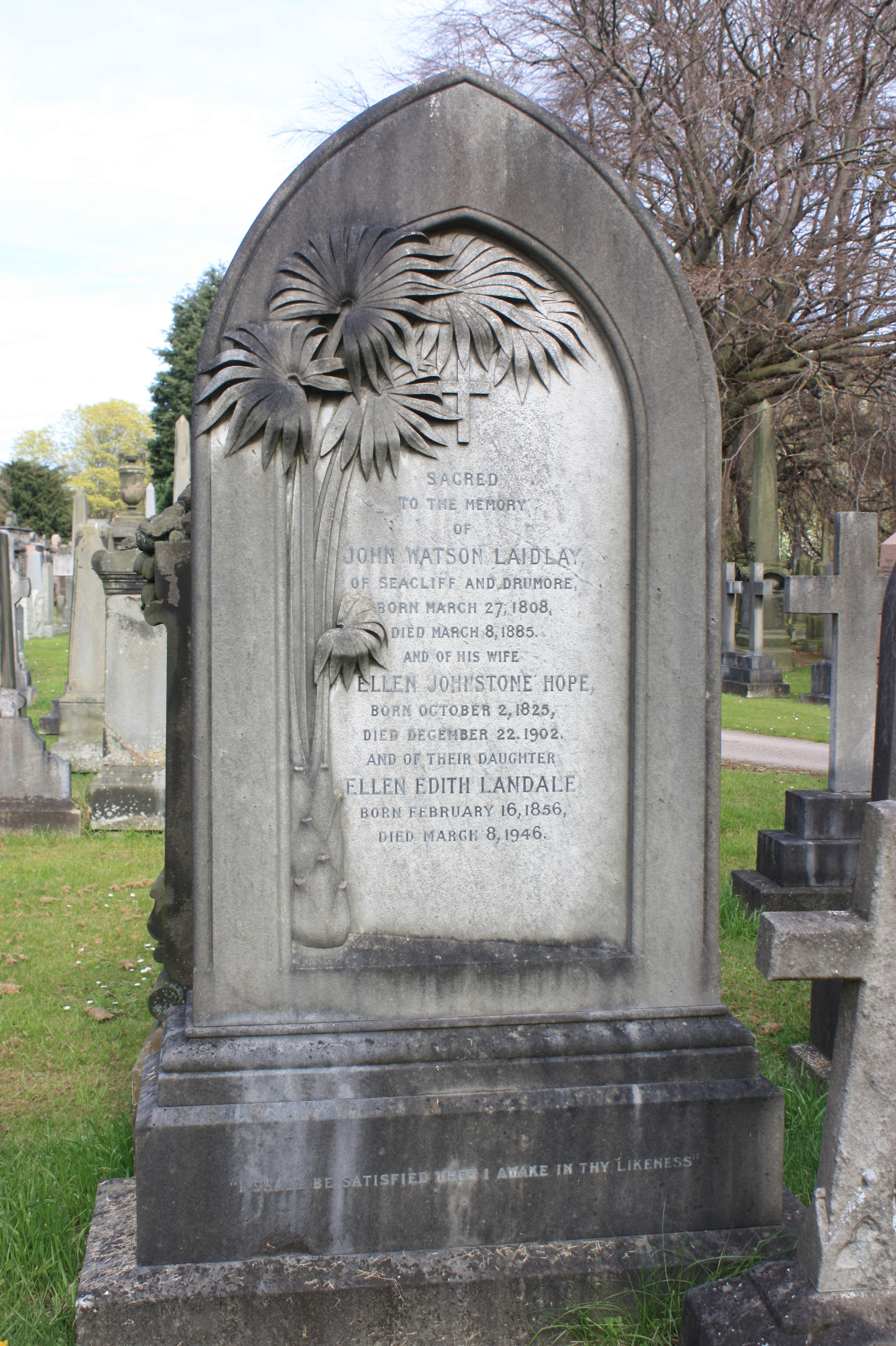
The grave of John Watson Laidlay, Dean Cemetery, Edinburgh

He was born on 27 March 1808 in Glasgow, the son of John Laidlay Esq. of Fleetwood in Lancashire. His father was a businessman who travelled extensively. His mother was sister to the bankers and merchants J. and R. Watson and it is likely that John Laidlay worked for the firm. Watsons owned extensive indigo plantations in Bengal.

He was educated at a private school in Blackheath, London. He then studied Chemistry under Michael Faraday. He also studied Hindustani under Dr Gilchrist in London and there was introduced to Bishop Reginald Heber. Having been suitably trained he was sent to India in 1825 to represent his uncles in their Indian companies. This also linked to other company interests in the East India Company. The two had silk and indigo factories in Behrampore, Rampore-Beauleah, Surdah etc. J. W. Laidlay oversaw these factories until 1841. In 1839 he took an extended trip to the Straits Settlements in Malaysia for health reasons. Here he befriended Sir James Brooke.

In 1841 he moved to Moorshedabad in north-east Bengal. Here he became more settled. In 1844 he married Ellen Johnstone Hope, daughter of William Hope of Duddingston in Edinburgh. Together they went to live in Calcutta. He had a great love of ancient languages and coins, specialising in India and the Middle East. He published articles in the Journal of the Bengal Asiatic Society.

He left India in 1849 and returned to Britain, living mainly in London. In 1854 he moved northwards to Scotland and settled at Seacliff House, a large property near North Berwick, east of Tantallon Castle with an impressive private harbour. Here he devoted himself to scientific study and private explorations and investigations. In these investigations he discovered a prehistoric cave near his house. In this period he also acquired the linked estates of Auldhame and Scoughall. In 1868 he was elected a Fellow of the Royal Society of Edinburgh, his proposer being Sir David Brewster.

He died on 8 March 1885. In his will he left a collection of shells to the British Museum. He is buried with his wife in Dean Cemetery in western Edinburgh. The grave lies in the north-west section of the original cemetery facing west onto the westmost path, close to the access gate to Dean Gallery.

== Works ==
- Bibliotheca Indica
- Faxian (1848), The Pilgrimage of Fa Hian from the French Edition of the Foe Koue Ki of MM. Remusat, Klaproth, and Landresse with Additional Notes and Illustrations, Calcutta: Baptist Mission Press.

== Family ==
He was married to Ellen Johnstone Hope (1825-1902). They had five sons and two daughters.

His eldest son, Andrew Laidlay, was born in Calcutta in 1845, qualified as an advocate in Britain and perished in a fire which destroyed Seacliff House in 1907. His second son, William James Laidlay was born in Calcutta in 1846 and became an advocate in Britain. Another son, John Ernest Laidlay (1860–1940), born in North Berwick, was a noted amateur golfer. His medals are held at the R&A World Golf Museum in St Andrews.
