= Alistair Grant =

British businessman (1937–2001)

Sir Matthew Alistair Grant FRSE (6 March 1937 – 22 January 2001) was a British businessman.

== Life ==
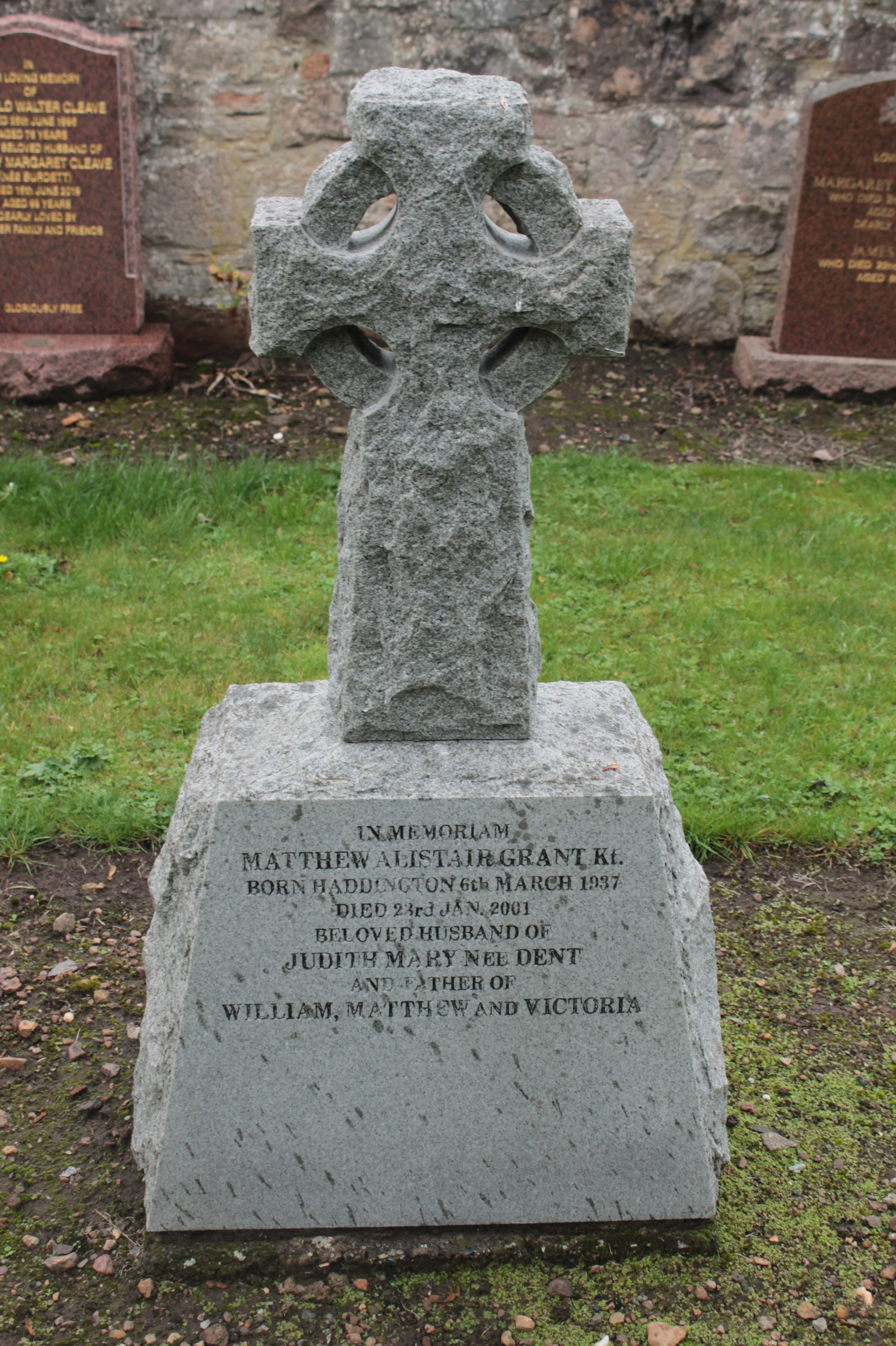
The grave of Sir Matthew Alistair Grant, Whitekirk churchyard

He was born in Haddington, East Lothian, the eldest of six children. His father was an RAF PE instructor and was initially educated at Knox Academy. The family moved to Bradford and he finished his education at Woodhouse Grove School in Yorkshire. He received a commission in the Royal Signal Corps whilst serving his National Service, with a view to thereafter go to Edinburgh University. However, he instead began as a management trainee for Unilever. His first position was at Batchelors pea and soup factory in Sheffield. In 1963 he moved to J Lyons & Co, then spent some time in advertising.

He then began working in the retail trade in the Argyll Group under James Gulliver and was evolved in the revival of the now extinct retail chain "Fine Fare". He rose to be Chief Executive of the Argyll Group from 1986 to 1998, including taking over the "Safeway" chain in 1987. He was knighted in the 1992 New Year Honours.

In 1986 the company made an unsuccessful but expensive bid to take over the Distillers' Company, but were beaten by their rival Guinness PLC. This brought an effective end to the career of Jimmy Gulliver but Grant went on to great success expanding Safeway to the point where it became the third largest retail chain in Scotland. He retired from Safeway and the Argyll Group in 1997 and then became chairman of Scottish & Newcastle 1997–2000.

He served as Governor of the Bank of Scotland from 1998 to 1999 when he was forced to resign due to ill-health.

In 1997 he was elected a Fellow of the Royal Society of Edinburgh. His proposers were Michael J Baker, Sir John Arbuthnott, John Spence and Neil Hood.

Grant lived in the library wing of Tyninghame House. He died of cancer on 22 January 2001 aged 63. He is buried close to Tyninghame, in Whitekirk churchyard, in the new cemetery north of the church.

== Family ==
In 1963 he married Judith Mary Dent. They had two sons, William and Matthew and one daughter, Victoria.
