= William Laidlay =

Scottish cricketer

Personal information
- Full name: William James Laidlay
- Born: 12 August 1846; Calcutta, Bengal Presidency, British India
- Died: 25 October 1912 (aged 66); Freshwater, Isle of Wight, England
- Batting: Unknown
- Bowling: Unknown

Career statistics
Competition	First-class
Matches	1
Runs scored	14
Batting average	7.00
100s/50s	–/–
Top score	11
Balls bowled	228
Wickets	3
Bowling average	35.00
5 wickets in innings	–
10 wickets in match	–
Best bowling	2/85
Catches/stumpings	–/–
- Source: Cricinfo, 12 September 2019

William James Laidlay (12 August 1846 – 25 October 1912) was a Scottish first-class cricketer, barrister and artist.

The son of John Watson Laidlay, he was born in August 1846 at Calcutta in British India. He was educated in Scotland at the Loretto School, before going up to Peterhouse, Cambridge, from where he graduated in 1872. A student of the Middle Temple, he was called to the bar in April 1875. In the same year that he was called to the bar, He was a member of the Faculty of Advocates in 1874 and served on the Scottish courts circuit until 1878, after which he studied art in Paris from 1879–85. Laidlay was a founding member of the New English Art Club in 1885. He regularly exhibited his works at the Royal Academy of Arts, the Paris Salon, and the New Gallery. Laidlay died in October 1912 at Glenbrook House in Freshwater on the Isle of Wight. His brother was the amateur golfer, Johnny Laidlay.

== Cricket ==
Laidlay made a single appearance in first-class cricket for the North in the North v South fixture at Chelsea. Batting twice in the match, he was dismissed for 11 runs by James Lillywhite in the North's first-innings, while in their second-innings he was dismissed for 3 runs by W. G. Grace. He took three wickets across the match, dismissing Grace and Charles Buller in the South's first-innings, while in their second-innings he dismissed George Wyatt.
