= Henry Thomas Pringuer =

Dr. Henry Thomas Pringuer DMus(Oxon), BMus(Oxon), FCO (23 February 1852 – 26 October 1930) was an English composer, organist, and one of the first examiners for Trinity College, London.

Pringuer became Organist and Master of the Choir at St. Dunstan's, Canterbury in 1866 at the age of 14. He then served at St. Matthew's Parish Church Redhill and then for 40 years at St. Mary's Parish Church Stoke Newington until his retirement due to ill-health in 1919. He subsequently went on to become organist at All Saints Lindfield.

== Early life (1852–1869) ==
Henry Thomas Pringuer was born on 23 February 1852 at St. Peter's Place, Canterbury. His parents were Samuel Freemoult Pringuer (1828–1907), a cabinet maker of Canterbury, Kent; and Eliza Hayward (1825–1902) of Blean, Kent. It is likely that the Pringuer family were Walloon refugees, many of whom settled in the Canterbury area. A good portion of the Pringuer family also worshipped in Bethnal Green and Spitalfields, both often considered hubs of Walloon settlements. In 1861, at the age of just nine and a half, Pringuer was appointed organist of a chapel in Canterbury and in 1864, moved to All Saints' Church. Shortly after, he attained the coveted post of organist at St. Dunstan's. His tutors in Canterbury included Thomas Goulden FCO and Dr. William Henry Longhurst DMus. Goulden came from a large family of musicians who owned the Goulden's shop in Canterbury, which at one time sold pianofortes, American organs and gramophones. Dr. Longhurst was organist of Canterbury Cathedral and was connected with the music there for 71 years. Pringuer was a chorister at the Cathedral before the age of 14, and in both 1911 and 1914, he attended the Cathedral Choristers' Association Reunion.

== St. Matthew's, Redhill (1869–1879) ==
In February 1869, Pringuer was appointed as organist of Emmanuel Church, Sidlow, Reigate, and choirmaster at the Church of St. John the Evangelist, Redhill. On the retirement of the organist at St. Matthew's, Redhill, Pringuer was unanimously elected to the post. In 1871, he formed the Redhill Harmonic Society, and went on to direct choir and orchestra in many performances where works included The Messiah, The Creation, Elijah, St. Paul, Mass in C minor K.258, The Woman of Samaria and Faust. The inaugural concert took place in March 1872. Judas Maccabaeus was performed by a band and chorus of 113 performers, Pringuer being congratulated "on having brought the members of the society to such a great pitch of excellence as that displayed by them on this occasion".

Pringuer married his first wife, Julia Griffin on 4 September 1872 at St. Saviour's, Pimlico; she was the daughter of David Griffin, an engineer. Julia brought with her to the marriage, a daughter Beatrice Maud Griffin, born out of wedlock in 1871. On his marriage, the people of Redhill presented the couple with a black marble clock; and to Pringuer they gave two volumes of organ music and a carved ivory baton mounted in gold.

Pringuer was appointed Fellow of the College of Organists (FCO) on 30 January 1877. The examination which was conducted by Charles Joseph Frost and C. Warwick Jordan included four separate elements: organ playing, harmony, counterpoint and general knowledge of music. On 25 October in the same year he gained the degree of Bachelor of Music from New College, Oxford. The examiners were Sir Frederick Arthur Gore-Ouseley Bart. (Heather Professor of Music), Charles William Corfe (organist of Christ Church, and the Choragus) and Leighton George Hayne (organist of Queen's College, Oxford). The first examination was held in the Hilary term and the second in the Michaelmas term. Candidates for the BMus were required to summit a composition in five-part harmony with at least five stringed instruments to which no more than four wind instruments could be added. Dr. Pringuer's setting was of Psalm 107 and was scored for flute, clarinet, violin, SATTB and double bass. It was performed by the Redhill Harmonic Society, and was "well-received".

One of Dr. Pringuer's first composition was titled Queen Bess's Solemne Daunce. Originally a piano solo, by special request, it was rescored for orchestra for the Covent Garden Promenade Concerts. Other piano pieces included Holiday Time and Evening on the Lake; and an orchestral march Invicta which has not survived.

Whilst in Redhill, in conjunction with Robert Hesketh, Pringuer founded the St. John's Amateur Musical Society who met occasionally to rehearse and perform orchestral works. Towards the end of his time in Redhill, Pringuer was also appointed to the post of music-master at Reigate Grammar School; however, the locals were well aware of the musical limitations of the local area, saying in 1879 Pringuer was "a musician of no mean capacity, whose early achievements foreshadow an honourable and prosperous professional career...Mr. Pringuer is far too young to have exhausted his opportunities".

== St. Mary's, Stoke Newington (1879–1919) ==
Dr. Pringuer's DMus hood; despite its age, the cherry pink hasn't faded at all

Pringuer was appointed organist at St. Mary's, Stoke Newington in 1879. He remained there for 40 years, and during that time, he served under four rectors: Rev. Thomas Jackson, Preb. Leonard Shelford, Rev. W. Bryant Salmon and Preb. Patrick Cromie. During his time at the church, the choir became renowned throughout London, and the St. Mary's Choir dinners were considered the 'event of the year' in North London church life.

In 1885, Pringuer was examined for, and passed the DMus, again at New College, Oxford. The examination was conducted two eminent musicians in the form of composer Charles Hubert Hastings Parry and Sir. John Frederick Bridge (Organist and Master of the Choristers at Westminster Abbey). The requirements were for a public performance of a piece of vocal music of eight parts with accompaniment for full orchestra. Pringuer composed a setting of Psalm 48 "Great is the Lord", and it was performed at the Sheldonian Theatre, Oxford, on 16 October 1885. The text was taken from the Book of Common Prayer with the final verse being paraphrased by James Matthews and being sung to the melody of the Old Hundredth.

Dr. Pringuer's native Canterbury were always ready to welcome him back, recognising in him "a young and gifted citizen who is making a distinguished position in the musical world" and he continued to give organ recitals in the city for many years. One such recital on 15 September 1886 included works by Henry Smart, Gustav Merkel, Alexandre Guilmant, J.S. Bach, William Sterndale Bennett and Louis Spohr. Also included was his own composition Evening on the Lake, subtitled Andante in G major. Another recital included a piece titled 'March of the Kings', and is listed as being from Pringuer's Oxford Cantata, though no details of this work are known. Newspaper reports described his performances as "much admired" and "exceedingly effective".

Pringuer married his second wife, Agnes Sarah Carter at the Parish Church of St. Andrew, Stoke Newington on 26 November 1892. Baptised on 12 July 1857 at St. Peter's, Walworth, she was the daughter of William Carter, a bank clerk of Tottenham, London, and his wife Hannah Hierous of Streatham, Surrey.

Towards the end of the century, Pringuer remained much in demand as a recitalist. Recital venues included St. Stephen's, Walbrook and St. Peter-upon-Cornhill. Later recitals afforded opportunities for Pringuer to accompany a selection of vocalists, including Florence Oliver and Mrs. Harvey Thomas, in works by Sullivan, Mendelssohn and Rossini.

Around 1907, Pringuer penned the plans for a new organ to be built by Hill & Son. It turned out to be a large organ with four manuals, and was seen in its day to be the 'Rolls-Royce' of instruments.

Sadly, at the age of 56, Dr. Pringuer's second wife Agnes died on 18 November 1913 at Stamford Hill, London. The impressively named Dr. Theophelus Hoskim MRCS certified the death from cirrhosis of the liver.

Just over 10 months after Agnes' death, Pringuer married his third wife, Florence Mildred Saltmarsh Challen, niece of the artist and painter of Mary Seacole, Albert Challen. Daughter of a land surveyor George Trimnell Challen of Islington, London and his wife Julia Pontifex, Henry and Mildred were married at The Cathedral Church of Christ, Canterbury, on 3 September 1914.

== All Saints, Lindfield (1919–1930) ==
After a period of recuperation, possibly at Sidmouth, Devon, Pringuer was appointed organist in the small parish church of All Saints, Lindfield, West Sussex.

On 26 October 1930, Pringuer was in the vestry preparing for the evening service at All Saints, Lindfield. The Vicar, Rev. Sidney Swann MA had just congratulated Pringuer on his rendering of the hymn 'When morning gilds the skies' at the morning service, and then while talking to a choirboy, Pringuer suddenly collapsed. Dr. Christopher William Lumley Dodd MRCS LRCP was summoned, but was only able to pronounce life to be extinct. The body was taken to Dr. Pringuer's home at Priory Cottage, and speaking at the service afterwards, Rev. Swann said that in the death, the parish had sustained a "great loss" although there was "some consolation in the fact that Pringuer had died as he would have wished to die – in his cassock, ready to go to the organ he loved so well".

Dr. Pringuer's funeral took place on 30 October 1930 leaving the residence at 'The Priory', Lindfield for an impressive choral service at the parish church, and then burial at Horsted Keynes. There was "universal mourning", the event casting "a gloom over the whole hamlet"

== Legacy ==
In 1934, money was raised to erect a memorial tablet to Dr. Pringuer's memory. The tablet costing £30 was made of Hopton Wood Stone with a blue glass mosaic border, and reads "Remember Henry Thomas Pringuer Mus.Doc.Oxon. F.R.C.O. 23 Feb.1852-26 Oct.1930 Organist and Master of the Choir in this Church at the age of 14 afterwards at St. Matthew's Church Redhill and for 40 years at St. Mary's Parish Church Stoke Newington His great gifts were devoted to the service of GOD in His Church "unto death" M.S.P. 3 September 1934". The tablet is situated on the north face of the large south-facing pier at the entrance to the Choir at St. Dunstan's Church, Canterbury.

== List of works ==
- Evening on the Lake a barcarolle for piano (pub. London, 1876) (also arranged for organ and subtitled Andante in G major)
- Queen Bess's Solemn Daunce for piano (pub. London, 1875)
- Invicta a march for orchestra (date unknown, c.1875)
- A Recollection of Old London for orchestra (pub. London, 1876) (rescored from Queen Bess's Solemn Daunce)
- The Message of the Wind a song (1876)
- Psalm 107 'O give thanks unto the Lord' for flute, clarinet, violin, SATTB and double bass (unpub. 1877)
- Holiday Time a sketch for the piano (pub. London, 1878)
- Psalm 48 'Great is the Lord' for orchestra and SSAATTBB (unpub. 1885)
- Guinevere a comic opera (unpub. 1889) (subtitled Love Laughs at Law)
- Original Compositions for Organ The Minster Voluntaries Book III (pub. 1892)
- The Hicks-Beach Masonic Musical Service for the three Degrees of Craft Masonry (contributor) (pub. Spencer & Co., London, 1901)
- In the Virgin's Arms a carol-anthem for SATB and organ (pub. Vincent Music Co., London, 1909)
- Benedictus in A flat (pub. Novello & Co., London, 1910)
- Te Deum Laudamus in A flat for choir and organ (pub. Novello & Co., London, 1910)
- Oxford Cantata (date and details unknown)
