= Seacliff =

Area of East Lothian, Scotland

Coordinates: 56.0518°N 2.6350°W

An aerial view of Seacliff beach

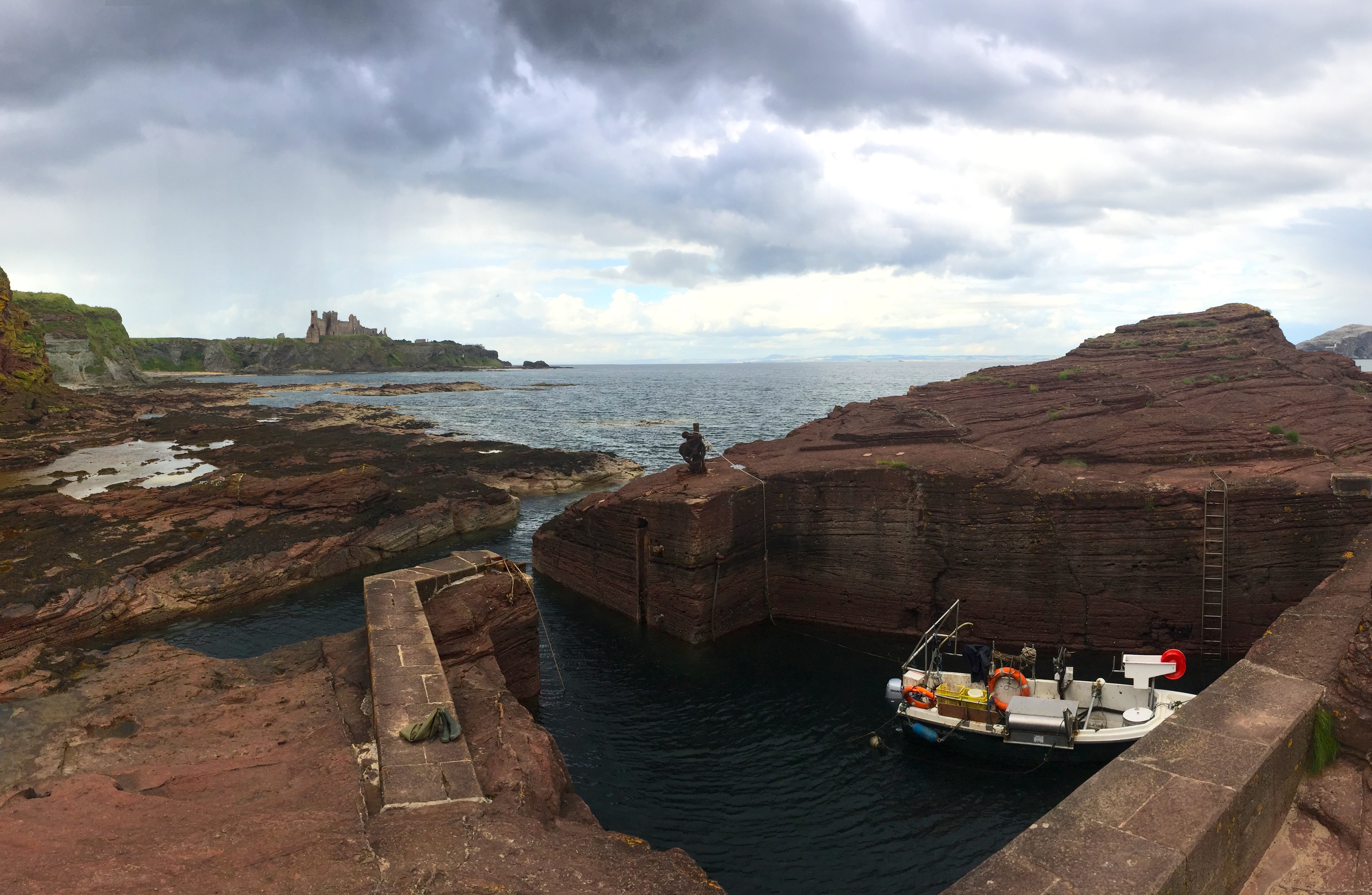
A view from Seacliff Harbour to Tantallon Castle

Seacliff comprises a beach, an estate and a harbour. It lies 4 miles (6 kilometres) east of North Berwick, East Lothian, Scotland.

== History ==
The beach and estate command a strategic position at the mouth of the Firth of Forth, and control of the area has been contested through the ages. The beach and estate were used as a staging post for various raids on nearby Tantallon Castle from the 14th to the 17th century. Troops were also stationed here to prevent landings by the French during the Napoleonic Wars in 1798. Before bloodshed touched the area, the 8th century Christian missionary Saint Baldred was based in nearby Scoughall, and several features of the area have been named after him, such as "Ghegan Rock" (Churchman's Haven).

In quieter times, the ownership of the estate has changed hands on several occasions. Seacliff House was built in 1750 by Robert Colt. It was later bought by George Sligo who in 1841 employed the famous Scottish architect David Bryce to build a new house in baronial style on the core of the older house. From 1854 until 1885 the house was owned by the orientalist John Watson Laidlay and he lived here with his family including Johnny Laidlay.

An aerial view of The Gegan, Seacliff

In 1907 the house was gutted by fire, killing the owner, Andrew Laidlay. Although plans were drawn up by Robert Lorimer for its restoration in 1911 these were never carried out.

The exterior survives almost complete with gables, turrets and bartizans. The outbuildings were later purchased by the Royal Navy who established a top-secret research base there during World War I. The station, known as HMS Scottish Seacliff, was mainly used for navigation training and U-Boat defence.

Robert Louis Stevenson was related to the Dale family, who still own and farm much of the land around Seacliff today.

== Modern day ==
The area is largely unspoiled and attracts surfers, dog-walkers, riders and summer picnickers.

Seacliff Harbour is a sheltered spot accessible through a narrow channel, all blasted out of the red sandstone cliffs. This was constructed in 1890 by Andrew Laidlay, the then laird, who used a steam engine and compressed air to cut the stone. It was once home to boats owned by fishermen and landowners but today it is rarely used by boats and more for diving and dive training. The entrance measures just three metres across and it is the smallest harbour in the UK.

The estate is home to farming, the Seacliff Haulage depot and a small number of cottages.

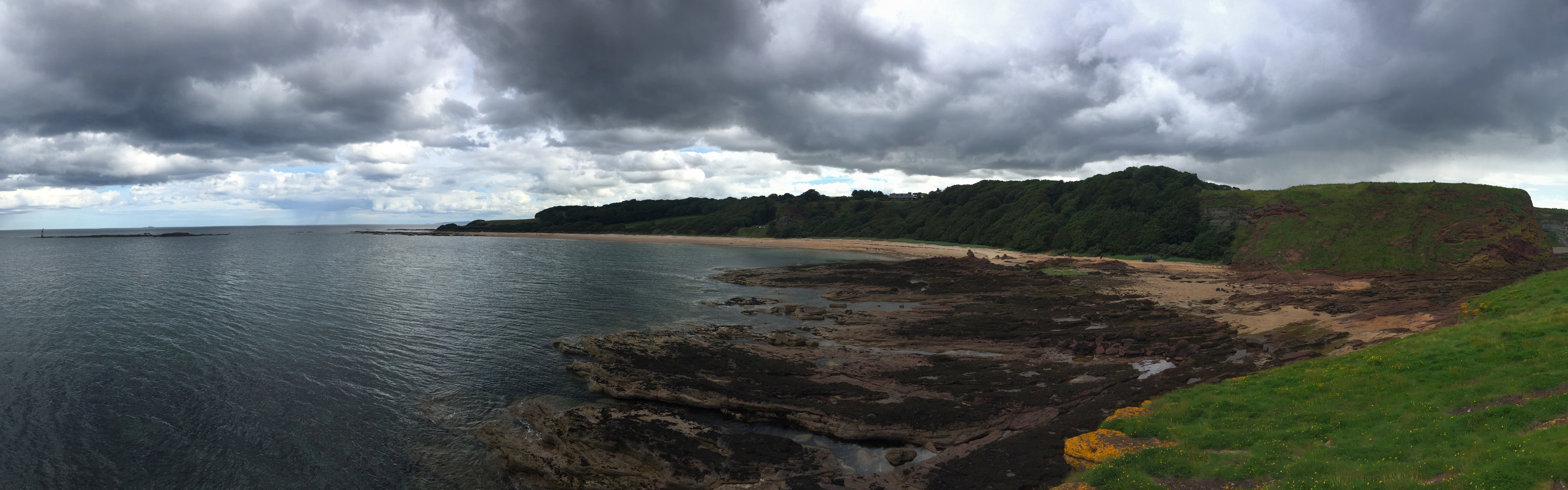
Panorama of Seacliff Beach, taken from The Gegan

== See also ==
- List of places in East Lothian
- Canty Bay
