= Tyninghame =

Coordinates: 56.0028°N 2.6264°W

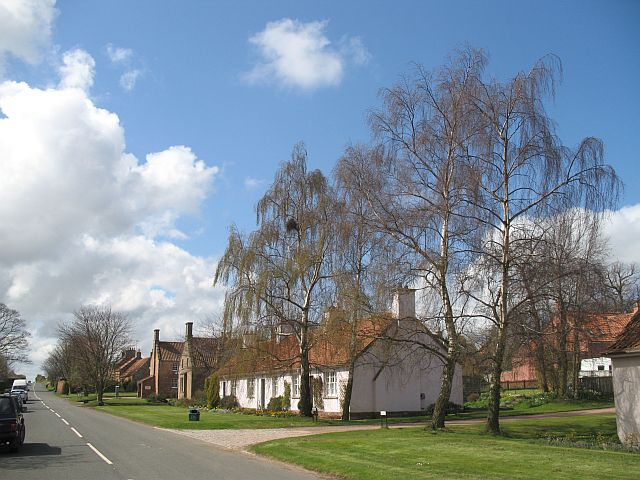

- Location within Scotland
- OS grid reference: NT610791
- Council area: East Lothian Council
- Lieutenancy area: East Lothian
- Country: Scotland
- Sovereign state: United Kingdom
- Post town: DUNBAR
- Postcode district: EH42
- Dialling code: 01620 870xxx
- Police: Scotland
- Fire: Scottish
- Ambulance: Scottish
- UK Parliament: East Lothian
- Scottish Parliament: East Lothian

Tyninghame (TIN-ing-um) is a small settlement in East Lothian, Scotland, about two miles north-east of East Linton. Together with the nearby settlement of Whitekirk, it gives its name to the parish of Whitekirk and Tyninghame.

== Tyninghame ==
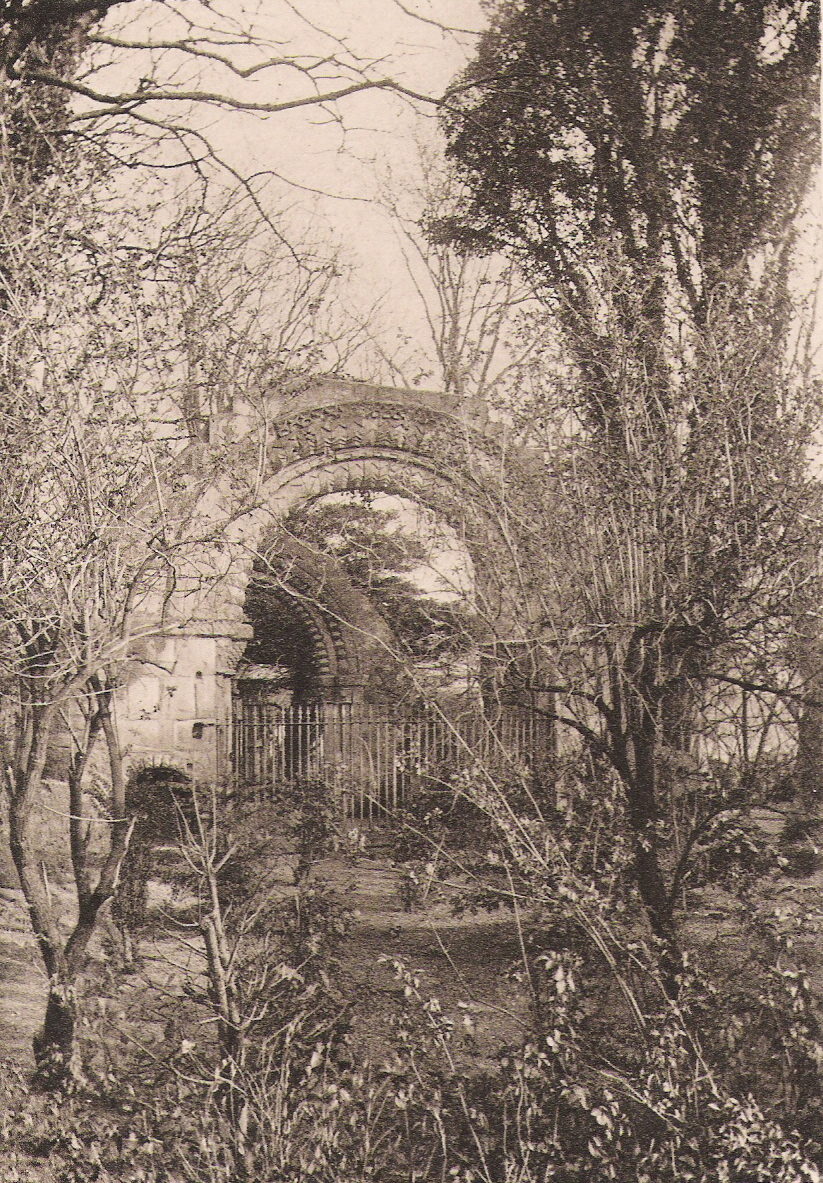
Ruins of Tyninghame Kirk

Tyninghame is an ancient parish that was joined to Whitekirk in 1761. The name is Northumbrian Old English: Tinangehām, and means Hamlet on the Tyne. The original church at Tyninghame was founded by Saint Baldred an Anchorite described as the "Apostle of the Lothians". In 941 AD, the church and village of Tyninghame was destroyed by Anlaf the Dane. Records of early priests here are scarce. However, in 1342 Peter de Vetericampo resigned as the Rector of Tyninghame, and was replaced by Patrick de Lochris, with the blessing of King David & Queen Joan.

The oldest extant land records give the superiors of Tyninghame as the Archdiocese of Saint Andrews, doubtless because of its connections with Saint Baldred. From at least the end of the 11th century the lands were occupied by hereditary feu by the Lauder of The Bass family. In June 1617 the Lauders are recorded as being the patrons of the church there, and the Session Book records that they provided for the new sacramental vessels for communion that year: "Suma of money to be payit be the Ladie Bass, six scor pundis, ane pund, five s." Relations between The Church and the local patrons were not always good and it is recorded on 4 February 1621, that a fine was paid: "Given be the Ladie Bass for penaltie of her servand quha brak ye Sabbothe, 18s". In 1628 the Tyninghame manor and estate was sold to the Earl of Haddington.

In 1761 the Earl of Haddington moved Tyninghame village from its original position, to the west of the policies of Tyninghame House to make way for landscaped parkland.

=== Tyninghame House ===
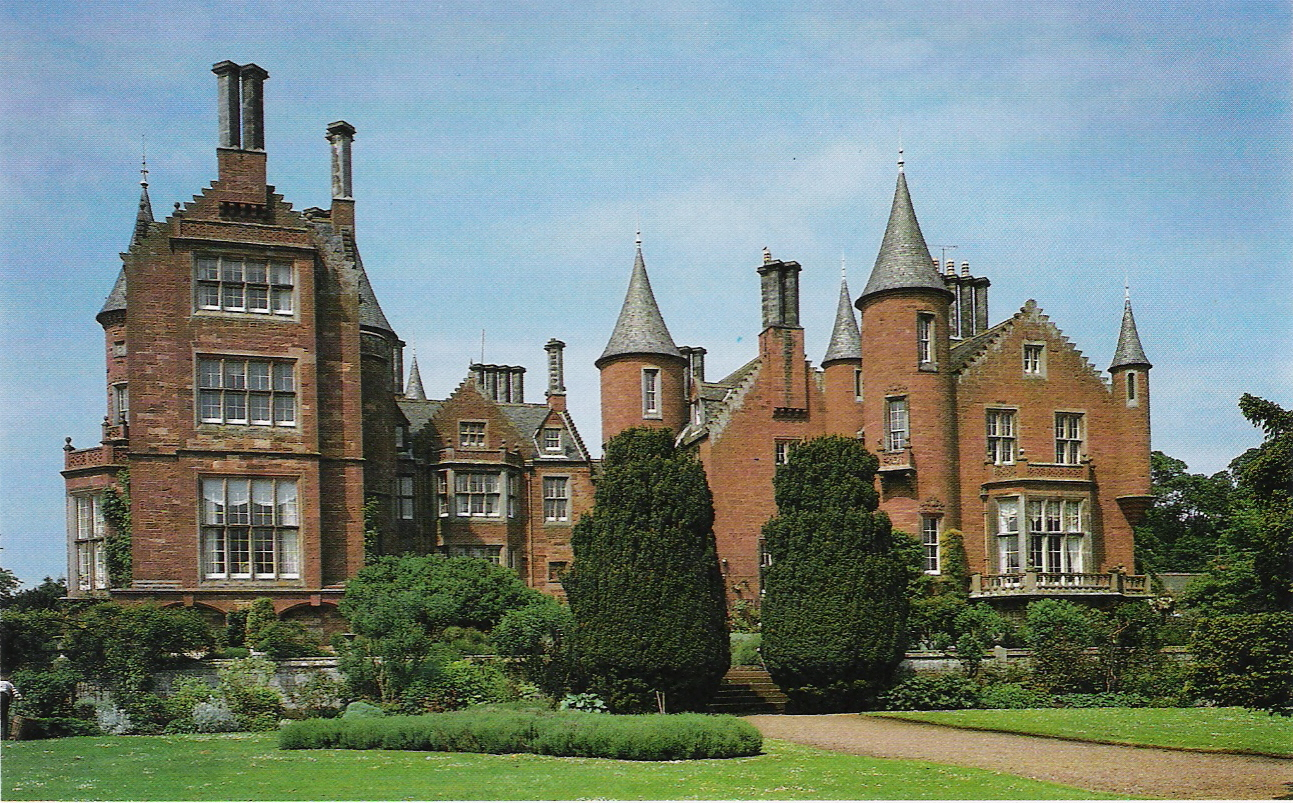
Tyninghame House

Tyninghame House, a category A-listed building, is located to the east of the village by the estuary of the River Tyne. It lies adjacent to the site of the original village, and within the gardens can be seen the remains of St Baldred's Church. There was a manor at Tyninghame in 1094, and even then it was held by the Lauder of The Bass family. In 1617 Isabella Hepburn, Lady Bass, (widow of Sir George Lauder of the Bass), made additions to it. In the 17th century it was sold to the Earl of Haddington. The present building dates from 1829 when the 9th Earl of Haddington employed William Burn to greatly enlarge the house in the Baronial style. In 1987 the contents of the house were sold, and the house was divided into flats.

== See also ==
- List of places in East Lothian
- Canty Bay
