= Canty Bay =

Inlet and hamlet in Scotland

Coordinates: 56.057°N 2.665°W

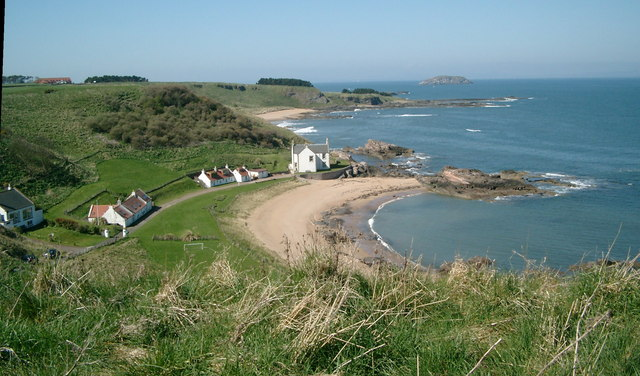
- The hamlet of Canty Bay

- Location within Scotland
- OS grid reference: NT585850
- Civil parish: North Berwick
- Council area: East Lothian Council
- Lieutenancy area: East Lothian
- Country: Scotland
- Sovereign state: United Kingdom
- Post town: NORTH BERWICK
- Postcode district: EH39
- Dialling code: 01620
- Police: Scotland
- Fire: Scottish
- Ambulance: Scottish
- UK Parliament: East Lothian
- Scottish Parliament: East Lothian

Canty Bay is a small inlet and coastal hamlet on the northern coast of East Lothian, Scotland. It is 2 miles (3.2 km) east of North Berwick and is opposite the Bass Rock and Tantallon Castle. Other settlements nearby include Auldhame, Scoughall, Seacliff, and the Peffer Sands. Canty Bay means "bay of the little head" from the Gaelic ceanntan, diminutive of ceann.

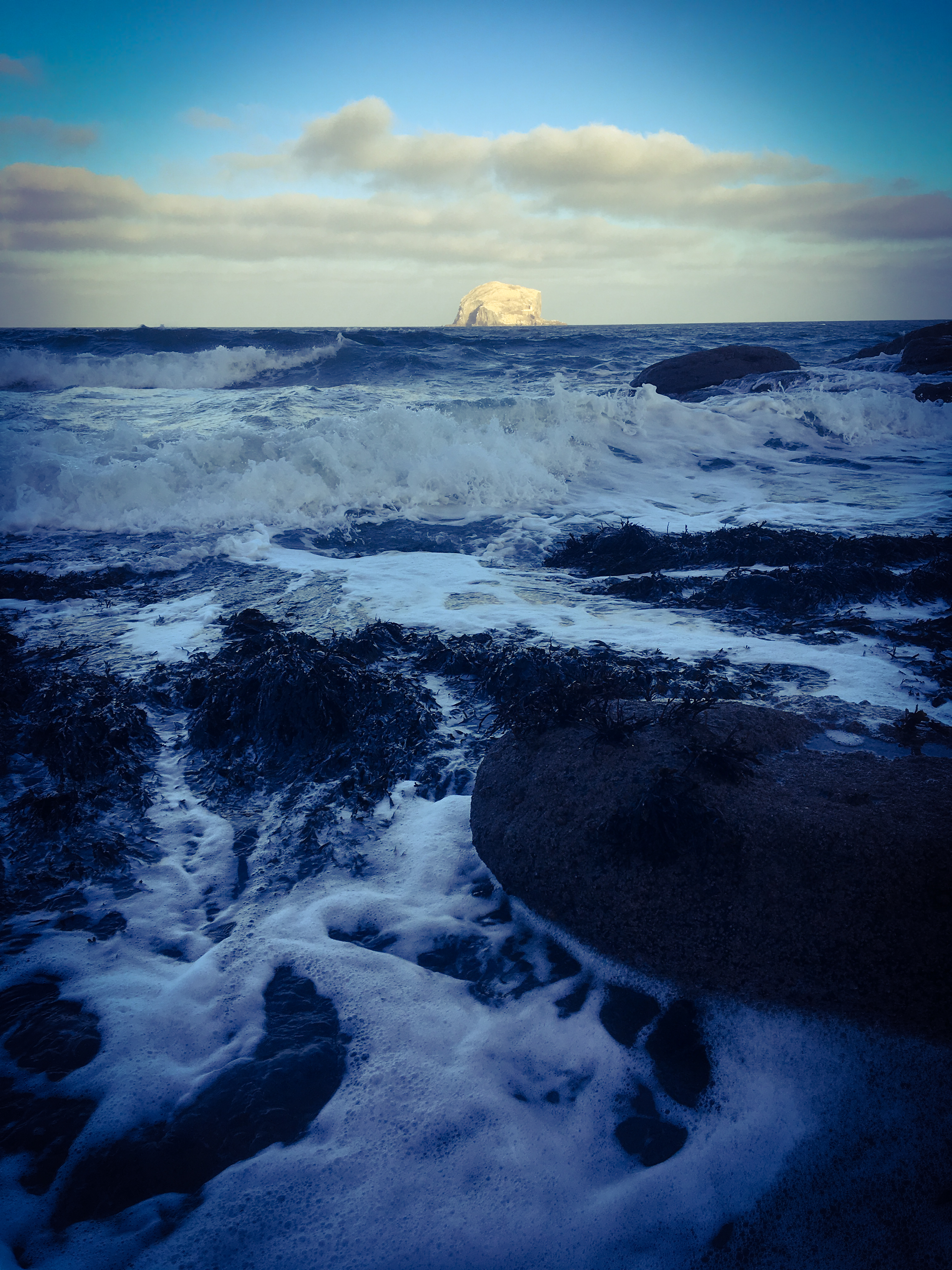
Bass Rock from Canty Bay

The Glen Golf Club is close to its western side, and to the east there are high coastal cliffs. There are two beaches separated by a rocky headland. The western beach is uninhabited and accessible by two paths that descend the grass-covered cliffs from the eastern end of the Glen golf course. The eastern beach is by the hamlet.

This former fishing hamlet has been immortalised by William McGonagall in his poem Beautiful North Berwick and its surroundings. The Canty Bay Inn offered hospitality to the tourists who came to see the Bass Rock. The tenant of the Rock was usually also the innkeeper.

The William Edgar Evans Charitable Trust maintains a house and two cottages for use by Scout and Guide troops.

Dolphins can be seen at Canty Bay and from the Scottish Seabird Centre.

== See also ==
- List of places in East Lothian
