= Julian Billingham =

Scottish aristocrat (1673–1730)

Lady Julian Billingham or Bellingham (1673–1730) was a member of an aristocratic 17th-century Scottish family and a maker of soap.

== Background ==
She was a daughter of Grizell Ker and Patrick Hume of Polwarth. Her older sister was Lady Grizel Baillie (1665-1746), a collector of songs and author of recipe books. Their family home became Mellerstain House in 1707. A brother, Alexander Hume, became the 2nd Earl of Marchmont in 1724.

== Career ==
In 1686 the family went into exile. Julian had an uncomfortable journey to Brill. They settled at Utrecht, where her father pretended to be a Dr Wallace and Julian and her sisters learned to play a Ruckers harpsichord. They returned in 1688.

Some of her mother's account books survive, mentioning clothes bought for her in 1695. Black crêpe and muslin were bought for Anne and Julian. Julian was engaged to marry Sir James Hall of Dunglass, but it seems that Hall really wanted to marry Julian's younger sister Anne Hume. Instead, Julian Hume married Charles Billingham, an English soldier with no fortune, whose father was the supervisor of a glasshouse. John Billingham, known as "Justice Bellingham" (died 1700), had been manager of the Vauxhall glassworks for George Villiers, 2nd Duke of Buckingham, producing mirrors. John Bellingham had made glass in Haarlem and Amsterdam.

It was rumoured that Charles Billingham and his brother, also John, had escaped prosecution for highway robbery. Later, John Billingham, the brother, was arrested on two counts of forgery and confessed before his execution in October 1699 that he had been a teenage highwayman.

Anne Hume married Hall, who purchased the respectable post of deputy or lieutenant governor of Dumbarton Castle for his impecunious brother-in-law. The governor of the castle was John Erskine, Earl of Mar. Charles Billingham was also appointed warden of the Scottish mint in Edinburgh between 1701 and 1704. He sold the wardenship to William Drummond. In 1706, Julian's father, now Earl of Marchmont, recommended him to the Earl of Mar to command a company in Lord Mark Kerr's regiment. Charles Billingham, however, was not in good health, and died before June 1715, perhaps by 1708.

== Family business ==
One of Julian Billingham's daughters, possibly Jean, known as "Jeanny", compiled a recipe book including instructions for soap-making, with other recipes for making and painting wax fruit to decorate the table and for Japanning furniture. The recipe book is now held by National Library of Scotland. Such paintwork and larger looking-glasses were fashionable furnishings in Scotland. She attributed a recipe to make fresh soap from "four pecks of wood ashes" to her mother, followed by a method for making lye:

My Mother Lady Julian Billinghams receipt
To make Soap Lees
Take equil weight of Russia potash and quick lime and throw water upon it by degrees till the Lime is Slaik’t then throw on more water and Stir altogether till the Salt of the ashes is desolved after Some time pour the Liquor (filtered through a paper if needful) into another vessil as true Flanderes wine, pint of this Liquor measured with the greatest Sweetness ought to weigh just 16 ounces of water if it is, However an ounce of Stone & half of water is to be added to each pint of Liquor, but if Lighter it must be boiled till the like quantity of watter is carried of or Else must be throwen upon fresh lime and ashes.

In later life, Julian Billingham looked after her father at Berwick-upon-Tweed. In 1720, her daughter Jean married Charles William Tonyn, a Colonel in the Enniskillen Dragoons based in Berwick who was also a factor for Patrick Hume. Charlotte married John Hume, minister of Abbey St Bathans.
