= Marchmont (disambiguation) =

Marchmont is a residential area of Edinburgh, named for the then landowner, the Earl of Marchmont.

Marchmont may also refer to:

== Places ==
- Marchmont, an archaic name for Roxburgh Castle, from which the following take their name
- Marchmont House, in Berwickshire
- Marchmont Estate, in Berwickshire
- A community of the Severn, Ontario, township
- Marchmont, New South Wales

== Given names ==
- Marchmont Nedham, writer, publisher, and political commentator of the middle seventeenth century
- Marchmont Schwartz (1909–1991), college football head coach at Stanford

== Other ==
- Earl of Marchmont, a title in the Peerage of Scotland
- Edith Marchmont, a female sleuth written by Julius Chambers
- Marchmont Herald, a Scottish officer of arms at the Court of the Lord Lyon King of Arms
- Marchmont (novel), a novel by Charlotte Turner Smith
- SS Marchmont, a British cargo ship in service 1947–52

== See also ==
- Marchment, surname
