= Swinton (surname) =

Swinton is a surname in both Scotland and England (see Clan Swinton). Notable people with this surname include the following:

- Alexa Swinton (born 2009), American actress
- Alexander Swinton, Lord Mersington (1625–1700), Scottish judge
- Archibald Campbell Swinton (1812–1890), Scottish author, politician and professor of civil law
- Archibald Swinton (1731–1804), Scottish captain of the East India Company, noted for his collection of Indian paintings
- Barbara Swinton (born 1960), American judge on the Oklahoma Court of Civil Appeals
- David Swinton, American economist and president of Benedict College from 1994 to 2017
- Derius Swinton II (born 1985), American football coach
- Ernest Swinton (1868–1951), British Army major general involved in the development and adoption of the tank during the First World War, war correspondent, military history professor and author
- George Swinton (1859–1937), Scottish politician
- George Swinton (artist) (1917–2002), Canadian painter, historian and writer
- George Swinton (botanist) (1780–1854), Scottish botanist and civil servant in India
- James Rannie Swinton (1816–1888), Scottish portrait artist
- John Swinton (disambiguation)
- Lachlan Swinton (born 1997), Australian rugby union player
- Lee Swinton (1922–1994), American politician
- Noelene Swinton (born 1933), New Zealand high jumper
- Omari Swinton (born 1980), American economist
- Reggie Swinton (born 1975), American former National Football League player
- Tilda Swinton (born 1960), Scottish actress
- William Elgin Swinton (1900–1994), Scottish-Canadian paleontologist
