= John Swinton =

John Swinton may refer to:

- Sir John Swinton, 14th of that Ilk, 14th century Scottish soldier and mercenary leader
- Sir John Swinton, 15th of that Ilk (died 1424), Scottish soldier, son of the above
- John Swinton (died 1679) (1621?–1679), Scottish politician of the Wars of the Three Kingdoms and Interregnum
- John Swinton (died 1723) (before 1662–1723), Scottish politician, son of the above
- John Swinton (clergyman, born 1703) (1703–1777), British writer, academic, clergyman and orientalist
- John Swinton, Lord Swinton (1723–1799), Scottish lawyer, judge and writer
- John Swinton (journalist) (1829–1901), Scottish-American journalist and labor newspaper publisher
- John Swinton of Kimmerghame (1925–2018), British Army major-general
- John Swinton (theologian) (born 1957), Scottish academic and clergyman

== See also ==
- Swinton (surname)
