= Marchmont House =

House in Scottish Borders, Scotland

Coordinates: 55.7291°N 2.4104°W

Designations

Inventory of Gardens and Designed Landscapes in Scotland
- Official name: Marchmont
- Designated: 30 June 1987
- Reference no.: GDL00274

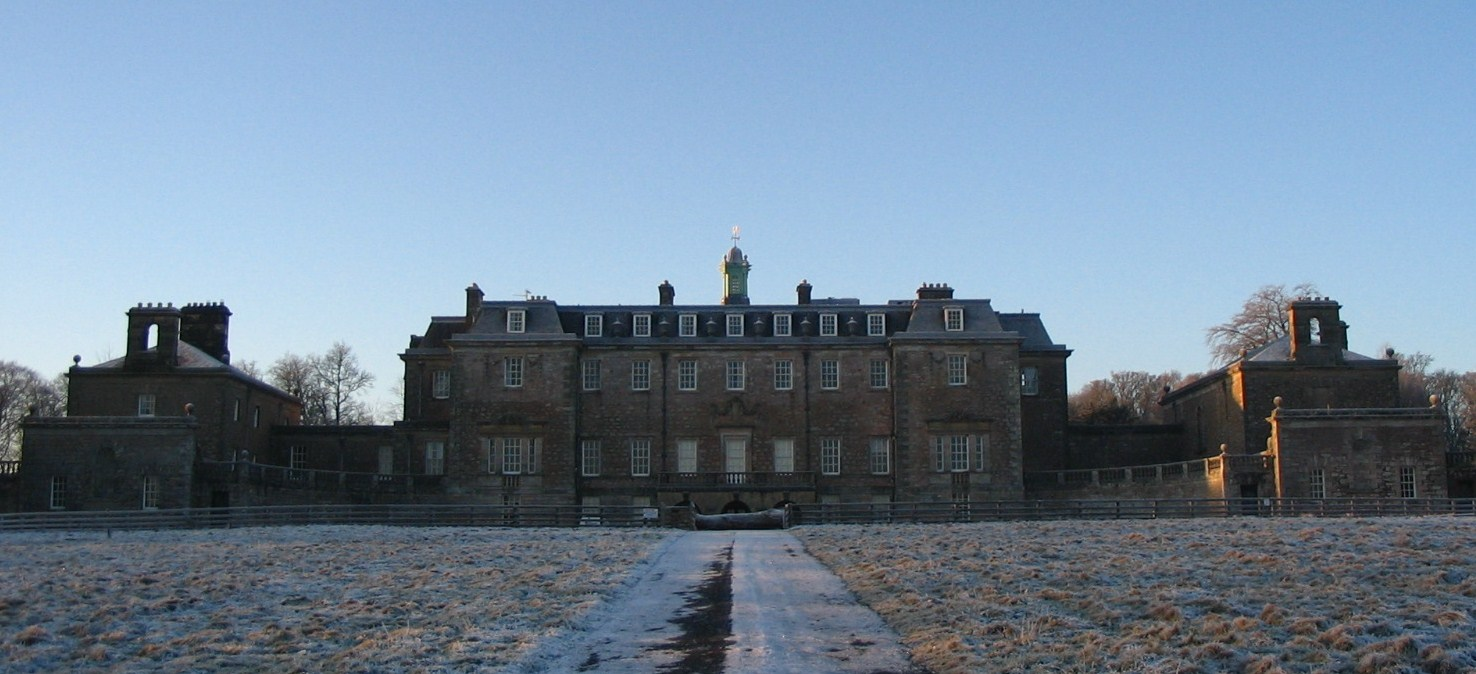
The front or east elevation of Marchmont House

Marchmont House lies on the east side of the village of Greenlaw, and near to a church in Polwarth in Berwickshire, in the Scottish Borders area of Scotland. It is about five miles (8 km) south west of Duns, about 19 miles (31 km) west of Berwick-upon-Tweed and about 40 miles (64 km) south east of Edinburgh. Situated in a gently undulating landscape, the estate is intersected by Blackadder Water, and its tributary burns. With the Lammermuir Hills to the north and views towards the Cheviot Hills in the south, this part of Berwickshire, sometimes referred to as the Merse, is scenic and contains rich agricultural land.

== History ==
The Palladian house was built by Hugh Hume-Campbell, 3rd Earl of Marchmont, in 1750. His bust, a plaster copy, sits on a wall bracket in the saloon. The original is in Mellerstain House, another important Borders house that has historical links with Marchmont. Before its completion, the family lived in Redbraes Castle, the ruins of which can be seen in front of the house by the steading. At Redbraes lived Sir Patrick Hume of Polwarth, later Patrick Hume, 1st Earl of Marchmont. His portrait by William Aikman, c 1720, and framed by a George II period gilt mirror, hangs above the chimneypiece in the drawing room. A nearly identical portrait hangs in the Music Room at Mellerstain.

Having been implicated in the Rye House Plot, Sir Patrick went into hiding in the vaults of Polwarth Church, close to the house. His daughter, Lady Grisell Hume, (later Grizel Baillie) smuggled food to him, and her well-trod path from Redbraes to the church became known as ‘Lady’s Walk’. Lady Grisell's life was a story of selfless bravery. She wrote her memoirs which were handed down to her daughter, who in turn transcribed them. In them, she tells of the fearful chapters she endured as a young teenager aiding her father and family. Sir Patrick fled to Holland in 1684, again assisted by his daughter, but made a glorious return with King William who reinstated their lands and created Sir Patrick the first Earl of Marchmont in 1697. He was later made Lord Chancellor, and then in 1698 he was elevated to "the highest official position in the kingdom, that of the King's High Commissioner to the Parliament". The king's gratitude was symbolized by his granting Sir Patrick permission to place an orange, bearing the Imperial crown, in his coat of arms. This can be seen on the carved coat of arms on the east gable of Polwarth church restored by, and once a self-imposed prison of, Sir Patrick.

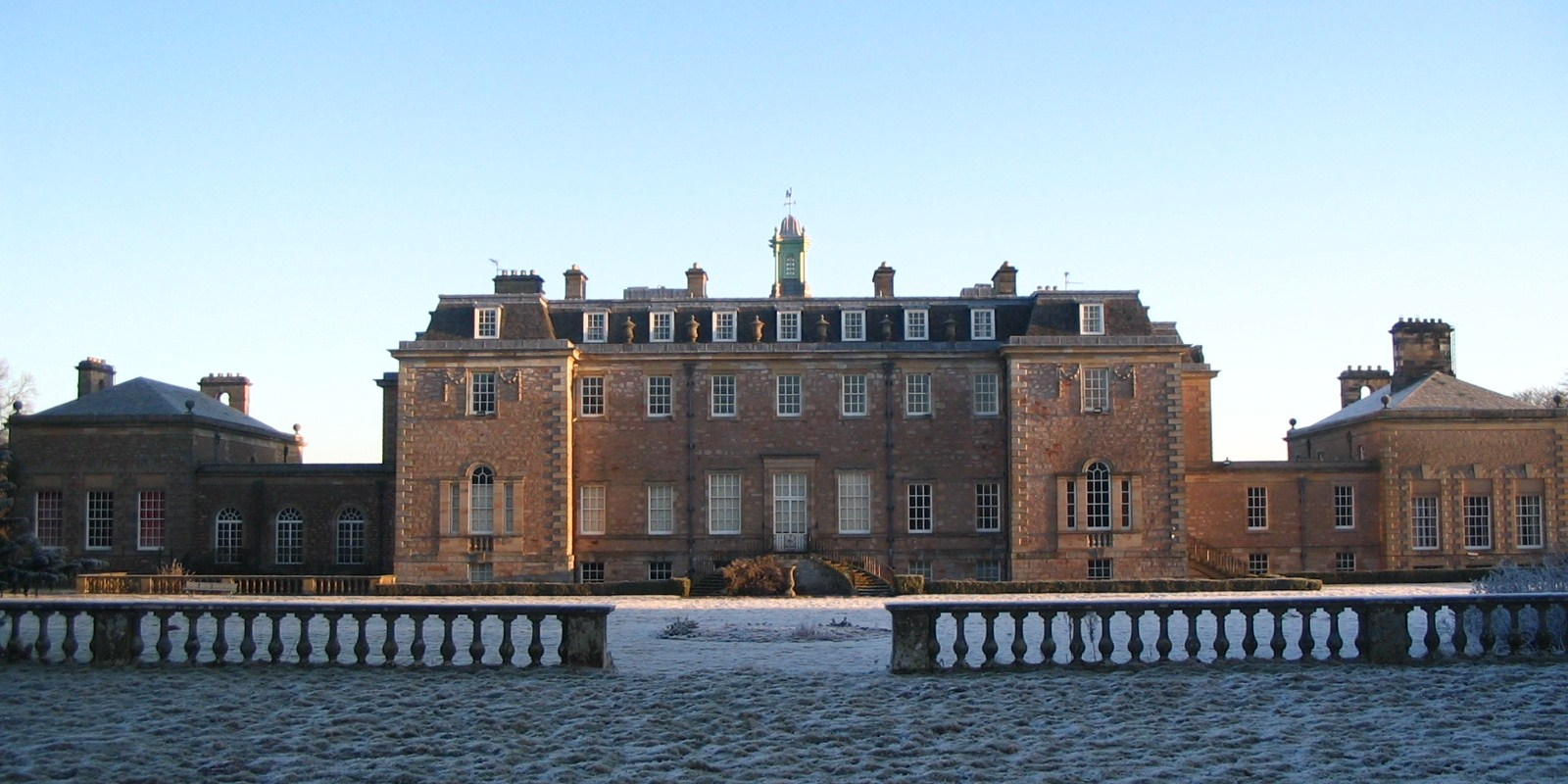
The rear or west elevation showing the mix of 18th, 19th, and early 20th Century architectural elements

== The house, its interior, and development ==
The family's prosperity in the late 17th century, brought about by the reward of loyalty to the Crown, made it possible for grand ideas of Marchmont House to be conceived. Thoughts of creating an impressive new family seat inspired Alexander, the second Earl, to draw up designs for the landscaping. He also commissioned William Adam to draw up plans for a new house, however these were considered to be too expensive. Both the 2nd Earl and Adam died before the house was started. It was the 3rd Earl, succeeding in 1740, who became responsible for the execution of the new building.

It is now understood that it was the lesser known architect, Thomas Gibson who designed the house. Colvin firmly attributes the design to Gibson, as does Macaulay. More recently, French, writing in Country Life, suggested that much of the design may be attributed to James Gibbs, the designer of Houghton Hall, since some of the stylistic features of Marchmont are very much in the manner of Gibbs. Marchmont's internal arrangement and elevations reflect those at Houghton Hall, Norfolk. It had been believed that William Adam may have designed the building. His influence may be present in the architecture as well as the garden design, as well as that of the Palladian revival style of Lord Burlington, a friend of the Earl of Marchmont. The second Earl's sister, Lady Grisell, married a Baillie from Mellerstain, where William Adam worked.

The interior is one of the finest in Scotland. Much of the original George II period plasterwork, executed by Thomas Clayton, remains. Clayton was the best plasterer in Scotland of his time and worked for William Adam and others. He worked at other houses, including The Drum in Edinburgh, the Duke's Apartments at Holyroodhouse, at Hamilton Palace, the Duke's house in Lanarkshire, Blair Atholl, Perthshire and Arniston House.

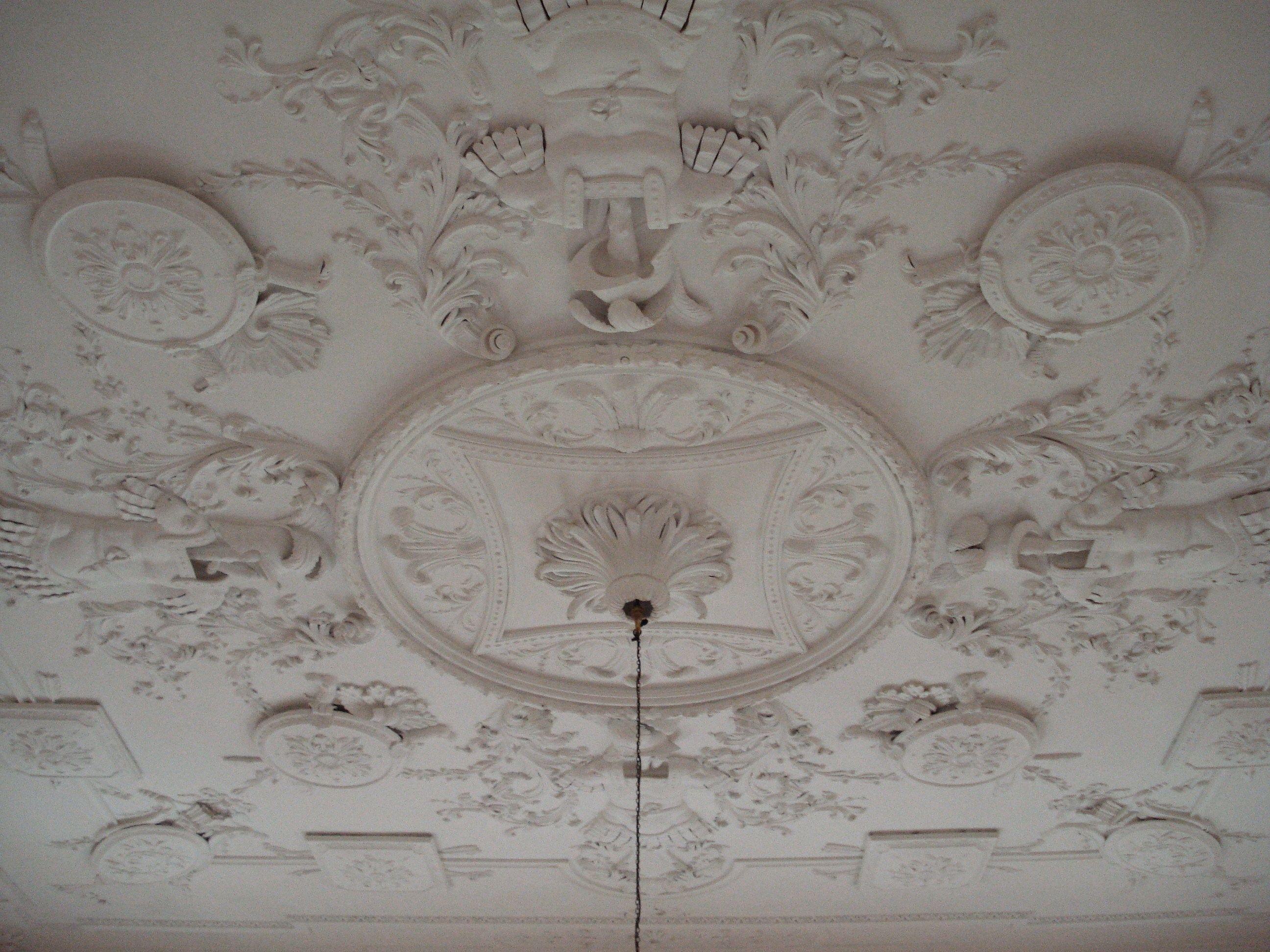
Thomas Clayton's plaster work on the ceiling in the Saloon

Clayton's best work can still be seen at Marchmont. The Saloon was decorated between 1753 and 1757 with military trophies on the ceiling and walls and family heraldry above door lintels detailing monograms of the 3rd Earl and his second wife. The Drawing Room celebrates the rich effect that the sun and the phases of the moon have on nature. The central panel is surrounded by baskets of fruit, flowers, and arable crops. This theme is echoed in the contemporary carved marble chimney piece decorated with the sun's rays seeming to emanate from the heat of the fire.

Some alterations to the rear elevation of the house were made in 1834–42 by the architect William Burn, but major changes were made in the early 20th century. The last of the Hume family to live in the house was Sir John Hume Campbell who sold it to Robert Finnie McEwen, father of Captain Sir John Helias Finnie McEwen, who inherited a considerable fortune from his uncles who had built the harbour at Rio de Janeiro. From 1914 to 1917 he commissioned Sir Robert Lorimer to make various alterations: a top floor was added and given dormer windows in a steeper pitched roof; the flanking pavilions were connected to the house internally; by lowering the ground at the front of the house the entrance was relocated on the ground floor with the addition of a porch, and the former entrance, now the central window of the first-floor saloon, made redundant.

Internally the main staircase was removed and replaced by a two-story open internal hall surmounted by an oval cupola, and a new grander staircase was located to the right of the entrance beneath a dome. The dining room and library were exchanged so that the latter now overlooks the front of the house. A grand double-storey music room, originally designed by Lorimer for Rowallan Castle, was made out of the stable wing in the north pavilion. It is finely paneled in oak with delicate carving modeled by Louis Deuchars and carved by W. and A. Clow. At the east end of the room is placed a fine full-size organ by Norman and Beard of Norwich. The grand music room, one of the focal points of the house, symbolizes McEwen's love of music. We are reminded again of this love for music and that for country sports by 20th-century plaster panels by Thomas Beattie decorating the second floor of the stairwell. An accomplished musician himself, McEwen set poems by Robert Burns and Sir Walter Scott to music.

The house was sold to Sue Ryder Care for use as a nursing home in the 1980s. In 2007, the house was purchased by Oliver Burge, the owner of the extensive surrounding Marchmont Estate which he had purchased in 1988, comprising eventually some 5,500 acres of farmland. Extensive renovations both to the house and grounds were made in subsequent years, although these were largely the responsibility of his son, Hugo Burge, the internet entrepreneur. The music room has seen the organ fully restored and has been the location for public recitals. The top floor includes self-contained accommodation furnished with Arts and Crafts furniture. One of the outbuildings has been converted for the use of furniture makers practicing the craft of turned rush-seated ladder-back chairs following the designs of Philip Clissett and Ernest Gimson. Murals have been added to the central space. The house has been open to the public during the summer months.

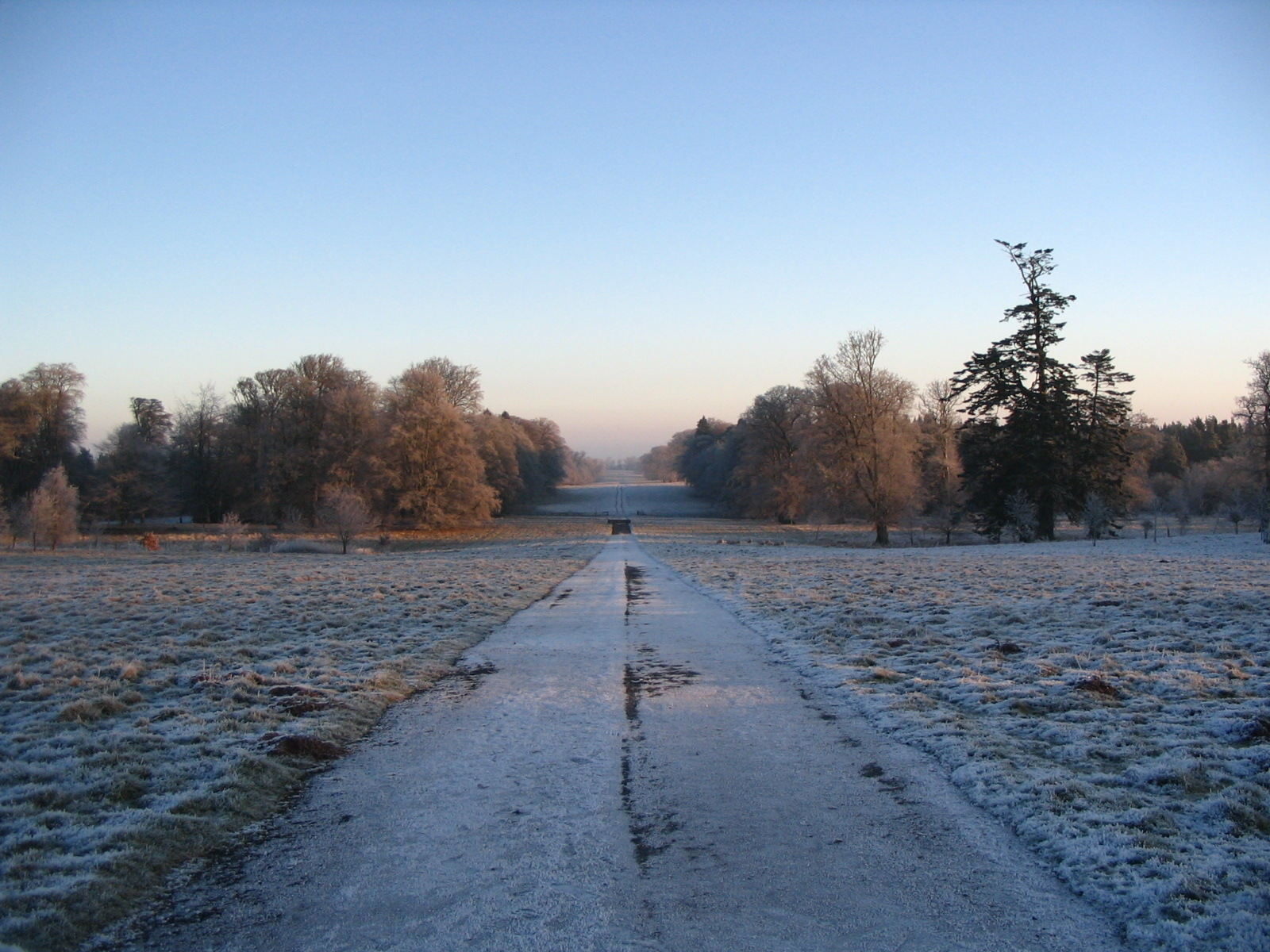
The avenue looking east, thought to be the longest in Scotland

== The grounds and outbuildings ==
Thoughts of replacing the family seat of Redbraes Castle with a new and grand house started long before the foundations were laid. The planting of the Great Avenue was begun in 1726 when 10,000 Dutch elms were ordered to line the avenue which at 1.3 miles (2.1 km) long is thought to be the longest in Scotland. Still in existence, (albeit with other trees, mostly beech, planted after the great gales of 1881) it leads northeast from the front of the house and terminates at the Doocot, built in 1749 by James Williamson.

There are about 390 acres (1.6 km^{2}) of the designed landscape, more or less in the same format as originally laid out. The gardens were originally arranged formally and to the south and south west or rear of the house. The layout can be seen in an early Ordnance Survey map of 1858. A ha-ha separates the formal gardens from the deer park to allow a seamless view leading from the tightly arranged garden through into the wilder, but still man-ordered, a policy of the deer park. Here there are many mature trees, some thought to date from the late 18th century. In 1962 the tallest oak in Britain was recorded at Marchmont. Specimen trees surround the gardens and include a fine cut-leaf beech, an arbutus, a Wellingtonia, cedars and hollies.

In the trees, behind the house to the north west, can be seen a pets’ cemetery. Closer inspection shows a neatly laid-out arrangement of 23 headstones bearing the names of fox hounds. Dating from 1866 carved with the name "Spot" to 1891 with "Little Boy", the stones relate to Patrick Hume's three packs of hounds. In addition to the Doocot already mentioned, other interesting constructions on the Estate are the steading built around a courtyard, which dates to the 17th century; the yard clock dated 1746; the associated but later three-story tower; the arched concrete span over garages, and the William Adam designed balustraded bridge of 1759, which connected the main entrance route from the north (named the Green Ride) to the approach to the house. The walled gardens laid out in the 18th century to the south of the house incorporate a magnificent greenhouse and associated structures built by Mackenzie and Moncur in 1915 after designs attributed to Lorimer.

== Berwickshire Railway ==
The House had a private railway station on the North British Railway's Berwickshire Railway (opened 1863). The railway line ran from Reston to Earlston, joining the East Coast Main Line to the Waverley Line. Marchmont Estate Railway Station was closed to passenger traffic 10 September 1951. Freight continued until 19 July 1965. The station building still stands, currently, a private house and the platform remains.

== See also ==
- Marchmont Estate
- List of places in the Scottish Borders
- Sir Patrick Hume of Polwarth and Redbraes

== Sources ==
- Kitty Cruft, John Dunbar and Richard Fawcett, ‘'The Buildings of Scotland:Borders’' Pevsner Architectural Guides, ISBN 0-300-10702-1.
- Marchmont and the Humes of Polwarth, by One of Their Descendants [Margaret Warrender] 1894 ISBN 0-902664-30-1
- Memoirs of the Lives and Characters of the Right Honourable George Baillie of Jerviswood and of Lady Grisell Baillie, by Their Daughter, Lady Murray of Stanhope. Edinburgh 1874.
- Historic Environment Scotland. "MARCHMONT ESTATE, MARCHMONT HOUSE INCLUDING GARDEN WALLS, STAIRS AND SUNDIAL (Category A Listed Building LB15386)".
- http://www.rcahms.gov.uk/highlightlorimer.html
- http://www.historic-scotland.gov.uk/index/heritage/
