= Justice Covington =

Justice Covington may refer to:

- Ann K. Covington (born 1942), chief justice of the Supreme Court of Missouri
- J. Harry Covington (1870–1942), chief justice of the Supreme Court of the District of Columbia

== See also ==
- Alexander Lockhart, Lord Covington (1700–1782), Scottish Senator of the College of Justice
- Virginia M. Hernandez Covington (born 1955), judge of the United States District Court for the Middle District of Florida
