= Andrew Hume, Lord Kimmerghame =

Scottish judge (1676–1730)

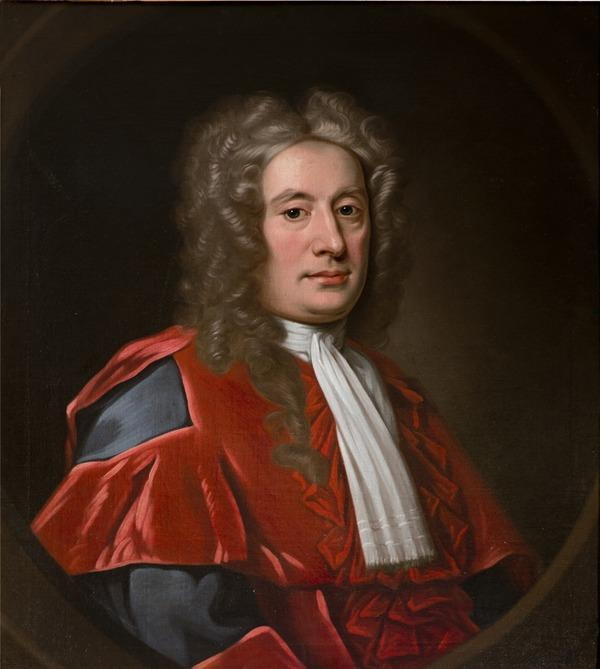

Andrew Hume, Lord Kimmerghame MP (1676–1730) was a Scottish judge and Senator of the College of Justice. He also held several politic roles including member for Kirkcudbright.

== Life ==
Hume was born on 19 July 1676 the fourth son of Patrick Hume, 1st Earl of Marchmont and his wife, Grisell Ker, daughter of Sir Thomas Ker of Cavers. Andrew's father went into exile in 1684 due to his being thought to have been involved in the Rye House Plot. The family spent some years in the Netherlands, only returning to Scotland in 1688 after the Glorious Revolution. In 1690 the new king, William III, made Patrick Hume a knight with the title Lord Polwarth for his help in returning the king to the throne. The king also restored the hereditary role as Sheriff of Berwickshire to Sir Patrick, who then pronounced his son Depute Sheriff, despite his only being 14 years of age.

Andrew returned to the Netherlands for his university education, studying law and graduating at the University of Utrecht in 1695 and passing the Scottish bar as an advocate in 1696, the same year in which is father was created Lord Chancellor, heading the Scottish legal profession. Andrew worked in a senior position for the government excise as Collector of Tunnage from 1695. This role was based in Edinburgh and in 1698 he was also appointed a Burgess of the city.

He was knighted in 1698. From 1700 until 1707 he was MP for Kirkcudbright. In the Union of 1707 he acted as a Commissioner. In the election of 1708 Hume lost his seat to his brother-in-law George Baillie.

On 23 November 1714 he was created a Senator of the College of Justice in place of Alexander Campbell, Lord Cessnock.

He died on 16 March 1730. His position as Senator was filled by Alexander Fraser, Lord Strichen.

== Family ==
In 1700 he married Elizabeth Douglas, daughter of John Douglas of Newcastle, sister of Oley Douglas and widow of her cousin Sir William Douglas. They had a son John (1711–1738) and two daughters: Helen who married Andrew Wauchope and Elizabeth who married Charles St Clair, 2nd Lord Sinclair.

Andrew was brother to the poet Lady Grizel Baillie who married George Baillie.
