= Marchmont Estate =

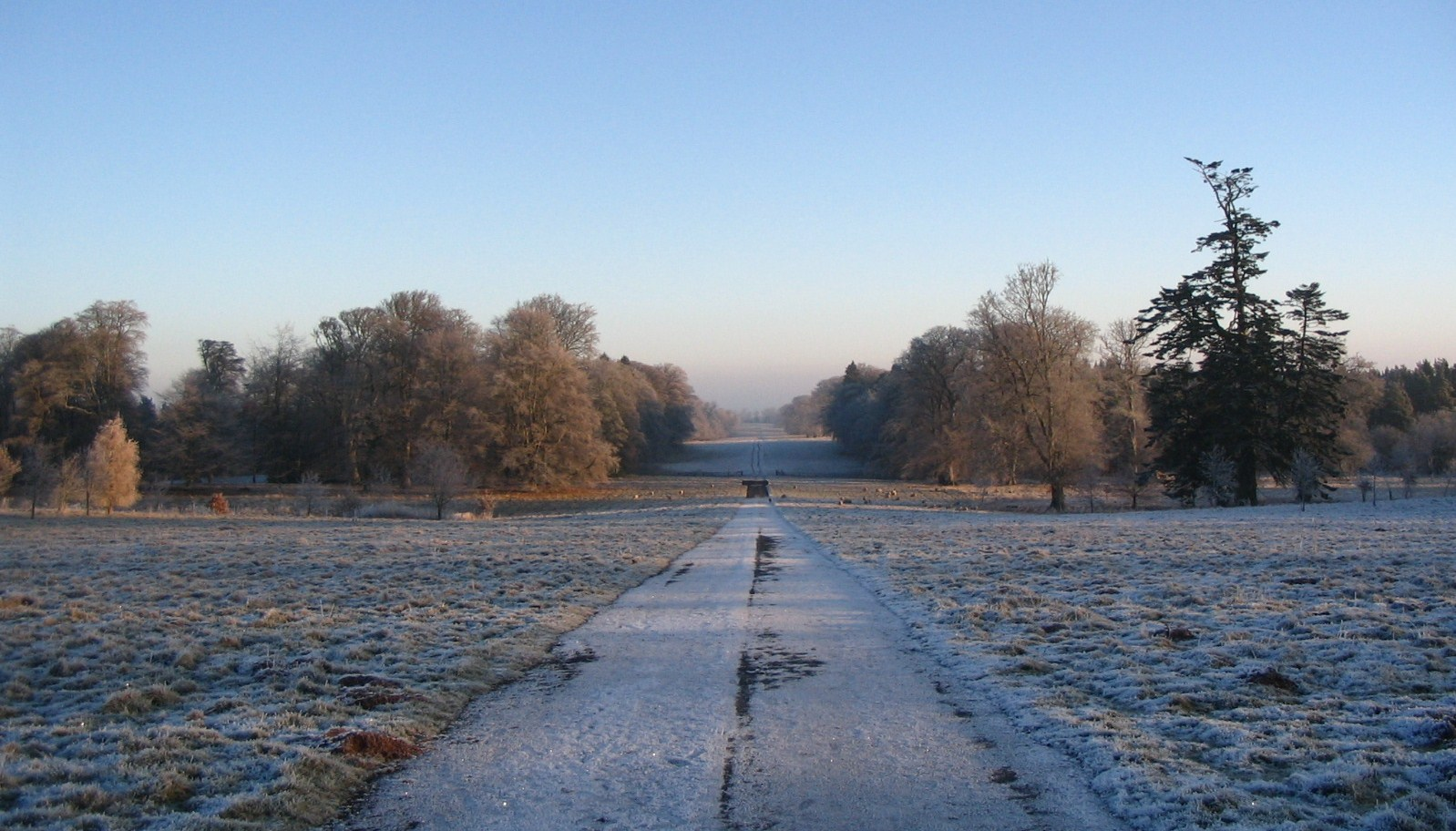
The Avenue, Marchmont Estate

Marchmont Estate lies near the village of Greenlaw in Berwickshire in the Scottish Borders area of Scotland, some 45 miles (72 km) south east of Edinburgh. It is situated in the Merse, an area between the Lammermuirs to the north and the Cheviots to the south. It is part of what is commonly regarded as an exceptionally beautiful landscape, comprising a diverse range of land types from high and exposed grouse moor to rich alluvial agricultural land. The life of the estate has seen many stages, including rapid growth, shrinkage and stability, from its foundation in the fifteenth century under the first Hume owner, Patrick Hume, of Polwarth, through his successors and subsequent owners to the present day.

== History ==
The history of Marchmont Estate can only be marked out by noting the changes to its constitution during the course of its existence. There are a number of documents on the matter in places such as the National Archives of Scotland and Register House in Edinburgh, but many of these are estate papers dealing with internal or personal issues rather than the bigger picture. This article is interested more in the fluctuations of its size and reasons for these changes.

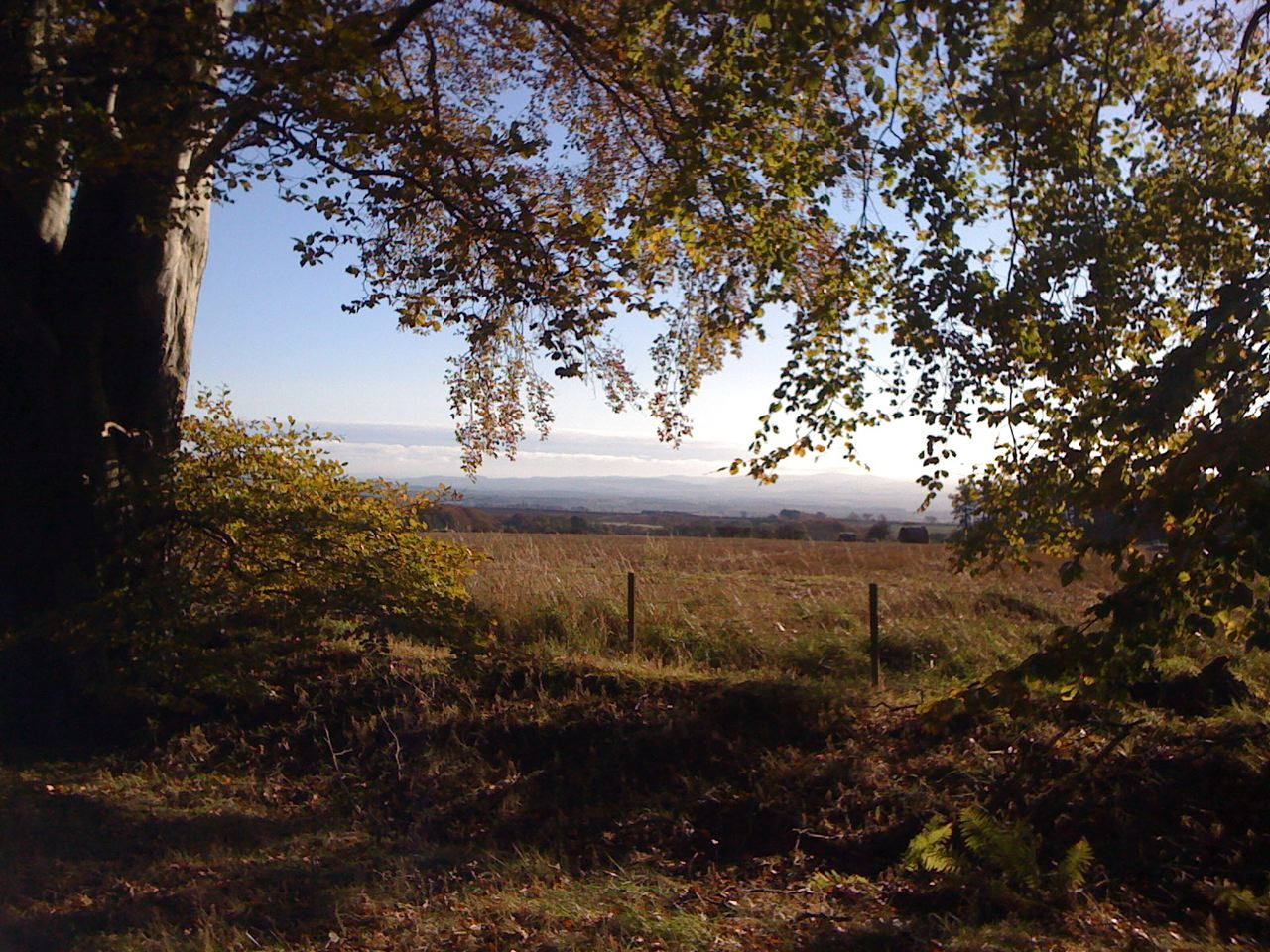
View of Marchmont Estate from the Green Ride

Marchmont Estate was developed as a result of the improved fortunes of a certain Sir Patrick Hume, 8th Baron of Polwarth, born in 1641. As his territorial designation indicates, he lived in the parish of Polwarth (which was the core of the estate of Marchmont), a small but prosperous parish between Greenlaw and Duns. The name of the family seat was Redbraes Castle to which they removed from Polwarth Castle following the latter's destruction in the 'Rough Wooing' wars of the 1540s. The Humes of Polwarth acquired the barony through marriage in 1470. A staunch supporter of William of Orange, Sir Patrick was forced to flee to Holland and Polwarth estates were confiscated in 1686. He returned with the new king, King William III of Great Britain in 1689 and was rewarded greatly by the king for his brave loyalty by being given the title Lord Polwarth in 1690. In addition his lands and other dignities were restored to him. Moreover, he was made Lord Chancellor in 1697 and created Earl of Marchmont, and then in 1698 was elevated to "the highest official position in the kingdom, that of the King's High Commissioner to the Parliament". These positions came with immense political power and therefore wealth. It is with this wealth that Marchmont Estate was able to grow so quickly while the Earl bought up surrounding lands and houses.–

== Changing fortunes ==
The late 17th century and most of the 18th century saw the rapid expansion of the estate while the Humes of Marchmont were at their strongest financially and the most powerful magnates in Berwickshire. It was not however until 1755 that the Hume family moved from Redbraes Castle adjacent to their new home, Marchmont House, a family seat befitting such an estate. Ideas and plans had been drawn up earlier in the century by Alexander the 2nd Earl, but it was not until Hugh, the 3rd Earl’s time that the house was actually built. The construction of this great house, together with many of the land purchases in the 18th century, were funded to a large extent by the sale of Cessnock estates, which came into the ownership of the family following the marriage between the Alexander the 2nd Earl, and Margaret Campbell. She was "a great heiress, and on her father’s death, in 1704, her husband succeeded him, not only in his Ayrshire estates, but also in his place on the Scottish Bench, where he sat under the same title of Lord Cessnock". The political power and wealth of the Hume family therefore continued. "Lord Marchmont took a great interest in his estates,....he laid out a great deal of money on his property and very much increased its extent by the purchase of Home Castle and its surrounding lands, and also of other farms lying nearer the Tweed".

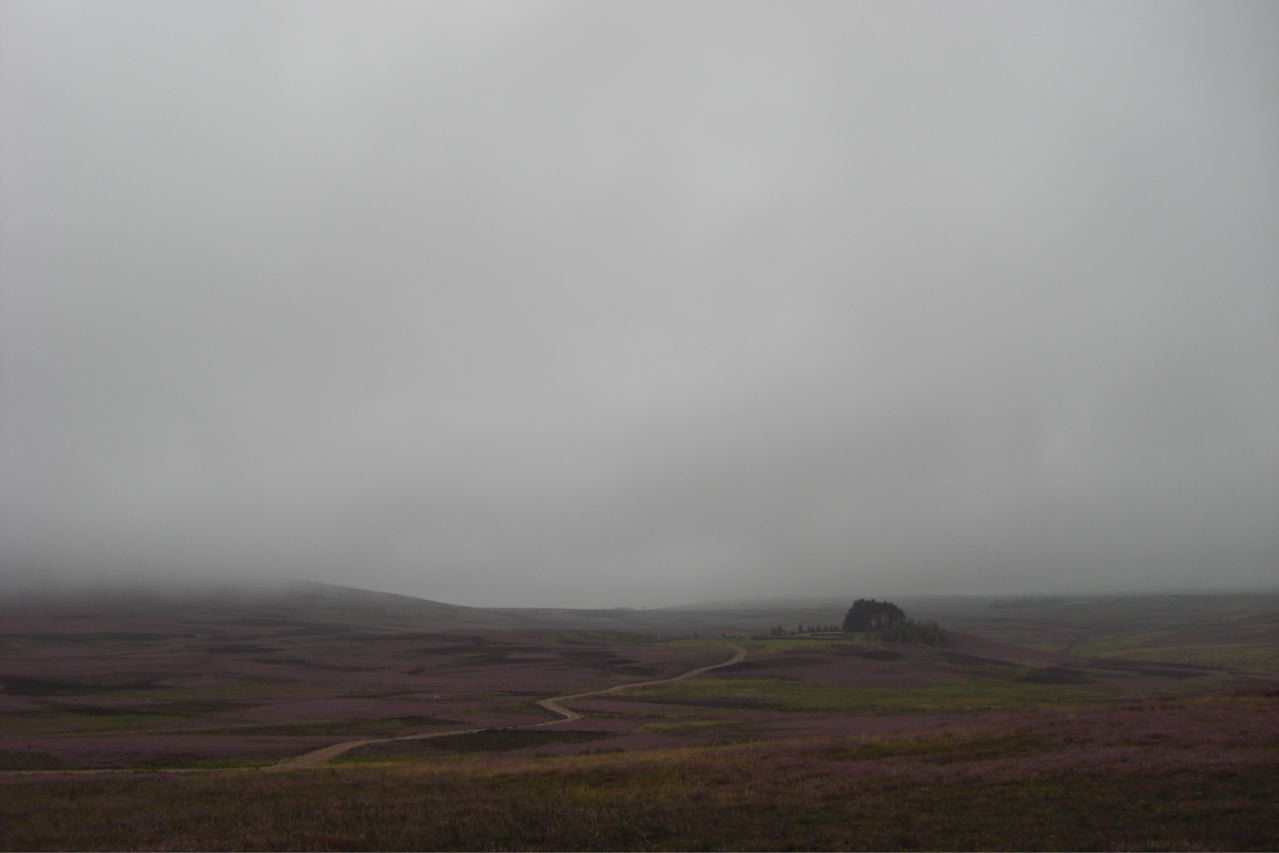
Kippet Law, Marchmont Estate

In the 1779 "Accounts of the Rt Hon the Earl of Marchmont" by John Wauchope WS we can see exactly how fast the estate expanded. The detailed inventory lists all the purchases from the last part of the 17th century and through most of the 18th century. Many of the names of farms and lands listed in the inventory are still used today. Others are now unrecognisable owing to the changing patterns of agricultural land use. The list of names and dates of acquisitions include: Slegden 1668; Greenlaw 1697; Foulshallow (probably the now called Flourishwalls) 1700; Hallyburton 1702; East end of Fogo 1725; Bellshill 1710; Hurdlaw 1712; Gordonbank, Bellshill, Spencerigg 1775;Barony of Hume 1766; Rollandston 1762 Braelands of Hapington (Hassington), east end of Fogo 1771; Eccleshill 1779; The Slap 1779. The estate acquired farms many miles away and apparently unconnected to the existing land. Such farms were Headshaw and Kelphope at Carfrae, roughly halfway to Edinburgh.Channanbank at Abbey St. Bathans had been added to the estate much earlier in the 1660s.. It is not easy to see why these were bought as they don't seem to be part of a geographical pattern.

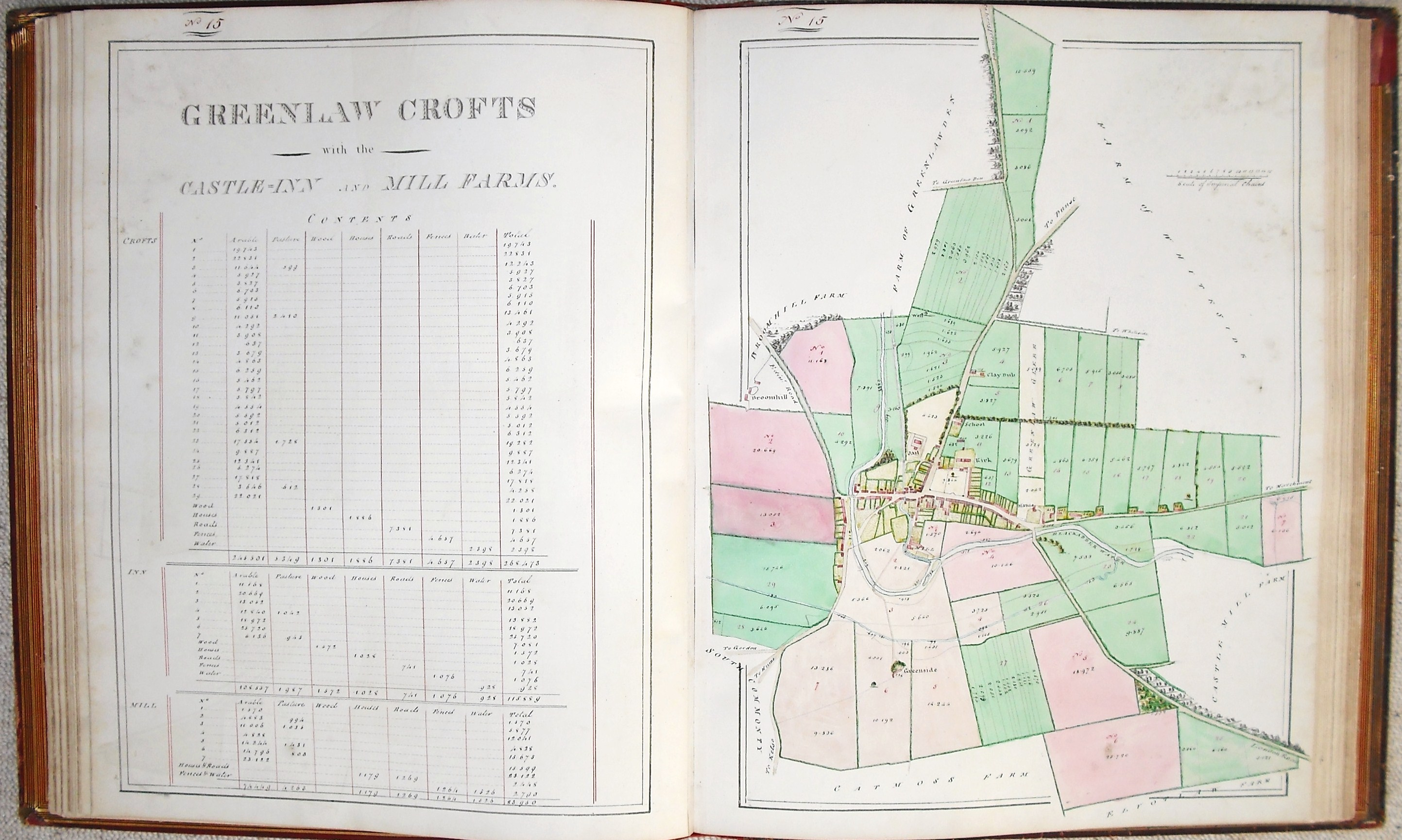
Pages from the 1825 illustrated survey of Marchmont Estate

In addition to the "Accounts of the Rt Hon the Earl of Marchmont" there are two further reliable references that document the composition of the estate and thereby act as milestones in its history. First is the detailed 1825 atlas and survey of the estate when in the ownership of Sir William Purves-Hume-Campbell. The second is the sale particulars of the auction of the house and estate in June 1913, held by John D Wood and instructed on behalf of Sir John Hume Campbell, Bt., the last of the Hume owners.

The 1825 survey states that the lands extend to about 21,000 acres (85 km^{2}). Such was the importance of the estate that a railway station was built for it, presumably as much for agricultural use as personal. The station was situated between Duns and Greenlaw stations on the Berwickshire Railway line which was opened on 1 August 1849 to join Reston to the main Edinburgh to Hawick line at Ravenswood Junction near St Boswells. The track at Marchmont was lifted in 1953. However, by the time the estate was put up for sale in 1913, approximately 90 years later, the estate had reduced in size to about 13,500 acres (55 km^{2}). in fact the size of the estate when eventually sold at auction was 5,000 acres (20 km^{2}). The reduction in the size of the estate was due to the dwindling wealth of the Hume family of Marchmont. Many of the outlying farms were sold off, in particular the belt of estate situated south of Greenlaw such as Hume, Stanmore, Belmont and Hassendean. These are recorded as being part of Marchmont in a plan of the estate dated 1902. Therefore, the disposal of these must have taken place in the first few years of the 20th century. The central core north and north west of Greenlaw was largely retained. It is no surprise that the parkland around the house has changed little over the 250 years or so since the house was built. Although some trees have been cut down, the handsome avenue, arguably the longest in Scotland, stills leads to the house from a north easterly direction. During the remainder of most of the 20th century and during the time of the former proprietor the estate comprised the following farms: Woodheads, Whiteside Slegden, Clerkenville, Castlemill, Elwartlaw and Cothill, the last two being sold off in about 1978 and 1981 respectively. However latterly the estate has seen some of areas of land bought back or added. It now has about 5,500 acres (22 km^{2}) of freehold land and a further 3,500 acres (14 km^{2}) of leased land, a total which is significant by modern-day standards.

Research into the subject shows there are a number of documents of incidental interest that one comes across that tell a more human story about the estate and its workings. The Marchmont estate "Work Bork" of 1743–45 lists, day by day, the tasks of the estate labourers, where they worked and how much they were paid. We can take Jo Nisbet, one of those workers, as an example. He is detailed as "digging Marle" on Monday 20th. Marl, like lime was used as a soil additive, improving it chemically and biologically, and was used in areas such as this in Berwickshire and Roxburghshire which had clay soil. At places like Marchmont in the lowlands, adding marl and lime was central to agricultural success by improving the soil. He then went on to carry out other duties such as "moeing" or "forking hay", "holding up plow", "threshing oats", and "draining nursery". For 4 days work they would be typically be paid ¼, going up to 2- for 6 days work. Most of the 25 or so men worked 6 days a week, even on Christmas Day and other days we would consider holidays.

== See also ==
- Marchmont House
- List of places in the Scottish Borders
