= Alexander Fraser, Lord Strichen =

Scottish judge

Alexander Fraser, Lord Strichen (1700–1775) was a Scottish judge and Senator of the College of Justice.

== Life ==
He was born at Strichen Castle in Aberdeenshire the eldest son of Alexander Strichen (1660-1699), 5th Laird of Strichen. His father died shortly before his birth. His mother died when he was eleven. Strichen Castle had been the family home since its construction in the 16th century.

He studied law and passed the bar as an advocate around 1722. On 15 June 1729 he was created a Senator of the College of Justice (at age 29 one of the youngest Senators ever) in place of the late Andrew Hume, Lord Kimmerghame.

His house in Edinburgh stood on the Royal Mile on Rosehaugh's Close (later called Strichens Close in his honour).

He died on 15 January 1775 at his country estate of Strichen.

His position as Senator was filled by Alexander Lockhart, Lord Covington.

== Family ==
He married Lady Lydia Ann Campbell (1692-1736) daughter of Archibald Campbell, 1st Duke of Argyll and widow of James Stuart, 2nd Earl of Bute.

Through this marriage he became stepfather to John Stuart, 3rd Earl of Bute, who later served as Prime Minister of Great Britain.
