= George Baillie-Hamilton, 14th Earl of Haddington =

British peer (born 1985)

George Edmund Baldred Baillie-Hamilton, 14th Earl of Haddington (born 27 December 1985), is a British peer and landowner.

The son of John Baillie-Hamilton, 13th Earl of Haddington, he was educated at Belhaven Hill School, Eton College, and the University of Glasgow, where he gained a degree in arts and media informatics. After that, he moved to London and worked as a freelance writer, including for Mary Killen, the agony aunt at The Spectator and a star of Gogglebox with her husband Giles Wood.

When his father died, in 2016, he inherited his peerages and the Mellerstain House estate in Kelso and decided to move back there to take charge of the historic house.

Haddington married Constanza Dessain, daughter of Simon James Francis Dessain, of Inverkeilor, Arbroath in 2021.

In November 2023, he was fined £500 and disqualified from driving for a year after a drink-driving incident on the A6105 in April 2023.

Peerage of Scotland
Preceded by John Baillie-Hamilton	Earl of Haddington; 2016–	Incumbent
