= Alexander Hume-Campbell, 2nd Earl of Marchmont =

Scottish nobleman, politician and judge

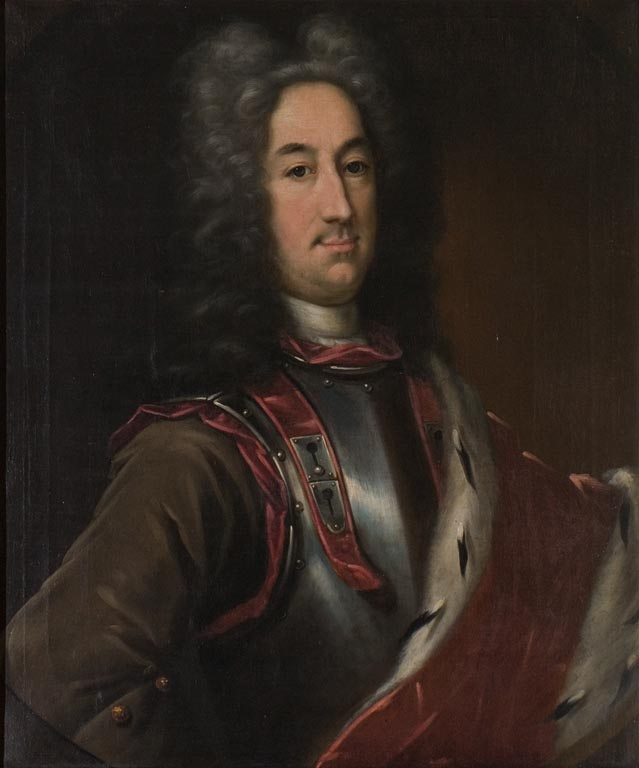
The 2nd Earl of Marchmont.

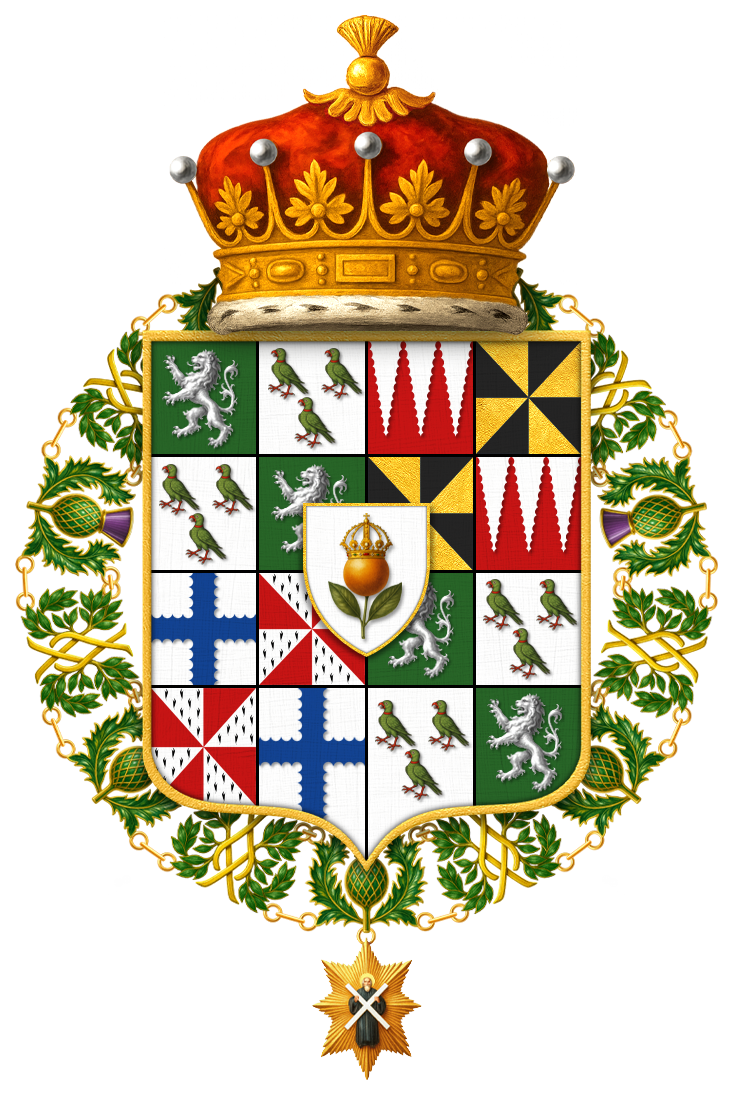
Shield of arms of Alexander Hume-Campbell, 2nd Earl of Marchmont, KT, PC

Alexander Hume-Campbell, 2nd Earl of Marchmont KT PC (1675 – 27 February 1740), was a Scottish nobleman, politician and judge.

== Life ==
The third but eldest surviving son of Patrick Hume, 1st Earl of Marchmont, by his spouse Grisel (d.1703), daughter of Sir Thomas Ker of Cavers, he assumed the additional surname of Campbell upon his marriage in 1697 with Margaret (d. 1722), daughter and heiress of Sir George Campbell of Cessnock, Ayrshire.

He studied law at Utrecht University and became an advocate in 1696. He was appointed to the Court of Session in 1704 with the judicial title Lord Cessnock, and served there until 1714.

He was a Commissioner to the Parliament of Scotland for Berwickshire in 1706, and was a supporter of the Union with England. He was Lord Clerk Register from 1716 to 1733.

He was ambassador to Denmark from 1715 to 1721, and to the Congress at Cambray in 1722.

He succeeded his father to the earldom in 1724, and was a Scottish representative peer from 1727 to 1734.

Alexander served as one of the founding governors of Britain's first childcare charity, the Foundling Hospital, which received its royal charter in 1739.

Parliament of Scotland
Preceded by George Traill	Burgh Commissioner for Kirkwall; 1698–1702	Succeeded by Robert Douglas
Preceded by Sir Robert Sinclair; Sir John Home; Sir John Swinton; Sir Patrick Home	Shire Commissioner for Berwick; 1706–1707; With: Sir Robert Sinclair; Sir John Swinton; Sir Patrick Home	Succeeded by Parliament of Great Britain
Peerage of Scotland
Preceded by Patrick Hume	Earl of Marchmont; 1724–1740	Succeeded by Hugh Hume-Campbell
