= Patrick Hume of Polwarth =

Scottish courtier

Patrick Hume, of Polwarth and Redbraes (about 1550– 20 May 1609) was a Scottish landowner, courtier and makar (court poet).

== Origins ==
Born about 1550, he was the eldest son and heir of Sir Patrick Hume (died 20 May 1599), of Polwarth and Redbraes, and his wife Agnes, daughter of Alexander Hume, of Manderston. Both families held lands on the east coast of Scotland between Edinburgh and Berwick-upon-Tweed. He had six brothers, including the cleric, poet and courtier Alexander Hume (died 1609), and four sisters, including Margaret Hume who was prioress of North Berwick abbey.

== Career ==
Patrick Hume was introduced to the Scottish court, probably by his father as a member of the royal household, sometime before 1580. He became one of the household servants of the king, James VI and in May 1580 was appointed to attend the king at his "riding and passing to the field".

He is probably best known to history through his association with the Castalian Band, the group of court poets writing in Scots headed by the king in the 1580s and 1590s. Only two works by him are known, his first published poem, The Promine (1580), a hagiographical portrait of the king in aureate verse, and his contribution to The Flyting Betwixt Montgomerie and Polwart (c.1583), a poetic contest in which he proved himself a worthy opponent to Alexander Montgomerie. Both works have survived.

On 1 November 1590 he was appointed an ordinary gentleman of Anne of Denmark's bedchamber. He became a Scottish warden of the Marches in 1591.

Hume was bailie of Bonkill from 1592 for James VI. He was instructed to use the rents from the houses in the mains of Bonkyll to pay the wages of the king's huntsman John Acheson. He was involved in the keeping of Tantallon Castle for the crown for three months.

Ludovic Stewart, 2nd Duke of Lennox wrote a letter in his favour in December 1592, mentioning his service to his father, Esmé Stewart, 1st Duke of Lennox.

Polwart became a Master of Household to Anne of Denmark in March 1602 and made an oath of fidelity to the Chancellor, John Graham, 3rd Earl of Montrose. In November 1602 she commanded him to give her embroiderer Thomas Barclay a daily allowance of food, coal and candle in the household.

Hume was knighted, probably around 1605, though he does not seem to have had quite the same courtly ambition as his younger brothers. He was a rather reluctant juror in the 1606 treason trial in Linlithgow brought by George Home, 1st Earl of Dunbar on behalf of the king in London against a number of Church of Scotland ministers who were defying James' attempts to bring about a union between the Scottish and English Churches.

== Marriage and children ==
Patrick Hume married Juliana Ker, daughter of Sir Thomas Ker of Ferniehirst and Jonet Scot, daughter of Sir William Scott of Kirkud. She was a half-sister of King's James' favourite, Robert Carr, 1st Earl of Somerset.

After Patrick's death, Julian Ker married in September 1613, as his third wife, Thomas Hamilton, 1st Earl of Haddington. She died in March 1637.

Their children included:

- Sir Patrick Hume (died 1648), who married Christian Hamilton, a daughter of Alexander Hamilton of Innerwick
- Thomas Hume of Coldstream
- George Hume of Kimmerghame
- Elizabeth Hume, who married James Carmichael of Carmichael

== See also ==
- Patrick Hume, 1st Earl of Marchmont
