= Marchment =

Marchment is a surname. Notable people with the surname include:

- Bryan Marchment (1969–2022), Canadian ice hockey player
- Ella Marchment (born 1992), British opera director and university professor
- Josephine Marchment (1897–1966), Irish spy
- Kennedy Marchment (born 1996), Canadian ice hockey forward
- Mason Marchment (born 1995), Canadian professional ice hockey forward

== See also ==
- Marchmont (disambiguation)
