= Alexander Hume =

Scottish poet

Alexander Hume (1558 – 4 December 1609) was a Scottish poet who served as Moderator of the General Assembly of the Church of Scotland in the early 17th century.

== Life ==
He was born in 1558 the son of Patrick Hume (d.1599).

The brother of Patrick Hume of Polwarth, he was educated at the University of St. Andrews graduating in 1574 then studied Civil Law in Paris. He returned to Scotland in 1578 serving in the Court of Justice, but (ironically) found it too corrupt for his tastes and decided instead to devote himself to the service of the church, and became minister of Logie Kirk in Stirlingshire in 1597. This appears to have been at least partly supported by Alexander Home of North Berwick, Provost of Edinburgh. His stipend (or at least the bulk of it) appears to have been paid by his own father rather than by the church.

His manse stood to the west of the church in the grounds of Airthrey Castle and dated from 1590.

He served as Moderator of the General Assembly of the Church of Scotland "several times": thought to be 1602, 1604 and 1607 (possibly also 1599).

On 6 May 1608 he was attacked by a parishioner (possibly his brother in-law), James Duncanson, with a heavy staff and never recovered. Duncanson is probably the same James Duncanson mentioned in parish records of April 1595 for having "carnal deal together" with Agnes Forester of Stirling, where the church forced them to marry.

Hume grew ill in May 1609 and died on 4 December of that year.

In his will he left a considerable number of books plus several musical instruments. To his best friend John Scherar a baillie in Stirling he left a gold ring to remember his "special love". He left his "love and Christian affection" to Dame Marie Stewart, Countess of Mar, the poet Lady Elizabeth Melvil, Lady Comrie, John Gillespie minister of Alva, Ninian Drummond minister of Dunblane, William Stirling minister of Port of Menteith, John Alison minister of Kincardine, William Nairn minister of Kippen and James Caldwell minister of Bothkennar.

His position at Logie Kirk was filled by Rev James Saittone or Seytoun of Denny before the end of the year.

== Works ==
He published in 1599 Hymnes, or Sacred Songs, including "The Day Estival" descriptive of a summer day. Other works included the following:

- Thanks for the Deliverance of the Sicke
- Ane Epistle to Maister Gilbert Montcrief

== Family ==
His sister Janet Hume married Lord David Hume of Law.

He was married to Marion Duncanson, daughter of John Duncanson (1501–1601) Principal of St Leonard's College in St Andrews, and later Dean of the Chapel Royal in Stirling. They had two daughters, Dinah and Naomi, and one son Caleb Hume, and they lived together in Logie manse. The family were asked to leave the manse in June 1610 to accommodate the new minister but were compensated £60.

His great nephew was Patrick Hume, 1st Earl of Marchmont.

== See also ==
- Scottish literature
