= Alexander Lockhart, Lord Covington =

Scottish lawyer

The Hon Alexander Lockhart, Lord Covington also styled as Alexander Lockhart of Craighouse (1700–17 November 1782) was an 18th-century Scottish lawyer who rose to be a Senator of the College of Justice.

== Life ==
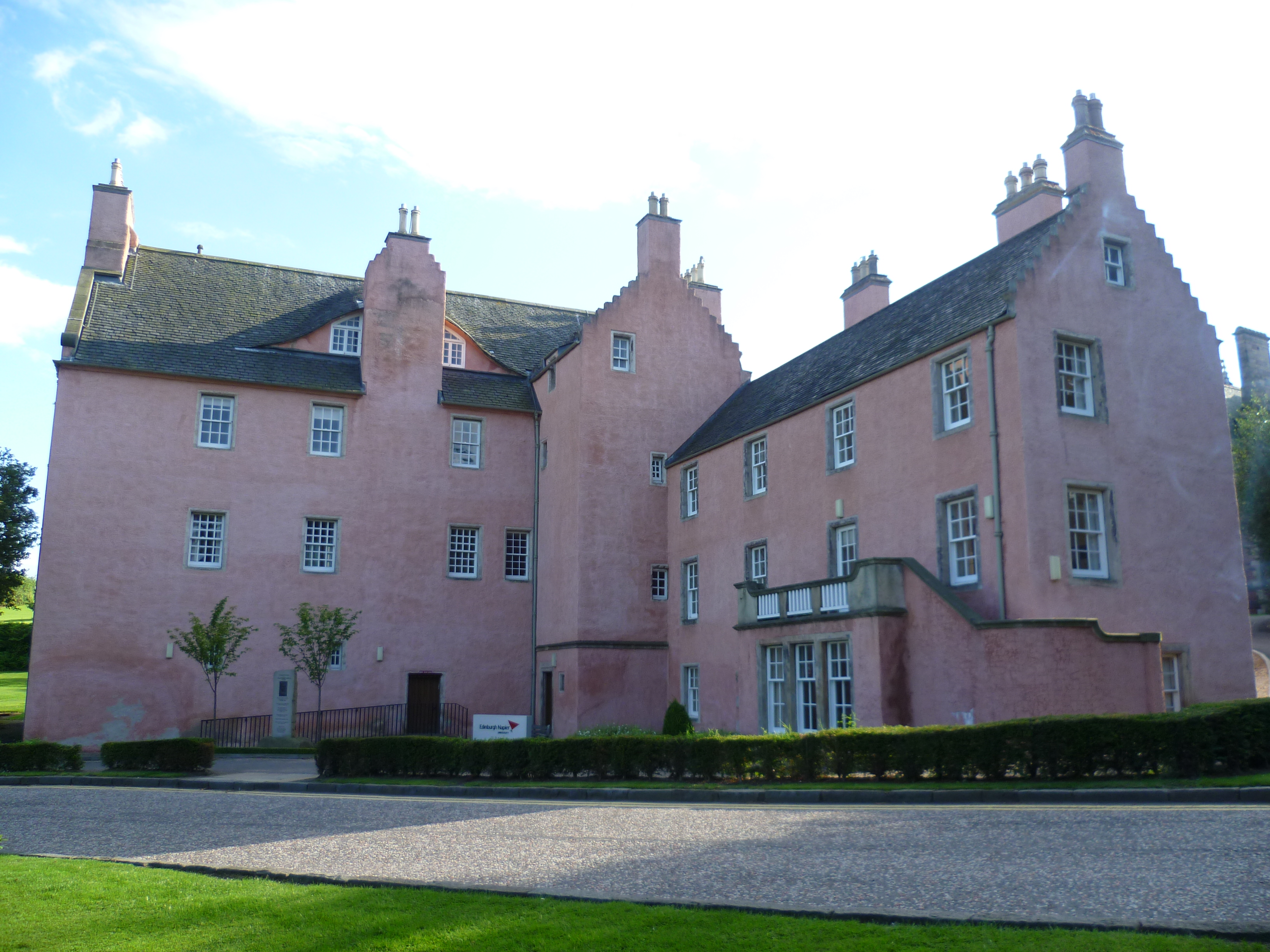
Old Craig House

He was the son of Euphemia Montgomery (d.1738) daughter of the Earl of Eglinton and her husband, George Lockhart of Carnwath (1673-1731). The family lived at Craig House, now known as Old Craig House, in south-west Edinburgh.

He studied law at the University of Edinburgh, and qualified as an advocate in 1722. In 1745 he oversaw the trial of several captured during the rebellion and imprisoned at Carlisle. In 1764 he was appointed Dean of the Faculty of Advocates.

In 1773 he was living at Adam's Court in old Edinburgh.

In March 1775 he became a Senator of the College of Justice following the death of Alexander Fraser, Lord Strichen. His title "Lord Covington" comes from a family estate near Biggar south-west of Edinburgh.

He died on 17 November 1782. His place as a Senator was filled by John Swinton, Lord Swinton.

== Family ==
His son was Thomas Lockhart (MP).

He had two daughters, Rebecca and Anne. Rebecca married James Hay, 15th Earl of Erroll. Anne married Charles Boyd (1728-1782) the brother of James Hay.

His sister Euphemia Lockhart became Countess of Wigton.

His half-sister Grace Lockhart married John Gordon, 3rd Earl of Aboyne and when widowed married James Stuart, 8th Earl of Moray.

His great-grandsons included William Lockhart (1820-1892). and John Gibson Lockhart.
