= Lord Polwarth =

Lordship of Polwarth
- Blazon: Quarterly: 1st and 4th Grandquarters: Quarterly: 1st, Vert a Lion rampant Argent (Hume); 2nd, Argent three Papingoes Vert (Pepdie); 3rd, Gules three Piles engrailed Argent (Polwarth); 4th, Argent a Cross engrailed Azure (St Clair of Herdmanston); over all on an Escutcheon Azure an Orange with the Stalk erect slipped and over it an Imperial Crown all proper; 2nd Grandquarter: Or two Mullets and a Crescent in base Azure (Scott of Harden); 3rd Grandquarter: Quarterly: 1st and 4th, Gules on a Chevron Argent a Rose between two Lioncels combatant of the first (Hepburne of Humbie); 2nd and 3rd, Argent three Dock Leaves Vert (Foulis).
- Creation date: 26 December 1690
- Created by: King William II and III
- Peerage: Peerage of Scotland
- First holder: Patrick Hume, 1st Lord Polwarth
- Present holder: Andrew Walter Hepburne-Scott, 11th Lord Polwarth
- Heir apparent: the Hon. William Henry Hepburne-Scott, Master of Polwarth
- Seat: Harden House
- Former seat: Marchmont House
- Motto: Fides Probata Coronas (Approved faith crowns)

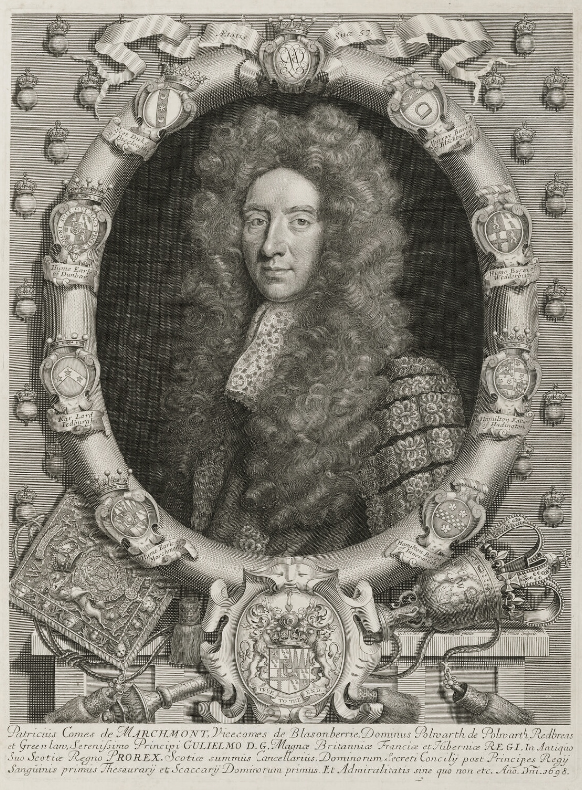
Patrick Hume, 1st Earl of Marchmont

Lord Polwarth, of Polwarth in the County of Berwick, is a title in the Peerage of Scotland. It was created in 1690 for Sir Patrick Hume of Polwarth, 2nd Baronet, Lord Chancellor of Scotland from 1696 to 1702 (the baronetcy had been created in the Baronetage of Nova Scotia in 1637 for his father and namesake Patrick Hume). In 1697 he was further created Lord Polwarth, of Polwarth, Redbraes and Greenlaw, Viscount of Blasonberrie and Earl of Marchmont, also in the Peerage of Scotland. Upon the death of his grandson, the third Earl, the creations of 1697 became dormant (unclaimed).

The claim to the lordship of 1690 was vested in his granddaughter, Anne Anstruther-Paterson (de jure 4th Lady Polwarth), daughter of Lady Anne Hume-Campbell, eldest daughter of the third Earl. However, she died before any decision on her claim to the peerage had been reached. On her death the claim to the title passed to her aunt Diana Scott (de jure 5th Lady Polwarth), youngest daughter of the third Earl, and then to her son Hugh Hepburne-Scott. In 1835, Hugh's claim to the peerage was allowed by the House of Lords. His son, the seventh Lord, was a Scottish representative peer from 1843 to 1867, and like his son, the eighth Lord, served as Lord Lieutenant of Selkirkshire. The latter's great-grandson, the tenth Lord, was a Scottish Representative Peer from 1945 to 1963, Governor of the Bank of Scotland from 1966 to 1972, and served in the Conservative administration of Edward Heath, as a Minister of State at the Scottish Office, from 1972 to 1974. As of 2017, the title is held by the latter's son, the eleventh Lord, who succeeded in 2005.

The heirs apparent to the Earls of Marchmont used the courtesy title Lord Polwarth.

The family seat now is Harden House, near Hawick, Roxburghshire. The former seat was Marchmont House, near Polwarth, Berwickshire. The other titles associated with the earldom derive from Greenlaw, four miles southwest of Polwarth, Redbraes Castle, the remains of which are immediately to the east of Marchmont House, and Blasonberry, which was located on the farm of Broomhill on the west bank of the Blackadder Water, quarter of a mile north of Greenlaw.

== Hume baronets, of Polwarth (1637) ==
- Sir Patrick Hume, 1st Baronet (died 1648)
- Sir Patrick Hume, 2nd Baronet (1641–1724) (created Lord Polwarth in 1697)

== Lords Polwarth (1690) ==
- Patrick Hume, 1st Lord Polwarth (1641–1724) (created Earl of Marchmont in 1697)

== Earls of Marchmont (1697) ==
- Patrick Hume, 1st Earl of Marchmont (1641–1724)
- Alexander Hume-Campbell, 2nd Earl of Marchmont (1676–1740)
- Hugh Hume-Campbell, 3rd Earl of Marchmont (1708–1794) (earldom dormant on his death)

== Lords Polwarth (1690) (continued) ==
- Anne Anstruther-Paterson, ''de jure'' 4th Lady Polwarth (died 1822)
- Diana Scott, ''de jure'' 5th Lady Polwarth (1735–1827)
- Hugh Scott, de jure later de facto 6th Lord Polwarth (1758–1841) (confirmed in title July 1835)
- Henry Francis Hepburne-Scott, 7th Lord Polwarth (1800–1867)
- Walter Hugh Hepburne-Scott, 8th Lord Polwarth (1838–1920) [Note that he describes himself as the 6th Lord Polwarth on the birth certificate of his son Robert Hepburne Scott, b. 01 May 1873]
- Walter George Hepburne-Scott, 9th Lord Polwarth (1864–1944)
- Henry Alexander Hepburne-Scott, 10th Lord Polwarth (1916–2005)
- Andrew Walter Hepburne-Scott, 11th Lord Polwarth (born 1947)

The heir apparent is the present holder's son Hon. William Henry Hepburne-Scott, Master of Polwarth (born 1973)
The heir apparent's heir apparent is his son Harry Walter Hepburne-Scott (born 2010)

== See also ==
- Marchmont House, Marchmont Estate
- List of places in the Scottish Borders
