= Polwarth Parish Church =

Coordinates: 55.7382°N 2.3997°W

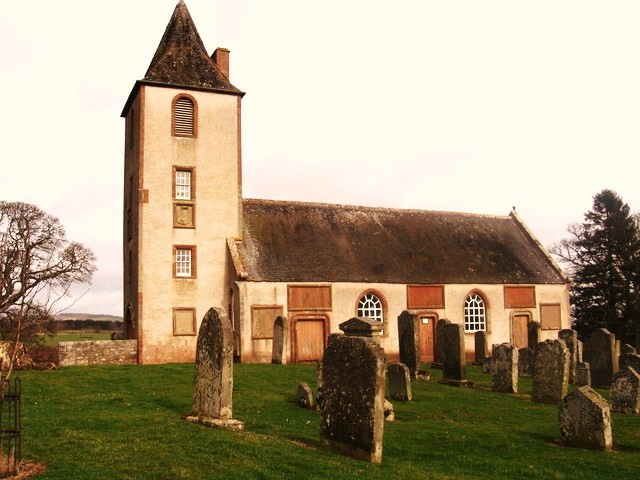
Polwarth Parish Church

Polwarth Parish Church was a member church (Scots: kirk) of the Church of Scotland before closing in 2004. It is situated atop a mound off a minor road leading from the A6105, Greenlaw to Duns road in the old county of Berwickshire, now privately owned by the Letts family who live in the adjacent Polwarth Manse and is available for weddings. It lies 4.0 miles (6.4 km) south–west of Duns and 3.5 miles (5.6 km) east of Greenlaw at grid reference NT749494.

== History ==
The origins of the kirk are somewhat vague though a plaque in the church buildings claims there was a church dedicated at Polwarth, Scottish Borders by 900AD. Unfortunately there are no records to substantiate that claim. The first records of the church comes in 1242AD when David de Bernham, bishop of St. Andrews, consecrated the church and dedicated to St. Kentigern. (St. Mungo)

In 1296, Adam Lamb was the Parson at the 'church of Paulesworth' when he swore fealty to King Edward I of England at Berwick upon Tweed. Three years later Edward presented William de Sandynstone to the living at Polwarth. The church of Polwarth was said to be in a ruinous state by 1378 but John de St. Clair of Herdmanstoun in East Lothian, a son–in–law of Sir Patrick Hume of Marchmont, came to the rescue and provided the means of re–building the church.

== Post–Reformation ==
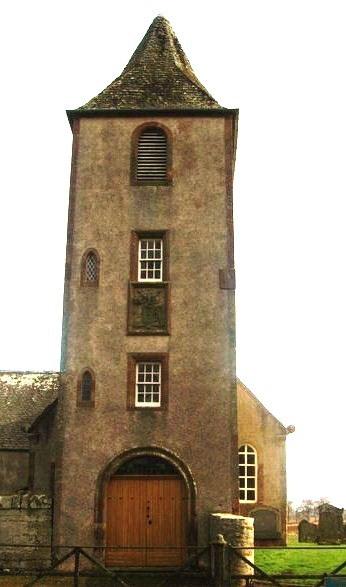
Tower at Polwarth Kirk

In 1567, Adam Hume, 3rd son of the 4th Baron of Polwarth was the first rector at the church after the Scottish Reformation. Later, in 1683, Sir Patrick Hume was implicated in the Rye House Plot and he hid for four weeks in the crypt at Polwarth Church to escape detection. His daughter, Grizel, later Lady Grizel Baillie took him food during his self-imposed imprisonment. The church was virtually rebuilt in 1703 on the same site as the previous churches and contains parts of the earlier buildings. Polwarth Kirk is protected as a category A listed building: "Prominently sited, well-detailed and surprisingly intact, Polwarth Church remains one of the most significant buildings in the parish and indeed, within Scotland as a whole". The church is built of rubble below a slated roof. The 'T' shape building is highlighted by a four–stage tower, and the interior was extensively renovated in the 20th century. The church also contains the Marchmont family crypt which can be seen through a grille at the bottom of the east wall.

== List of post–Reformation ministers ==
- 1567 Adam Hume
- 1593 Alexander Gaittis
- 1604 Alexander Cass
- 1652 David Robertson
- 1664 George Holiwell

== See also ==
- List of places in the Scottish Borders
- List of places in Scotland
- Rye House Plot
