= Mellerstain House =

Country house in the Scottish Borders, Scotland

Coordinates: 55.6442°N 2.562°W

Designations

Inventory of Gardens and Designed Landscapes in Scotland
- Official name: Mellerstain
- Designated: 30 June 1987
- Reference no.: GDL00280

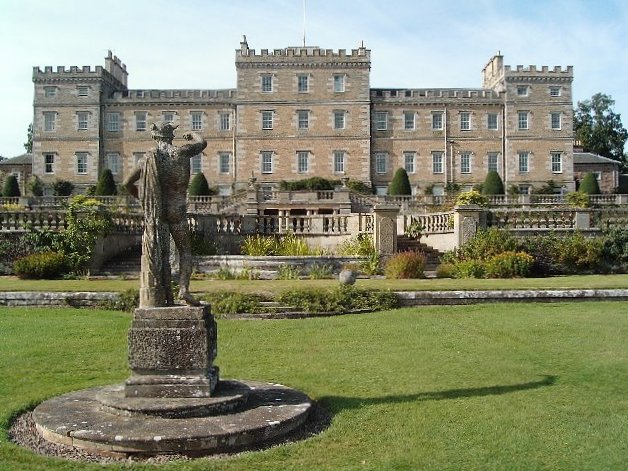
Mellerstain House, viewed from the lawn to the south east.

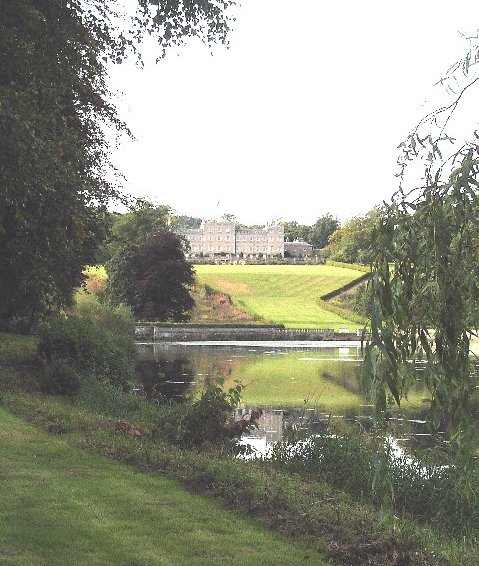
Mellerstain Lake, looking north, with the house seen in the distance.

Mellerstain House is a Scottish country house around 8 miles (13 kilometres) north of Kelso in the Borders, Scotland. It is currently the home of George Baillie-Hamilton, 14th Earl of Haddington, and is designated as a historical monument.

== History ==
The older house or castle at Mellerstain included an old five-storey tower, ruinous in 1700. Mellerstain was built between 1725 and 1778. The architect William Adam initially designed the east and west wings for George Baillie (1664–1738) and his wife Lady Grisell (1665–1746), daughter of Patrick Hume, Earl of Marchmont. Work ceased after the wings were completed, and it was another 45 years before George Baillie commissioned Robert Adam to design and build the main mansion house. George was the second son of Charles, Lord Binning (1697–1732), heir to the 6th Earl of Haddington, and he inherited the Mellerstain estate when his aunt Grisell, Lady Murray, died in 1759. He had changed his name from Hamilton to Baillie as a mark of respect.

== Architectural description ==
Mellerstain House was designed in Robert Adam's 'Castle' style, indeed it is one of the very first buildings designed by him in this manner. The main block is of an 'E' form to the north, with the central three-bay projection considerably deeper than the east and west projections of two bays. The south front has matching projections but much shallower. The central and end projections are a floor higher than the remainder.

This main block is connected to two pavilions by short straight linking corridors, but there is an unusual history here, as the pavilions were completed some forty years beforehand in 1725–29. A design existed by Robert's father, William Adam, but it was never built. This presented Robert Adam with some problems. As the pavilions were quite widely spaced, Adam's solution was to create a fairly long narrow house.

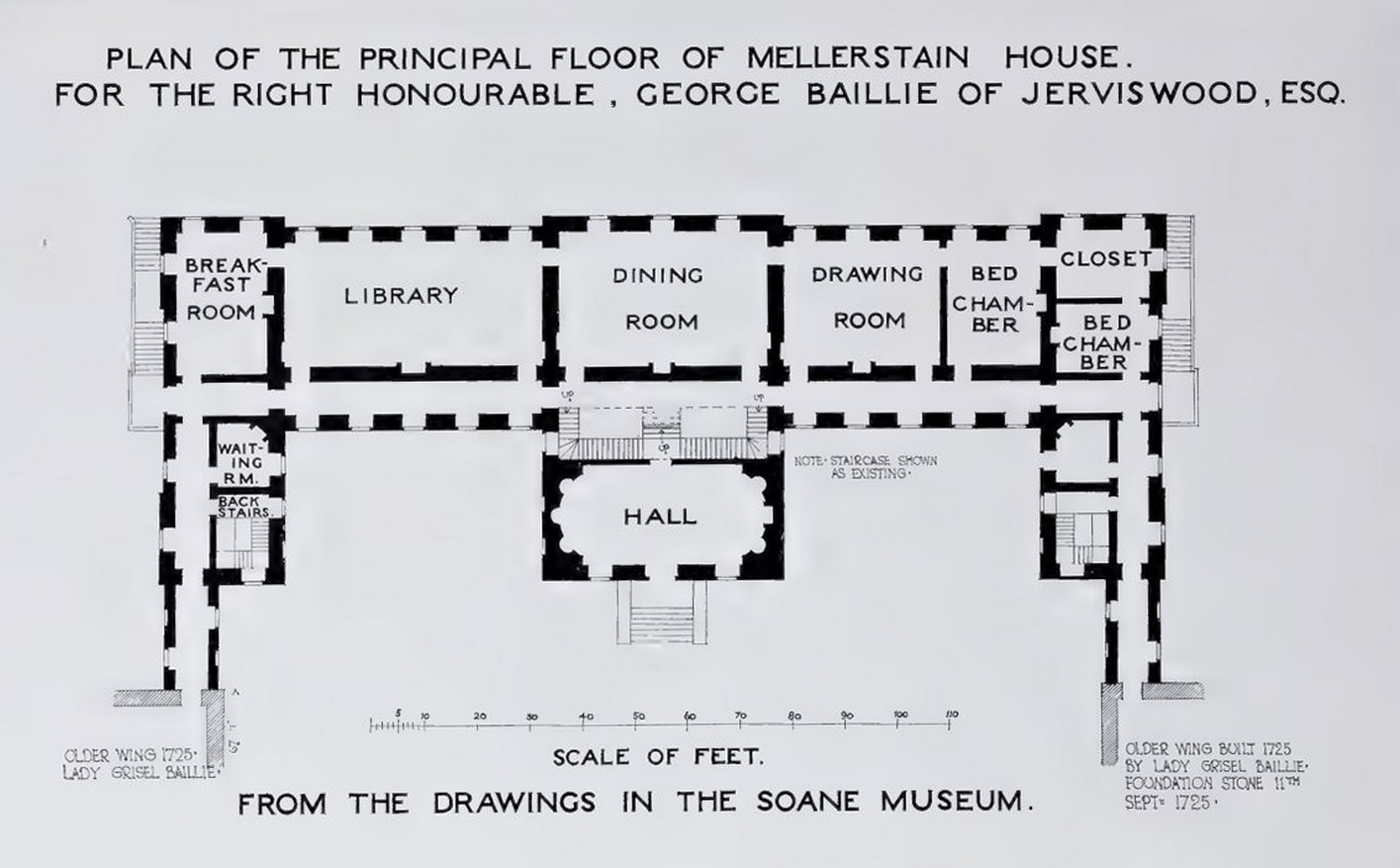
Mellerstain, floor plan from Bolton

As a result, over most of its length, the house is only one room deep with a long corridor on the north side (see Plan). That Adam did not follow the more conventional design of linking the pavilions with quadrants, enabling a more compact house design, may have been due to the considerable slope of the ground. As it is, to the north side the basement floor is mostly sunk, to the south it is wholly above ground level.

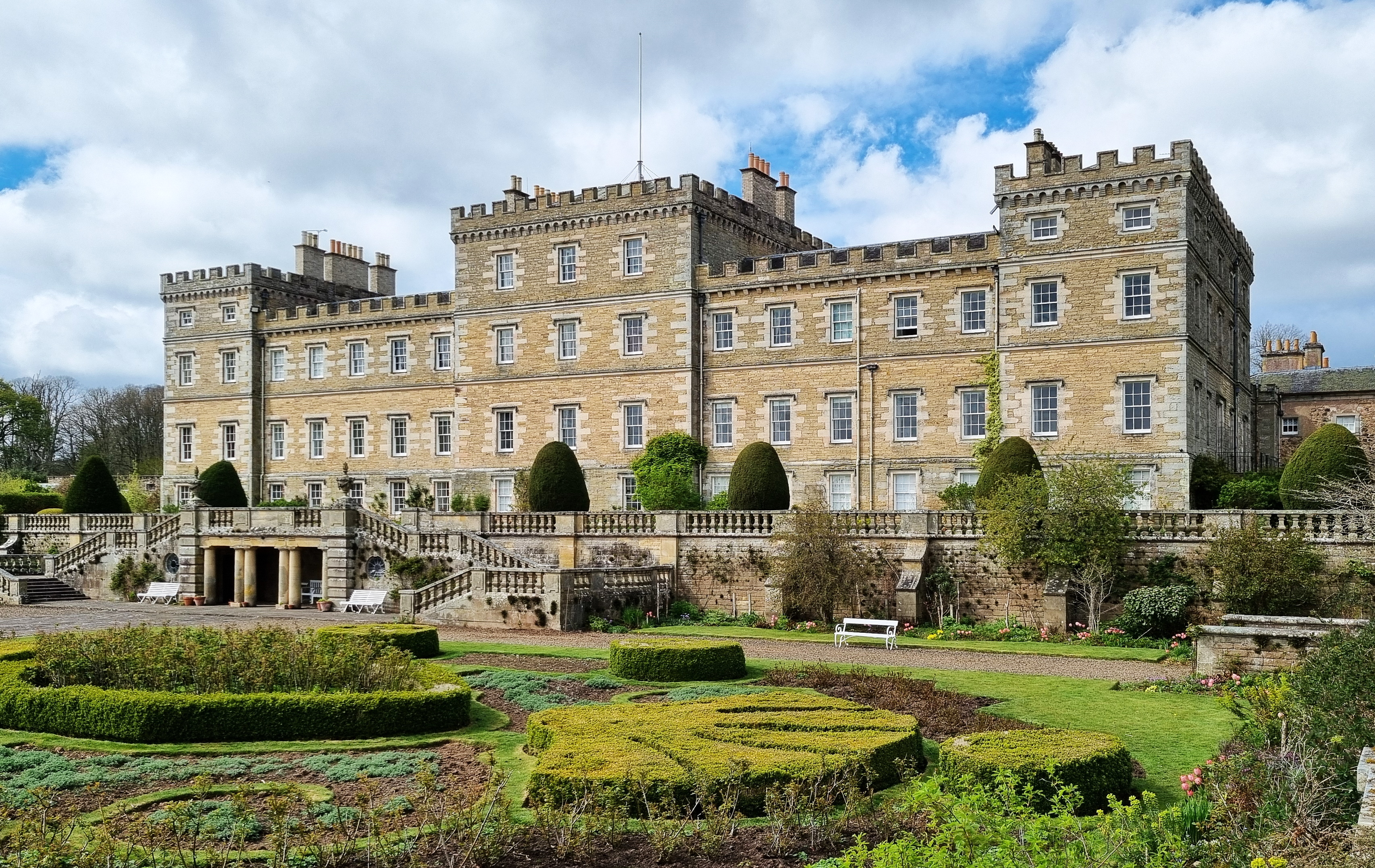
Mellerstain - South front, with later formal garden

The exterior of the house is quite severe, with a very regular pattern of fenestration with multi-pane sashes under hood mouldings, topped by battlements with regular crenellations over a corbel table. The facings apart from the quoins and window surrounds are in an irregular 'drove' (rough chiselled) stone, but not as coarse as the pavilions which are faced in essentially random rubble. Adam's design drawing shows the pavilions dressed in the same manner as the central block, but this was never enacted. Short low corridor wings connect the main block to the pavilions. The family lived in the east pavilion until the main house was built in the 1770s and this wing still has well proportioned rooms.

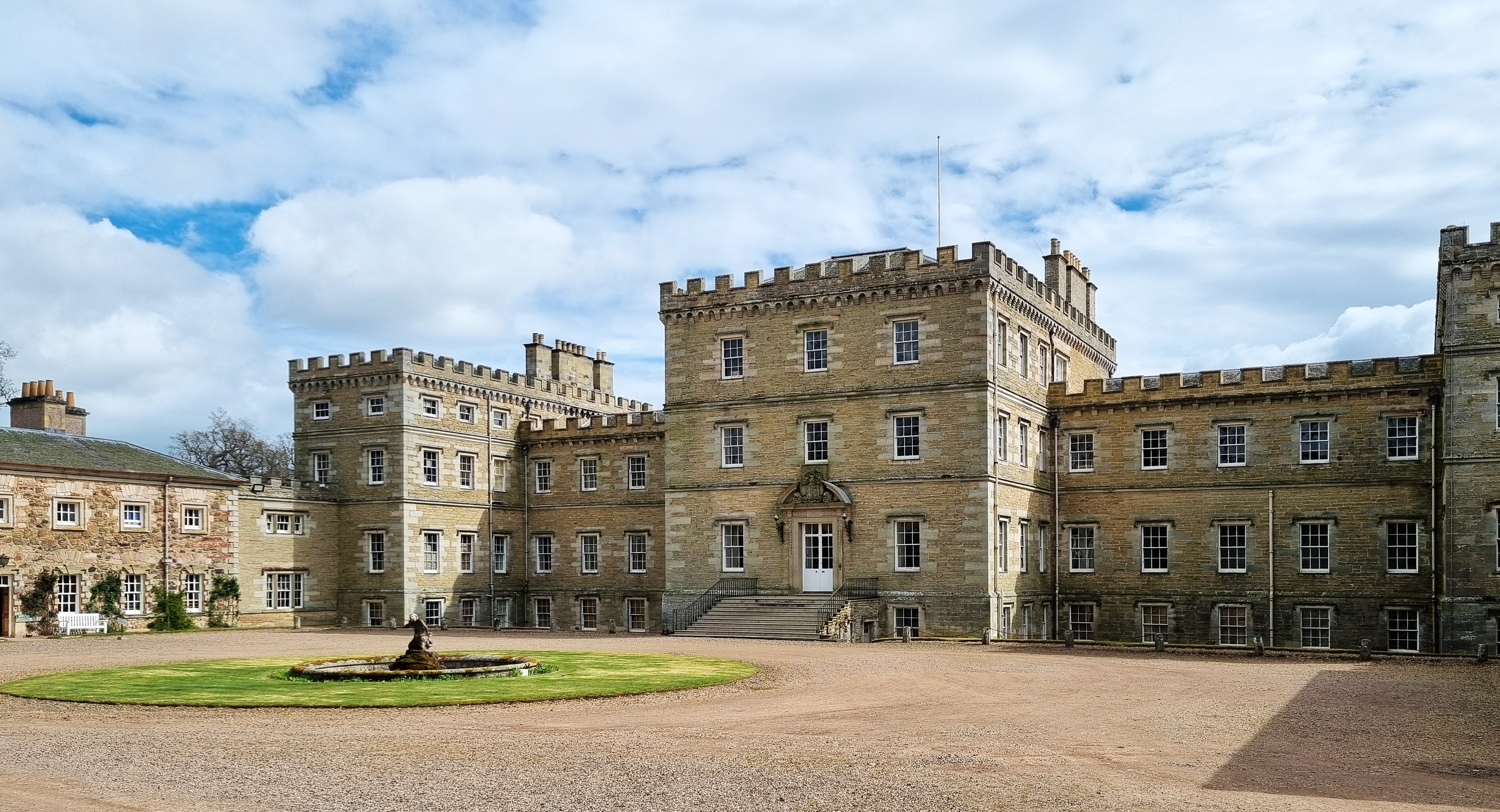
Mellerstain, north front, with part of east pavilion

In the Interior, in contrast to the exterior, the main glory of the house is perhaps the Adam designed plasterwork. Seven rooms have fully credited Adam designing ceilings and wall decorations in his classic light and airy manner. The interior is a masterpiece of delicate and colourful plasterwork, comprising a small sitting room (originally a breakfast room), a beautiful library (a double cube design), a music room (originally the dining room), the main drawing room, with original silk brocade wall coverings, a small drawing room (originally a bed chamber) and a small library (originally two dressing rooms). The finest room is the Library, where the decoration apart from the bookshelves, comprises on the walls a series of four bas relief stucco panels alternated with busts by Scheemakers and Roubiliac in paired niches. The ceiling features a central painted roundel in oils. The room "may be counted as among the very finest work of Adam's mature period." Beard.

The principal rooms are on the ground floor above the basement and follow the classic 'enfilade' arrangement, the main rooms originally being in the order from east to west the Library, Dining Room, Drawing Room and Bed Chamber. To the north, the Hall fills the central projecting wing, the staircase being sandwiched between this and the Dining Room. Because of the limited space, the staircase itself is of a quite unusual design (illustrated in Bolton p257), consisting of two flights which meet in the centre of the north wall followed by a short return bridge to the first floor corridor. The first floor contains bedrooms. Original wallpapers, hand printed in the 18th and 19th centuries, can be seen in the bedrooms.

A surprising feature of the house is the large Gallery which occupied the whole of the top floor above the central block. It seems it was certainly designed by Adam, as the house contains an elaborate ceiling design for the space but which was not executed. The purpose of this Gallery is puzzling, it might have been thought it was for dancing or entertainment, but it is only approached by a very narrow stair quite inappropriate for the full ladies' dress designs of the time. Also, there are no services off it. On the other hand, a gallery on the top floor is a feature in many Scottish castles which may be the simple explanation. The Gallery displays costumes, fans, embroideries and documents.

The Adam 'Castle' style and Mellerstain While Mellerstain fits within Robert Adam's castle style, the design is untypical of most of Adam's later 'castles'. With its highly regular and imposing appearance, it is somewhat in contrast to later castles such as Douglas Castle (demolished), Oxenfoord, Caldwell and especially Culzean Castle in Ayrshire. (King op cit, Chapter 5, p156-178) Adam's later designs generally encompassed far more irregular, often Gothic, three dimensional forms, with towers, turrets, bartizans as well as battlements. The inspiration for these designs can be seen in Adam's sketchbooks, where numerous drawings show imaginary castles in landscapes of hills, mountains, rivers, waterfalls and lakes. Many examples of these picturesque drawings and watercolours can be seen on the National Galleries of Scotland website.

== Gardens ==
The House stands in 1,413 hectares of parkland, with an Italianate formal terraced garden in front of the south front. A sweeping stretch of lawn descends to a lake. The original formal landscape was designed by William Adam, who had been involved in the 1725 House design. He created a long, tree-lined avenue leading to an ornamental canal and then in the distance to an 'eye catcher', the 'Hundy Mundy' tower, a tall Gothic folly consisting of an archway with square turreted towers, some 2.5 kilometres away. To the north, he created a long straight road to east and west to approach the House.

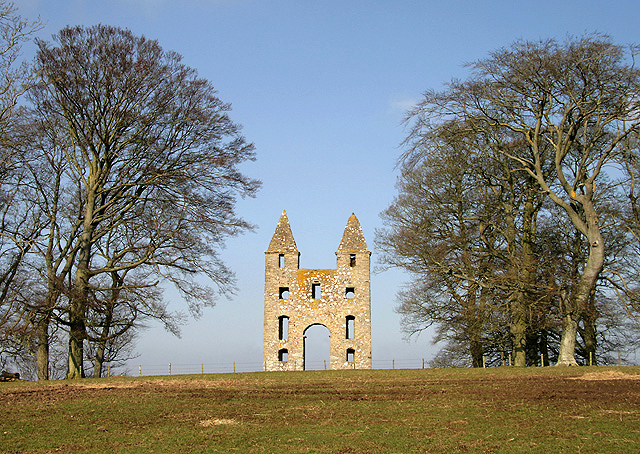
The Hundy Mundy Gothic Folly

This design remains in essence, although some changes took place in the 19th century, in particular the road to the north was realigned to create a more informal approach to the House. The greatest change to the landscape took place in the early 20th century when Sir Reginald Bloomfield was commissioned to design impressive formal terraces immediately in front of the House, these being a major example of Edwardian garden design. He also altered the formal canal, raising the water level to create a lake which remains. His terraces step down through three levels, with staircases, balustrading, parterres, statues and a pond before opening out to the wide grassed area leading to the lake. Apparently the original design included further terraces reaching as far as the lake, but these were never built (HES, op cit). There are various other buildings throughout the grounds, for example a Mausoleum, stables, cottages and a walled garden.
