= George Swinton (artist) =

Canadian artist, writer, collector (1917–2002)

- Born: George Henry Gordon Swinton; 17 April 1917; Vienna, Austria
- Died: 21 April 2002 (aged 85); Winnipeg, Manitoba
- Education: B.A. degree in economics and political science from McGill University, Montreal (1946); Montreal School of Art and Design (1946–1947); Art Students League, New York (1949–1950)
- Known for: artist, historian, writer, collector
- Awards: Order of Canada (1980)

George Swinton CM RCA L.L. D. (17 April 1917 – 21 April 2002) was a Canadian painter, historian, and one of the earliest writers and collectors of Inuit art. His book Eskimo Sculpture was published in 1965. A second book Sculpture of the Eskimo followed in 1972, a third Sculpture of the Inuit in 1999.

== Life and career ==
Swinton was born in Vienna, Austria, under the name Georg Heinz Schwitzer. In 1935/36, he studied agriculture at the BOKU (nowadays University of Natural Resources and Life Sciences), from 1936 to 1938 Economics and Political Science at the College for World Trade (Hochschule für Welthandel, nowadays Vienna University of Economics and Business). After the "Anschluss" of Austria to the "Third Reich" (March 1938), he emigrated with his family via the United Kingdom to Canada (1939). He served five years with the Canadian Intelligence Corps in the Canadian Army, becoming a Canadian citizen in 1944. He received his B.A. degree in economics and political science from McGill University, Montreal (1946); then studied at the Montreal School of Art and Design (1946–1947) and Art Students League, New York (1949–1950).

He was hired as the curator of the Saskatoon Art Centre (1947–1949), then taught at Smith College in Massachusetts (1950–1953) and was an artist-in-residence at Queen's University (1953–1954). From 1954 to 1974, he taught at the School of Art at the University of Manitoba. He first travelled north for the Hudson's Bay Company in 1957. From 1974 to 1981, he taught Canadian Studies at Carleton University, then served as an adjunct professor in the Department of Art History at Carleton University from 1981 to 1985.

Swinton was the author of Eskimo Sculpture (1965), Sculpture of the Eskimo (1972), Sculpture of the Inuit (1992), and other books and articles on the subject. Sculpture of the Eskimo was reviewed by a peer, William E. Taylor Jr., the archaeologist and director from 1967 to 1983 of the National Museum of Man (now the Canadian Museum of History), in 1972 as "the most comprehensive statement on Canadian Eskimo sculpture and the best representative collection of photographs of the sculptures themselves" and Swinton's text as "personal, committed, vigorous and wide-ranging".

== Death ==
In 2002, he died due to complications caused by congestive heart failure in Winnipeg.

== Art work ==
In watercolours and paintings of landscapes, Swinton revealed his love of the prairie. In 1958, he had an exhibition of his paintings at the Art Gallery of Greater Victoria.

== Selected public collections ==
- National Gallery of Canada
- Art Gallery of Greater Victoria
- Vancouver Art Gallery
- Winnipeg Art Gallery

== Selected honours ==
- Order of Canada (1980)
- Honorary Degree, University of Manitoba (1987)
- 125th Anniversary of Canadian Confederation Medal (1992)
- Queen Elizabeth II Golden Jubilee Medal (2002)
