= John Swinton (died 1679) =

Scottish politician

John Swinton (1621?–1679) was a Scottish politician active during the Wars of the Three Kingdoms and during the Interregnum. At the Restoration he was found guilty of treason and was imprisoned for some years before being released. In later life he became a Quaker.

== Early life ==
Swinton, born about 1621, was the eldest son of Sir Alexander Swinton of Swinton, by his wife Margaret, daughter of James Home of Framepath, Berwickshire.

Sir Alexander Swinton, who was sheriff of Berwickshire in 1640 and M.P. for the county in 1644–1645, died in 1652. Alexander Swinton (1625?–1700) was John's younger brother. John received "as good an education as any man in Scotland", and devoted his attention especially to law.

== Wars of the Three Kingdoms ==
In 1646 and 1647 his name appears on the committee of war for Berwickshire, together with that of his father.

In 1649 Swinton was returned to parliament for The Merse, and in that capacity opposed the despatch of a deputation to Breda to treat with Charles II. His political views were tinged by strong religious feeling. In the following year he opposed the immediate levy of an army to oppose Oliver Cromwell's invasion of Scotland, and made common cause with those who urged that means must first be taken to purge out from the troops any who had signed the Engagement or otherwise shown signs of being influenced by carnal motives.

In February 1649 Swinton had been appointed a lieutenant-colonel with the command of a troop of horse (cavalry). After the Battle of Dunbar, his sympathies lay with the Remonstraters, and soon after the defeat of the Western Association at the Battle of Hamilton he defected to Olive Cromwell's invading English Army. In consequence of his defection, on 30 January 1651 he was sentenced of death and forfeiture was pronounced against him by the Scottish parliament at Perth, and he was excommunicated by the Kirk.

Swinton was present at the Battle of Worcester on 3 September 1651, but took no part in the conflict, in which two of his brothers were engaged on the Scottish side, and in which Robert, the younger, lost his life in an attempt to capture Cromwell's standard.

== Interregnum ==
Cromwell's victory at Worcester gave Swinton complete control of the Scottish government, and he proceeded to remodel the administration. According to Bishop Gilbert Burnet, Swinton was "the man of all Scotland most trusted and employed by Cromwell". In May 1652 he was appointed a commissioner for the administration of justice in Scotland, having for colleagues Sir John Hope (1605?–1654), Sir William Lockhart (1621–1676), and four Englishmen of less note. In the following year he was appointed one of the five Scottish commissioners to consider the terms of union with England and in 1655 he was named a member of the council of state for Scotland. He also sat in the English parliaments of Oliver and Richard Cromwell as one of the Scottish representatives, and served regularly on the committee for Scottish affairs. He was a member of several other committees on English affairs, including that appointed by the nominated parliament of 1653 which recommended the abolition of tithes.

In acknowledgement of his services the English government were careful of Swinton's private interests. On 4 November 1656, by order of council, the sentence of forfeiture pronounced on him by the Scottish parliament was revoked, and he was further recompensed by a part of the Earl of Lauderdale's forfeited estates (see Cromwell's Act of Grace).

== Restoration ==
The restoration of the monarchy under Charles II proved fatal to his fortunes. On 20 July 1660 he was arrested in London in the house of a Quaker in King Street, Westminster, sent to Leith in the frigate HMS Eagle together with the Marquess of Argyll, and confined in the Tolbooth at Edinburgh. Brought to trial for high treason in the beginning of 1661, he was condemned to forfeiture and imprisonment in Edinburgh Castle. He was imprisoned for some years, and after his release his life was passed in wanderings, chiefly in Scotland. He had in 1657 embraced the tenets of the Quakers, and he adopted their belief with the same enthusiasm which he had at one time shown in the cause of the Covenant. He was several times arrested in company with his fellow-believers, but invariably obtained his release. He died at Borthwick early in 1679.

== Works ==
Swinton was the author of several Quaker pamphlets:

1. A Testimony for the Lord by John Swinton (not dated), 4to.
2. Some late Epistles to the Body, writ from Time to Time as the Spirit gave Utterance, 1663, 4to.
3. One Warning more to the Hypocrites of this Generation, 1663.
4. To all the Friends to Truth in the Nations (not dated), fol.
5. Words in Season, 1663, 4to.
6. Heaven, Earth, Sea, and Dry Land, hear the Word of the Lord, 1664, fol.
7. To my Kinsmen, my Relations, mine Acquaintance after the Flesh, 1666, fol.
8. Innocency further cleared, 1673, 4to.

Most of these tracts and broadsides, together with several manuscripts, are in the Library of the Religious Society of Friends in London.

== Family ==
He married, first, in 1645, Margaret, daughter of William Stewart, 2nd Lord Blantyre, and first cousin of Frances Teresa Stuart, duchess of Richmond and Lennox. She died in 1662, leaving three sons—Alexander, John, and Isaac—and a daughter Margaret. Swinton married, secondly, Frances White of Newington Butts, a widow whose maiden name was Hancock, they had no children.
