= Patrick Hume, 1st Earl of Marchmont =

Scottish statesman (1641–1724)

The Right Honourable The Earl of Marchmont
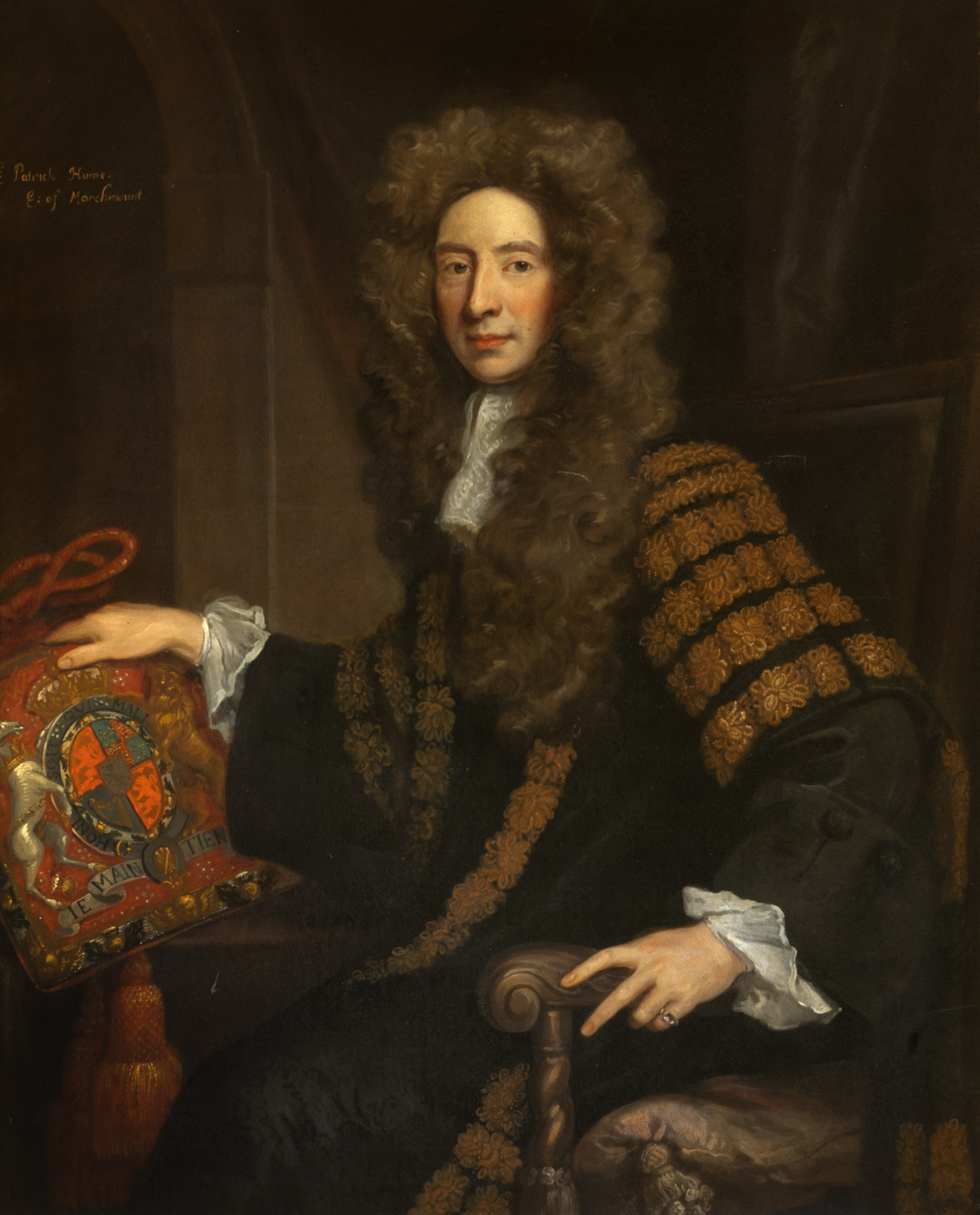
- Portrait by Sir Godfrey Kneller

Lord Chancellor of Scotland
- In office 1696–1702
- Monarch: William II
- Preceded by: The Marquess of Tweeddale
- Succeeded by: The Earl of Seafield

Personal details
- Born: 13 January 1641 Polwarth, Berwickshire, Scotland
- Died: 2 August 1724 (aged 83) Berwick-on-Tweed, Great Britain
- Resting place: Canongate Kirkyard, Edinburgh
- Spouse: Grizel Ker
- Children: 9, including Andrew, Grizel, and Julian
- Education: University of Paris

Military service
- Battles/wars: Argyll's Rising; Glorious Revolution

Patrick Hume, 1st Earl of Marchmont (13 January 1641 – 2 August 1724), known as Sir Patrick Hume, 2nd Baronet from 1648 to 1690 and as Lord Polwarth from 1690 to 1697, was a Scottish statesman. His grandfather was the poet and courtier Sir Patrick Hume of Polwarth and Redbraes who died in 1609.

== Life ==
Born at Polwarth, Berwickshire, he was raised as a strict Presbyterian, and after a term of law study at Paris he became a member of the Scottish parliament in 1665 as shire commissioner for Berwickshire, where he at once took a foremost place as defender of the Covenanters. He went so far as to bring imprisonment upon himself, and on being freed was suspected of complication in the Rye House Plot, so that he was forced to remain in hiding until he could escape in disguise to the Netherlands.

There, he joined Archibald Campbell, 9th Earl of Argyll and embarked with him on the unsuccessful 1685 expedition to Scotland. Hume became a refugee with a price set upon his head; but he once more escaped abroad and lived at Utrecht under the name "Dr. Wallace," professing to be a Scottish surgeon. He returned with William of Orange at the Revolution of 1688, and once again joined the Scottish parliament as the commissioner for Berwickshire until becoming Lord Polwarth in 1690.

With his estates restored and now a Scottish peer, he was made Lord Chancellor in 1696 and Earl of Marchmont in 1697, although when Anne came to the throne in 1702 he lost his chancellorship.

He strenuously opposed in Parliament the claims of the Old Pretender to the crown and voted for the union of Scotland with England, though he was not above the suspicion of having received a reward for so doing. An investigation in 1711 indicated the Earl received £1104 15s 7d (approx. £176 000 - as of Aug 2024) as an inducement to support the Union. From the list of names published, he received the highest amount. Too dogmatic to be popular, he did not hold office in Great Britain until the reign of George I, when he was given some minor charges, but shortly afterwards retired. Hume was an active freemason, he belonged to the Lodge of Edinburgh (Mary's Chapel) since 1667.

== Family ==
At least six of his children died in infancy and were buried in the Foulis tomb in Greyfriars Kirkyard. His son, Sir Andrew Hume, later Lord Kimmerghame, served as a commissioner in parliament for Kirkcudbright.

He was great-nephew to both Patrick Hume of Polwarth and Rev Alexander Hume.

His eldest daughter, Grisell Hume (later Lady Grisell Baillie) wrote the popular 17th century song "Werna my Heart Licht I Wad Dee" (Were not My Heart Light I would Die). Another daughter, Julian, married Charles Billingham, an English soldier.

== Arms ==
Coat of arms of Patrick Hume, 1st Earl of Marchmont
Crest Out of a Human Heart a Dexter Arm erect holding a Scimitar all proper. Escutcheon Quarterly, 1st and 4th grand quarters counterquartered, 1st and 4th, Vert a Lion rampant Argent armed and langued Gules (Hume), 2nd and 3rd, Argent three Popinjays Vert beaked and membered Gules (Pepdie); 2nd grand quarter, Argent three Piles engrailed Gules issuing from the chief (Polwarth); 3rd grand quarter, Argent a Cross engrailed Azure (St Clair); over all in the centre an Escutcheon Argent charged with an Orange proper stalked and slipped Vert ensigned with an Imperial Crown proper. Supporters On either side a Lion reguardant Argent armed and langued Gules. Motto True to the end.

== Sources ==
- Leigh Rayment's Peerage Pages
- Lee, Sidney, ed. (1891). "Hume, Patrick (1641-1724)" . Dictionary of National Biography. Vol. 28. London: Smith, Elder & Co.

Political offices
Preceded by The Marquess of Tweeddale	Lord Chancellor of Scotland; 1696–1702	Succeeded by The Earl of Seafield
Peerage of Scotland
New creation	Earl of Marchmont; 1697–1724	Succeeded by Alexander Hume-Campbell
New creation	Lord Polwarth; 1690–1724	Succeeded by Alexander Hume-Campbell
Baronetage of Nova Scotia
Preceded by Patrick Hume	Baronet (of Polwarth); 1648–1724	Succeeded by Alexander Hume-Campbell
Military offices
Preceded by Marquess of Lothian	Colonel of the 7th Regiment of Dragoons; 1707–1709	Succeeded by William Kerr
