= John Swinton (died 1723) =

Scottish politician

Sir John Swinton of Swinton (of Swinton, Berwickshire) sometimes called John Swinton of that Ilk was a Scottish politician.

== Biography ==
He was born before 1662, the second son of John Swinton, of Swinton in Berwickshire, and his wife Margaret, daughter of William Stewart, 2nd Lord Blantyre. Swinton's father had become a Quaker, was an active politician during the Protectorate, and had had his estates forfeited at the Restoration.

The younger Swinton, who remained a Presbyterian, became a successful merchant in the Netherlands. He succeeded his elder brother as head of the family in 1687 and returned to Scotland at the time of the Glorious Revolution, of which his uncle Lord Mersington was a supporter. In 1689 he was appointed a commissioner of supply for Berwickshire, and the following year he was restored to his father's estates. From 1690 until 1707 he was a commissioner for Berwickshire in the Parliament of Scotland. He became a director of the Company of Scotland and of the Bank of Scotland in 1695, incurring huge losses during the Darien Scheme. As he is also one of the signatories on the Act of Union of 1707 this means he was one of the several persons who were fully compensated for their losses in return for signing the Union with England. As such he was one of those Parcel of Rogues referred to in the bitter poem by Robert Burns.

He was knighted before September 1696 and made a burgess of Edinburgh in 1707. Swinton supported the Act of Union 1707, and was one of the Scottish representatives to the first Parliament of Great Britain and a commissioner of the Equivalent. He did not stand for Berwickshire at the election of 1708, but remained on the Equivalent commission until it was dissolved in 1719. He supported the Hanoverian succession in 1714.

Swinton was married firstly in 1674 to Sarah, daughter of William Welch of London; they had one daughter. His wife died in about 1690, and he was married secondly on 17 February 1698 to Anne, daughter of Sir Robert Sinclair, 1st Baronet of Longformacus. They had four sons and three daughters. Sir John Swinton died in 1723 and was succeeded by his eldest son John.
