= Lady Grizel Baillie =

Scottish songwriter (1665–1746)

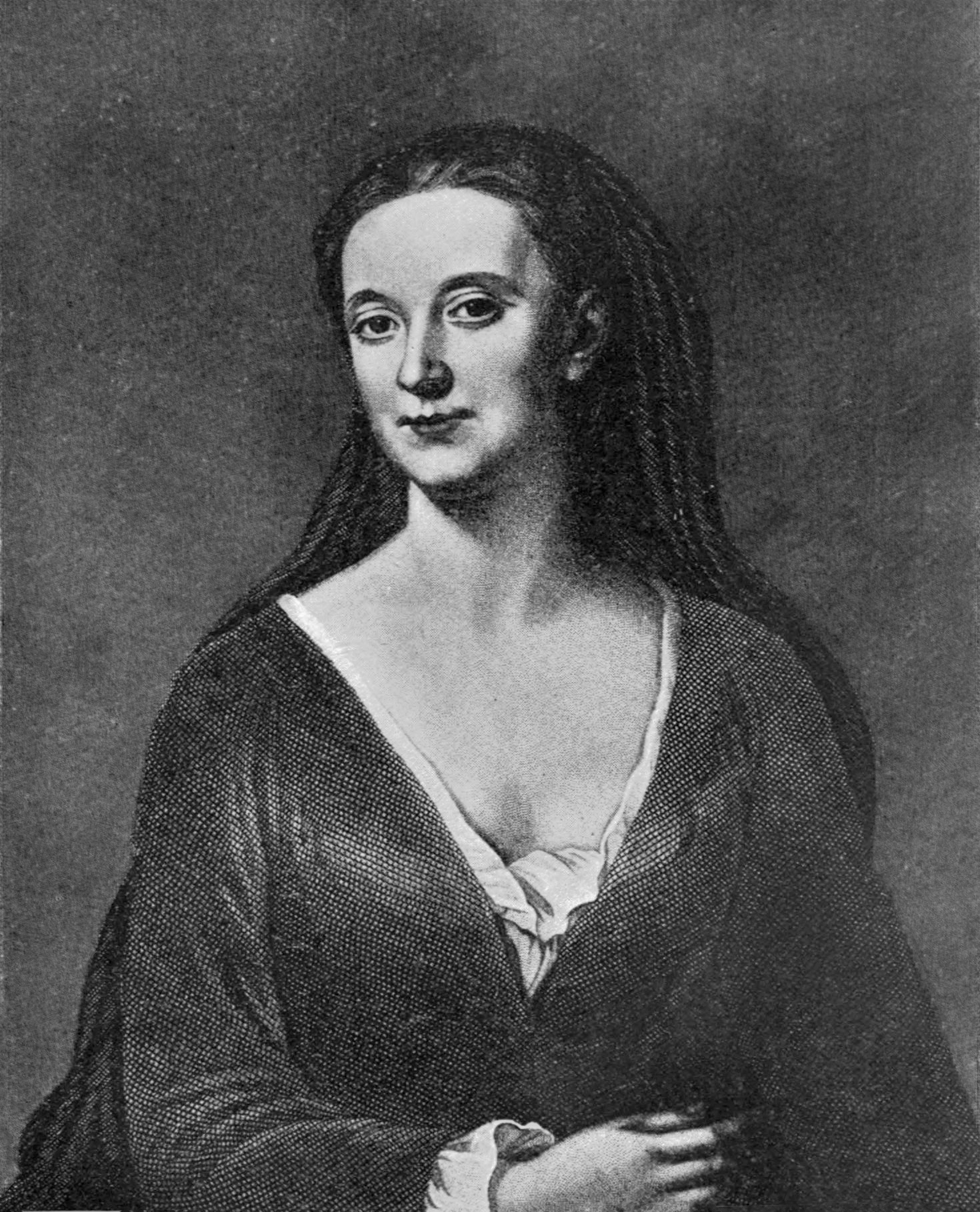
- Engraving by G. J. Stodart after Maria Verelst portrait, Mellerstain House
- Born: Grizel Hume; 25 December 1665; Redbraes Castle, Berwickshire
- Died: 6 December 1746 (aged 80); London
- Occupation: songwriter
- Notable work: Were na my heart licht I wad die

Lady Grizel Baillie (née Hume, 25 December 1665 – 6 December 1746) was a Scottish gentlewoman and songwriter. Her accounting ledgers, in which she kept details about her household for more than 50 years, provide information about social life in Scotland in the eighteenth century.

== Biography ==
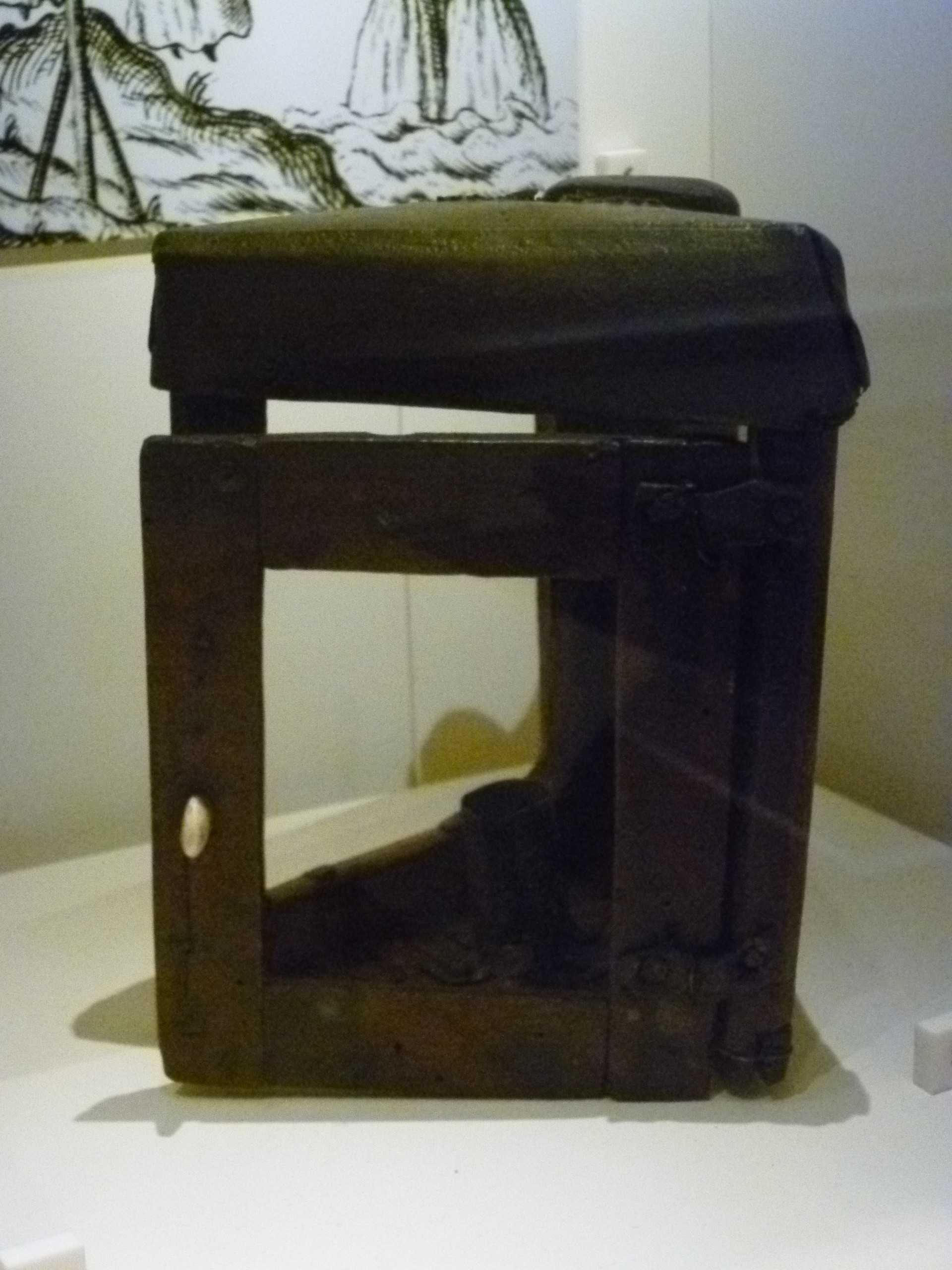
The lantern teenaged Hume used when visiting her father in hiding, Museum of Scotland

Born at Redbraes Castle, Berwickshire, Grizel Hume was the eldest daughter of Grisell Ker and Sir Patrick Hume (later Earl of Marchmont). When she was twelve years old, she carried letters from her father to a Scottish conspirator in the Rye House Plot, Robert Baillie of Jerviswood, who was then in prison. Hume's sympathy for Baillie made him a suspected man and the king's troops occupied Redbraes Castle. He remained in hiding for some time in the crypt of Polwarth Church, where his daughter smuggled food to him; but on hearing of the execution of Baillie (1684), he fled to the United Provinces, where his family joined him soon after. They returned to Scotland after the Glorious Revolution.

In 1692, Lady Grizel married George Baillie, son of Robert. The couple had first met when they were twelve and supposedly, fell in love at that point. What is known for certain is that after returning to Scotland, Lady Grizel turned down the offer to be one of Queen Mary's maids of honour, and insisted to her parents on marrying Baillie over a more advantageous match. The couple had two daughters: Grizel (1692–1759), who married British Army officer Sir Alexander Murray of Stanhope in 1710; and Rachel (1696–1773), who married Charles Lord Binning in 1717 (and whose son Thomas became the seventh Earl of Haddington). They also had a short-lived son, Robert (23 February 1694 – 28 February 1696).

She died in London on 6 December 1746, and was buried at Mellerstain on 25 December, her eighty-first birthday.

== Works ==
=== Songs ===
Her elder daughter, Lady Grizel Murray of Stanhope, had in her possession a manuscript in prose and verse of her mother's songs. Some of them had been printed in Allan Ramsay's, Tea-Table Miscellany. The most famous of Lady Grizel's Scots songs, "And werena my heart light I wad dee", originally appeared in William Thomson's Orpheus Caledonius, or a Collection of the Best Scotch Songs (1725).

=== Household books ===
Lady Grizel Baillie's account books, meticulously kept from 1692 to 1746, reveal information about social life in Scotland in the eighteenth century. Her entries begin late into her first year of marriage and end just before her death. They consist of more than a thousand pages of entries. In 1911 the Scottish Historical Society published a 400-page scholarly edition of Lady Grizel Baillie's accounts, edited by Robert Scott-Moncrieff. This edition focused mainly on the entries from 1692 to 1718, which give extensive details about the early years of the Baillies’ marriage, the births and upbringing of their children, and the marriages of their daughters. Historians have cited these accounts to demonstrate cost of goods and to provide evidence for the caloric intake of servants during this period.

== Legacy ==
A great deal is known about George and Grizel Baillie's marriage and family thanks to the biography written by their daughter, Grizel Baillie, Lady Murray. Although not intended for publication, the biography appeared in print in 1809 in Observations on the Historical Work of the Right Honorable Charles James Fox under the title "Lady Murray's Narrative". George Baillie's Correspondence (1702-1708) was edited by Lord Minto for the Bannatyne Club in 1842.

Lady Grizel also was memorialized by a Scottish poet who claimed to be a distant relative, Joanna Baillie, in a poem first published in 1821 in Metrical Legends of Exalted Characters.

== See also ==
- Scottish literature
