= Polwarth Castle =

Former Scottish castle

- Polwarth, Scottish Borders, Scotland

Location
- Coordinates: 55.74214°N 2.40127°W

Polwarth Castle was a castle, located near Polwarth, Scottish Borders in Scotland.

== History ==
Held by the Polwarth family it passed by marriage of Elizabeth, the daughter and heiress of Patrick de Polwarth of Polwarth, to John St Clair, 7th Lord Herdmanston. The castle later passed to the Home of Wedderburn family via the heiress Mariota Sinclair and later to the Scott family.

Polwarth was destroyed in the Rough Wooing wars of the 1540s.
