= Alexander Swinton =

Scottish judge

Alexander Swinton, Lord Mersington (1625–1700) was a Scottish judge.

== Biography ==
Swinton, the second son of Sir Alexander Swinton of Swinton, Berwickshire, was born between 1621 and 1630. John Swinton (1621?–1679) was his elder brother. Alexander is first mentioned as fighting in the battle of Worcester on the side of King Charles II of Scotland, where he was taken prisoner. He was admitted advocate on 27 July 1671.

Swinton was a zealous Presbyterian, and his dissatisfaction with the government continued, and he relinquished his profession in 1681 rather than take the Test. He was restored by the king's letter of dispensation on 16 December 1686, and was admitted a Lord Ordinary on 23 June 1688, in place of John Wauchope of Edmonston, taking the title of Lord Mersington, after a place in the parish of Eccles. At the Glorious Revolution which followed immediately, Mersington acted a conspicuous part in the attack on Holyrood House, and, according to a letter "to the late king in France" from Lord Balcarres, who designated Mersington the "fanatique judge", Swinton joined the supporters of William of Orange "with a halbert in his hand, and as drunk as ale or brandy could make him".

Swinton was reappointed a judge in November 1689, he, Sir James Dalrymple of Stair, and Sir John Baird of Newblyth being the only judges who had previously sat on the bench, and Swinton having been the only one of James II's (VII of Scotland) judges who was continued in office by William III. In July 1690 he was appointed a visitor in the act for the visitation of universities, colleges, and schools, and in June 1698 was elected to sit as president until a question as to the nomination of Sir Hew Dalrymple should be confirmed. He continued in office until his death, which took place suddenly in August 1700.(Swinton 1898, p. 236)

== Assessment ==
Sir James Stewart, lord advocate, wrote of him at the time to Carstares, "He was a good man, and is much regretted".

== Family ==
He married, first, a daughter of Sir Alexander Dalmahoy; and, second, Alison Skene, of the family of Hallyards, with whom he had many daughters. His wife is said to have joined a mob of women in petitioning parliament in 1674 against Lauderdale's scheme for new modelling the privy council. At the time it was deemed unsafe for men to avow opposition to the government. In the result the council banished Swinton's wife and those who acted with her from "the town of Edinburgh and the liberties thereof".

His daughter Jane Swinton married John Belsches, nephew of Alexander Belsches, Lord Tofts.
