= Polwarth, Scottish Borders =

Village in Scottish Borders, Scotland

Coordinates: 55.74450°N 2.40775°W

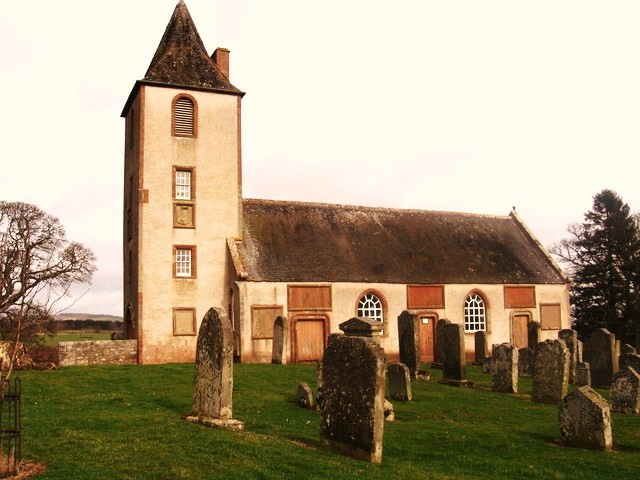
The parish kirk

Polwarth (Scots: Polart) is a village and parish located in the Scottish Borders area of Scotland. It is located at grid reference NT745502, between Greenlaw and Duns, in the former county of Berwickshire.

Nearby places include the Blackadder Water, Fogo, Langston, Longformacus, Marchmont House and Marchmont Estate, all within the Scottish Borders Council Area.

Polwarth Parish Church was built in 1703, replacing a 13th-century building. Polwarth Castle was located halfway between Polwarth village and Polwarth Parish Church.

One notable feature of Polwarth was the Polwarth Thorn, a thorn tree used in village festivities. Several verses and melodies have emerged in connection with it, such as:

- At Polwarth on the green / Our forebears oft are seen / To dance about the thorn / When they got in their corn. - Also: At Polwarth on the Green / If you'll meet me in the morn / Where lads and lasses do convene / To dance around the thorn.

== See also ==
- Merse (Scotland)
- List of places in the Scottish Borders
