= Anne Leslie, Duchess of Rothes =

Scottish aristocrat

Her Grace Anne Leslie, Duchess of Rothes
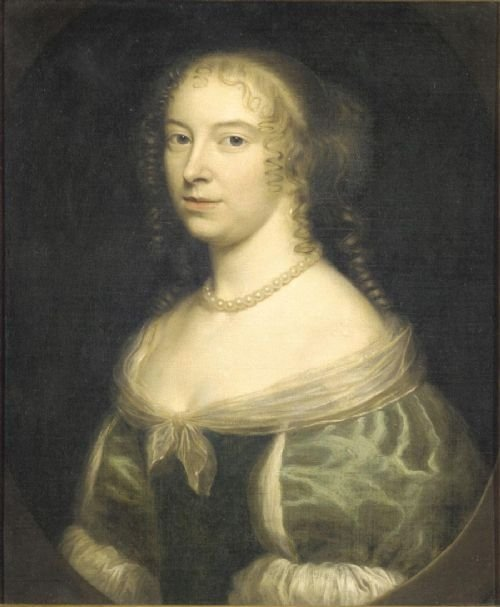
- Portrait of the Duchess of Rothes, by Johannes Mytens, c. 1660
- Born: Lady Anne Lindsay; 1 September 1631
- Died: 1 July 1689 (aged 57)
- Spouse: John Leslie, 1st Duke of Rothes (m. 1647; died 1680)
- Children: Margaret Leslie, 8th Countess of Rothes; Lady Christian Leslie
- Parent(s): John Lindsay, 17th Earl of Crawford; Lady Margaret Hamilton

Anne Leslie, Duchess of Rothes (née Lady Anne Lindsay; 1 September 1631 – 1 July 1689), was a Scottish aristocrat.

== Early life ==
Lady Anne Lindsay was born on 1 September 1631. She was the daughter of John Lindsay, 1st Earl of Lindsay, 17th Earl of Crawford, Lord High Treasurer of Scotland and Lady Margaret Hamilton. Among her siblings were Lady Christian Lindsay (who married the 4th Earl of Haddington), William Lindsay, 18th Earl of Crawford (who married Lady Mary Johnstone, eldest daughter of the 1st Earl of Hartfell), Lady Helen Lindsay (who married Sir Robert Sinclair, Bt), and Lady Elizabeth Lindsay (who married the 3rd Earl of Northesk).

Her paternal grandparents were Robert Lindsay, 9th Lord Lindsay and Lady Christian Hamilton (a daughter of the 1st Earl of Haddington). Her maternal grandparents were James Hamilton, 2nd Marquess of Hamilton and Lady Anne Cunningham (fourth daughter of the 7th Earl of Glencairn).

== Personal life ==
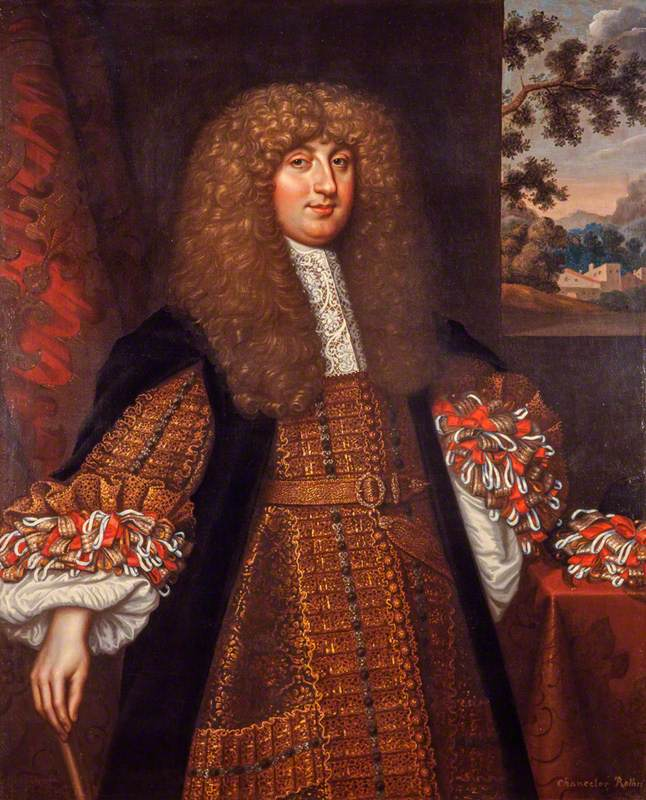
Portrait of her husband, the Duke of Rothes

On 2 February 1647, she married John Leslie, 7th Earl of Rothes (c. 1630–1681), who was later created the 1st Duke of Rothes in 1680. He was the son of John Leslie, 6th Earl of Rothes and Lady Anne Erskine. Together, they had two daughters:

- Margaret Leslie, 8th Countess of Rothes (d. 1700), who married her cousin Charles Hamilton, 5th Earl of Haddington, son of John Hamilton, 4th Earl of Haddington and Lady Christian Lindsay, in 1674.
- Lady Christian Leslie (d. 1710), who married firstly James Graham, 3rd Marquess of Montrose, the son of James Graham, 2nd Marquess of Montrose and Lady Isabel Douglas, in 1681. After his death in 1684, she married Sir John Bruce, 2nd Baronet, son of Sir William Bruce, 1st Baronet and Mary Halkett, in 1687.

Lord Rothes died on 27 July 1681 at Holyrood Palace, Edinburgh. Lady Rothes died on 1 July 1689.

=== Religious beliefs ===
Anne was a devout Presbyterian, and was well known in her day to have had allegiances with the Covenanters. She would regularly attend field preaching meetings, known as conventicles, and on many occasions would invite Covenanters to Leslie House in Leslie as her guests. Her husband, however, believed strongly in restoring the episcopacy. Serving faithfully under Charles II's government, he was naturally opposed to the Covenanters, but for the sake of his wife he generally tolerated them. If he would see any of them at Leslie House, he would remark to Anne, "My lady, I would advise you to keep your chickens in about, else I may pick up some of them." On one occasion, a warrant moved Rothes to conduct a search for any preachers hiding on his estate, and he remarked to his wife, "My hawks will be out tonight, my lady, so you had better take care of your blackbirds!" As a warning, Anne would signal the Covenanters hiding on their estate by placing a white sheet on one of the trees on a hill just behind Leslie House, which could be seen at quite a distance. The Covenanters would also seek the duchess to exert her influence over her husband and the Privy Council, interceding on their behalf in order to lessen the severity of the punishments that would have been carried out by the officials of the day (one of the most notable repressers being Archbishop Sharp, who was a distant kinsman of the duke of Rothes and on occasion was a guest at Leslie House).
