= James Graham, 1st Duke of Montrose =

Scottish politician

His Grace The Duke of Montrose
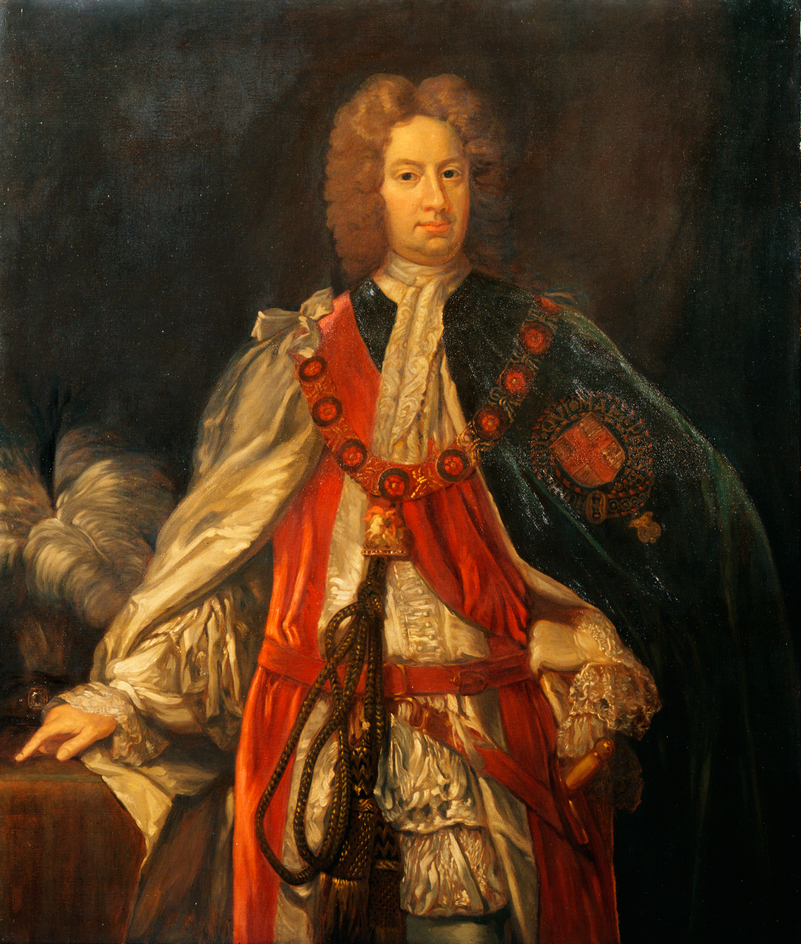
- James Graham, 1st Duke of Montrose

Lord Keeper of the Great Seal of Scotland
- In office 1716–1733
- Monarchs: George I George II
- Preceded by: The Marquess of Annandale
- Succeeded by: The Earl of Ilay

Lord Clerk Register
- In office 1716–1716
- Monarch: George I

Secretary of State for Scotland
- In office 24 September 1714 – August 1715
- Monarch: George I

Keeper of the Privy Seal of Scotland
- In office 1709–1713
- Monarch: Anne

Lord President of the Council of Scotland
- In office 1706–1707
- Monarch: Anne

Lord High Admiral of Scotland
- In office 1705–1706
- Monarch: Anne

Lord President of the Council of Scotland
- In office 1704–1705
- Monarch: Anne

Personal details
- Born: April 1682 Scotland
- Died: 7 January 1742 (aged 59) London, England
- Spouse: Christian Carnegie
- Children: 5, including William and George

James Graham, 1st Duke of Montrose (April 1682 – 7 January 1742) was a Scottish politician.

== Life ==
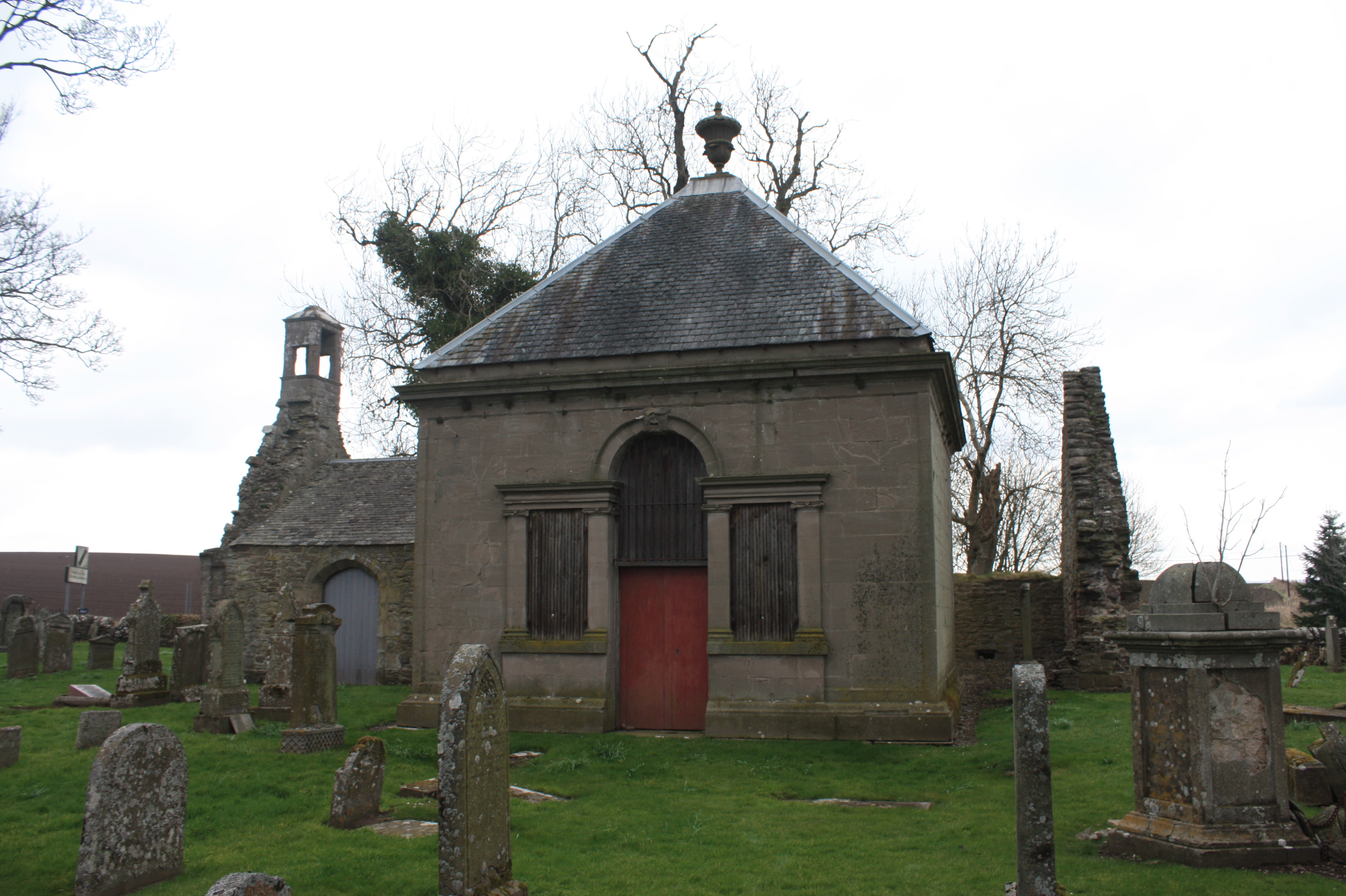
Mausoleum of James Graham, Duke of Montrose, Aberuthven

He was the only son of James Graham, 3rd Marquess of Montrose and Lady Christian Leslie. On 31 March 1702 he married Christian, daughter of David Carnegie, 3rd Earl of Northesk. Together, they had several sons, including William Graham and Lord George Graham.

The fourth Marquess of Montrose, James was elevated to the degree of duke in 1707, as a reward for his important support of the Act of Union, whilst being Lord President of the Scottish Privy Council. He was Lord High Admiral of Scotland from 1705 to 1706. He was Keeper of the Privy Seal of Scotland from 1709 to 1713 and served as Keeper of the Great Seal of Scotland from 1716 to 1733. He was also a Lord of the Regency for Great Britain in 1714, upon the death of Queen Anne, being a firm supporter of the Hanoverian succession and a member of the Whig Hannover Club. Furthermore, he served briefly as Secretary of State for Scotland at the time of the Georgian ministry of Lord Townshend. In 1719, he was one of the main subscribers to the Royal Academy of Music (1719), a corporation that produced baroque opera on the stage. He served as a governor of London's Foundling Hospital at the time of its foundation in 1739. For much of his adult life he was chancellor of the University of Glasgow.

Apart from his political career, he was a primary creditor of Robert Roy MacGregor, who blamed the Duke for his financial ruin. MacGregor then carried out a feud with Graham for some years.

Montrose was responsible for corruption charges, earning himself unpopularity through the famous Jacobite.

His name was listed by Lockhart in 1711 amongst other high profile people who were claimed to have received bribes to support the vote on the Union. The Duke was said to have received £1,000 (approx. £160,000 in 2024 value) as inducement.

On his death Graham was buried at Aberuthven. The grave is within Montrose Mausoleum.

== Issue ==
- James Graham, Lord Graham (7 April 1703 – 2 March 1704)
- David Graham, 1st Earl Graham (8 June 1705 – 30 September 1731)
- Lord Christian Graham (29 Oct 1706–30 May 1711)
- Lady Elizabeth Graham (23 April 1708 – 17 February 1711)
- Lord John Graham (9 April 1709 – 19 March 1710)
- Lord James Graham (26 March 1710 – 3 April 1711)
- Lord Thomas Graham (7 March 1711 – 27 December 1711)
- William Graham, 2nd Duke of Montrose (27 Aug 1712–23 September 1790)
- Lady Margaret Graham (5 June 1714 – 1 April 1729)
- Captain Lord George Graham (26 September 1715 – 2 January 1747)

== In popular culture ==
In Harold French's Rob Roy, the Highland Rogue, Graham is played by Michael Gough.

In Michael Caton-Jones's Rob Roy, Graham is played by John Hurt. In this depiction he is referred to as the "Marquess of Montrose", despite his title being raised to a dukedom in 1707.

== Ancestry ==
Ancestors of James Graham, 1st Duke of Montrose

8. James Graham, 1st Marquess of Montrose
4. James Graham, 2nd Marquess of Montrose
9. Lady Magdalene Carnegie
2. James Graham, 3rd Marquess of Montrose
10. William Douglas, 7th Earl of Morton
5. Lady Isabel Douglas
11. Lady Anne Keith
1. James Graham, 1st Duke of Montrose
12. John Leslie, 6th Earl of Rothes
6. John Leslie, 1st Duke of Rothes
13. Lady Anne Erskine
3. Lady Christian Leslie
14. John Lindsay, 17th Earl of Crawford
7. Lady Anne Lindsay
15. Lady Margaret Hamilton

Political offices
Preceded by The Marquess of Annandale	Lord President of the Council of Scotland; 1704–1705	Succeeded by The Marquess of Annandale
Preceded by The Duke of Richmond and Lennox	Lord High Admiral of Scotland; 1705–1706	Succeeded by The Earl of Wemyss
Preceded by The Marquess of Annandale	Lord President of the Council of Scotland; 1706–1707	Office abolished
Preceded by The Duke of Queensberry and Dover	Keeper of the Privy Seal of Scotland; 1709–1713	Succeeded by The Duke of Atholl
Preceded by The Earl of Mar	Scottish Secretary; 1714–1715	Succeeded by The Duke of Roxburghe
Preceded by The Earl of Ilay	Lord Clerk Register; 1716	Succeeded by Lord Polwarth
Preceded by The Marquess of Annandale	Lord Keeper of the Great Seal of Scotland; 1716–1733	Succeeded by The Earl of Ilay
Academic offices
Preceded by The Earl of Hyndford	Chancellor of the University of Glasgow; 1714–1743	Succeeded by The 2nd Duke of Montrose
Peerage of Scotland
New creation	Duke of Montrose; 1707–1742	Succeeded by William Graham
Preceded by James Graham	Marquess of Montrose; 1684–1742	Succeeded by William Graham
