= John Leslie, 1st Duke of Rothes =

Scottish duke (c. 1630–1681)

His Grace The Duke of Rothes PC
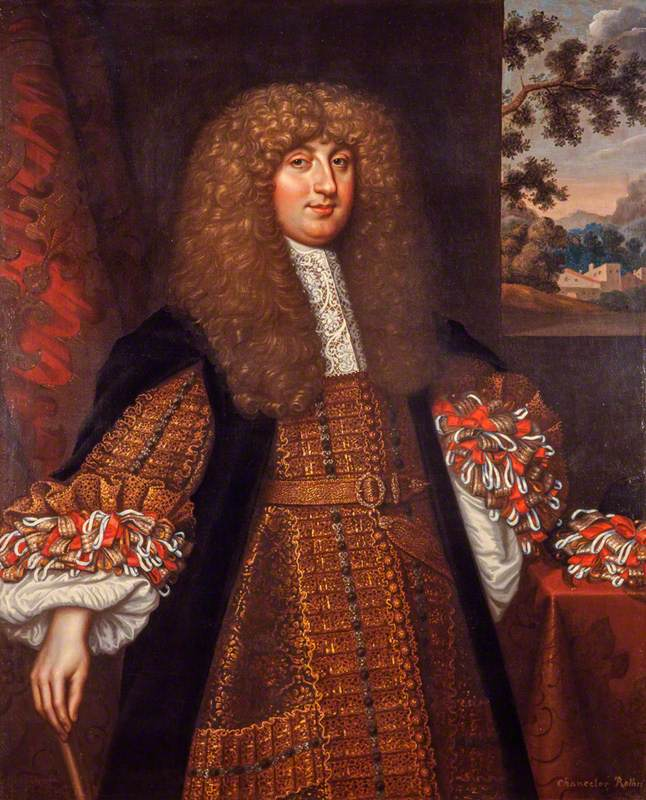

Lord Chancellor of Scotland
- In office 1664–1681
- Preceded by: The Earl of Glencairn
- Succeeded by: The Earl of Aberdeen

Personal details
- Born: John Leslie c. 1630
- Died: 27 July 1681 (aged 50–51) Holyrood Palace, Edinburgh
- Spouse: Lady Anne Lindsay (m. 1647; died 1680)
- Children: Margaret Leslie, 8th Countess of Rothes; Lady Christian Leslie
- Parents: John Leslie, 6th Earl of Rothes (father); Lady Anne Erskine (mother)

John Leslie (c. 1630 – 27 July 1681), son of John Leslie, 6th Earl of Rothes, was the 7th Earl of Rothes and 1st Duke of Rothes. According to tradition, he was a descendant of Princess Beatrix, sister of King Malcolm III of Scotland. His family had intermarried with both the Stuarts and the Bruces.

== Early life ==
Leslie was born in 1630. His mother died when he was ten, and on his father's death in the following year, he succeeded to the peerage. He was placed under the care of John Lindsay, 17th Earl of Crawford, to whose daughter he was betrothed. On account of the wars, his education was much neglected. "He had," wrote Burnet, "no advantage of education, no sort of literature; nor had he travelled abroad; all in him was mere nature".

== Career ==
He was captured at the Battle of Worcester in 1651, his estates were sequestrated by the parliament,and on 18 September he was committed to the Tower of London. On 18 July 1652, his liberty was extended to ten miles from the city of London. On 14 December 1652, he was permitted, on heavy security, to go to Scotland on business for three months; similar permission was granted in 1653 and 1654, and in 1654–1655 he was permitted to stay six months at Newcastle.

On 8 January 1656/57 he obtained leave to visit Scotland again, possibly owing to the influence of Elizabeth Murray, countess of Dysart. However, in January 1658 he was committed to the castle of Edinburgh by Cromwell. This was done in order to prevent a duel between Leslie and Viscount Morpeth, who was jealous of the attentions which Rothes paid his wife; he was released the following December.

Leslie was one of the first noblemen to wait on Charles II on his arrival from Breda in 1660, and on 20 December was appointed colonel of one of the Fife regiments of horse. King Charles II made him the Lord High Treasurer of Scotland, Lord Keeper of the Great Seal of Scotland, Lord Chancellor of Scotland for life in 1667, and President of the Privy Council of Scotland. He carried the sword of state at the coronation of Charles II.

In 1663, when he succeeded his father-in-law as Lord High Treasurer, he was sworn a privy councillor of England, and was appointed Captain of the troop of lifeguards and general of the forces in Scotland. He also received a re-grant in 1663 of the earldom of Rothes, together with the title of Lord Leslie and Ballinbreich.

He was considered over-zealous in his persecution of Covenanters and insufficiently attentive to the defence of Leith against attack by the Dutch. On 16 April 1667 he was deprived of all his offices, but in October was made lord chancellor for life. Through the intervention of the Duke of York, he was on 29 May 1680 created Duke of Rothes, Marquis of Balleobreich, Earl of Leslie, Viscount of Lugton, Lord Auchmutie and Caskiebery.

== Personal life ==
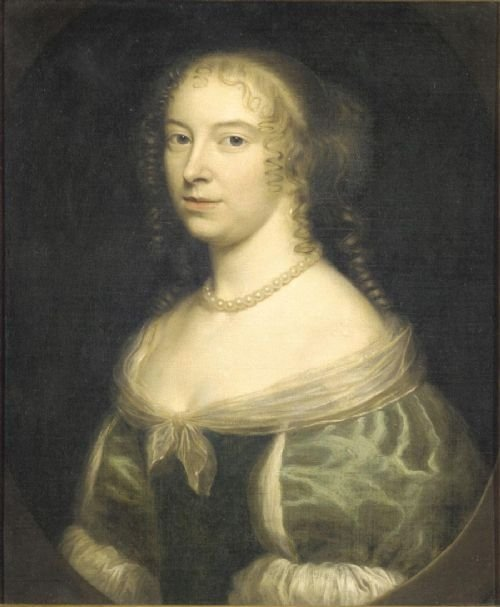
Portrait of the Duchess of Rothes, by Johannes Mytens, c. 1660

On 2 February 1647, he married Anne Crawford-Lindsay, daughter of John Lindsay, 17th Earl of Crawford. He built the Palace of Leslie (also known as Leslie House), which nearly burnt completely in a fire on Christmas Day 1763. Together, they had two daughters:

- Lady Margaret Leslie (d. 1700), who married her cousin Charles Hamilton, 5th Earl of Haddington, son of John Hamilton, 4th Earl of Haddington and Lady Christian Lindsay, in 1674.
- Lady Christian Leslie (1661–1710), who married firstly James Graham, 3rd Marquess of Montrose, the son of James Graham, 2nd Marquess of Montrose and Lady Isabel Douglas, in 1681. After his death in 1684, she married Sir John Bruce, 2nd Baronet, son of Sir William Bruce, 1st Baronet and Mary Halkett, in 1687.

Lord Rothes died at Holyrood Palace in Edinburgh on 27 July 1681. He was awarded a state funeral. The funeral procession was more elaborate and impressive than either Wellington's or Churchill's. It stretched over seventeen miles (27 km) long. The cost of whole regiments of ceremonial guards, soldiers, banners, trumpets, heralds and coaches effectively ruined the family finances forever, and he left behind a huge debt to his daughter, Margaret Leslie. As he had no male issue, the Dukedom of Rothes became extinct, the Earldom only being passed to his daughter.

Parliament of Scotland
Preceded by The Earl of Middleton	Lord High Commissioner; 1663	Succeeded by The Earl of Lauderdale
Political offices
Preceded by The Earl of Glencairn	Lord Chancellor of Scotland; 1664–1681	Succeeded by The Earl of Aberdeen
Peerage of Scotland
New title	Duke of Rothes; 1680–1681	Extinct
Preceded by John Leslie	Earl of Rothes; 1641–1681	Succeeded by Margaret Leslie
