= John Hamilton, Lord Magdalens =

Scottish judge

John Hamilton, Lord Magdalens (1561–1632) was a 16th/17th century Scottish judge and Senator of the College of Justice.

== Life ==
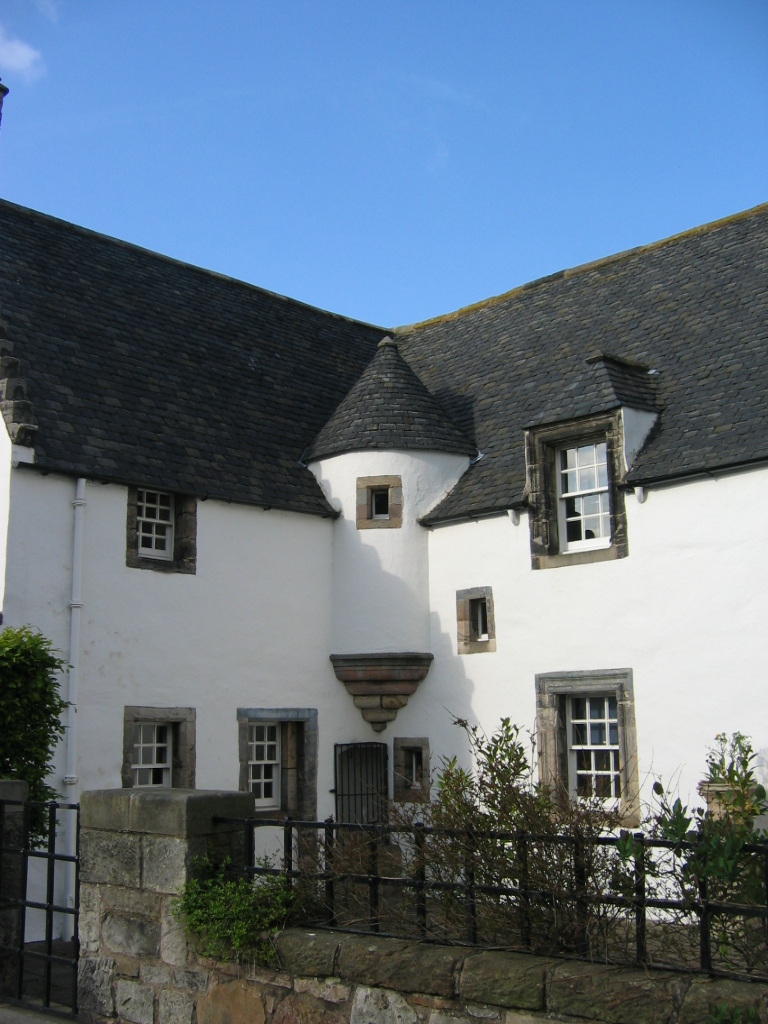
Hamilton House in Preston, East Lothian

He was the son of Thomas Hamilton, Lord Priestfield, 3rd Laird of Priestfield, and his second wife, Elizabeth Murray, daughter of Sir Andrew Murray of Black Barony. His elder brothers included Thomas Hamilton, 1st Earl of Haddington and Andrew Hamilton, Lord Redhouse.

He owned the Magdalens estate, east of Linlithgow. He later also had a house near Prestonpans.

In July 1622 he was created a Senator of the College of Justice: an Ordinary Lord of Session. He was also Lord Clerk Register of Scotland.

In 1626 he built Preston House in Preston village in East Lothian, south of Prestonpans, sometimes then called "Lord Magdalens House". The house is now called the "Hamilton House".

He died at Holyrood House (prior to it becoming a royal palace) on 28 November 1632 and is buried in Holyrood Abbey. His position as Lord Clerk Register was filled by John Hay, Lord Barra.

== Trivia ==
Dying with no sons the Magdalens estate was sold to the Dundas family. The estate is now home to the St Magdalene distillery.

His house in East Lothian was taken over by the National Trust for Scotland in 1937.

== Family ==
In 1602 he married his cousin, Agnes Hamilton. They had two daughters: Anna and Elizabeth.
