= Thomas Hamilton, 2nd Earl of Haddington =

Scottish nobleman (1600–1640)

The Right Honourable The Earl of Haddington PC
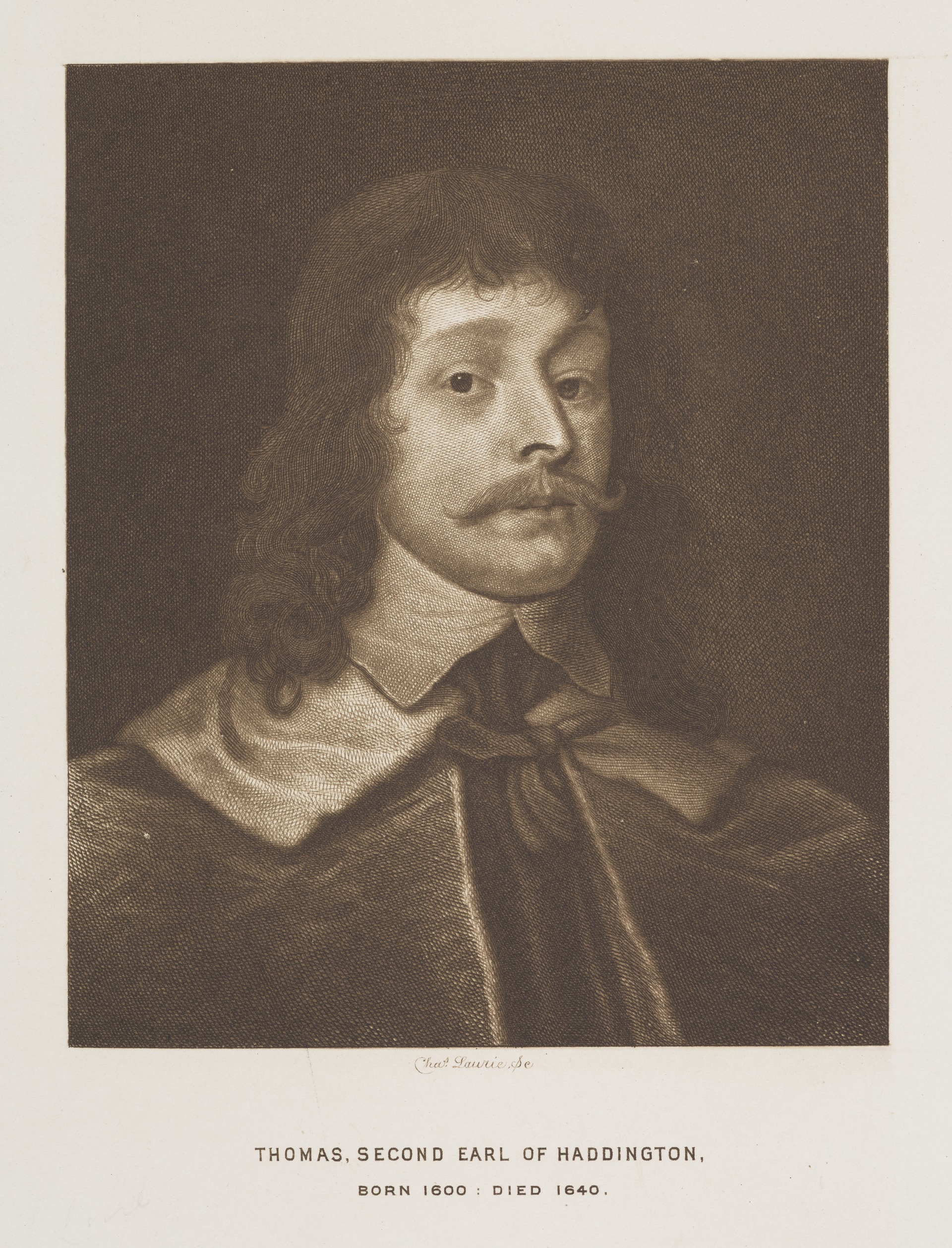
- Portrait of Lord Haddington by Charles Laurie

Personal details
- Born: Thomas Hamilton; 25 May 1600
- Died: 30 August 1640 (aged 40) Dunglass Castle, East Lothian
- Spouses: Lady Catherine Erskine (died 1635) Lady Jean Gordon (m. 1640)
- Children: Thomas Hamilton, 3rd Earl of Haddington; John Hamilton, 4th Earl of Haddington; Margaret Keith, Countess of Kintore
- Parent(s): Thomas Hamilton, 1st Earl of Haddington; Margaret Foulis

Military service
- Rank: Major General

Thomas Hamilton, 2nd Earl of Haddington (25 May 1600 – 30 August 1640) was a Scottish nobleman.

== Early life ==
Thomas Hamilton, Lord Binning was the eldest son of Thomas Hamilton, 1st Earl of Haddington and his second wife, Margaret Foulis of Colinton. Until his accession to his father's Earldom, he was known by the courtesy title Lord Binning.

== Career ==
Following education abroad Binning returned to Scotland where he attended Parliament in 1621. Binning attended his father at the funeral of King James in London, and later was a canopy bearer during Charles I's 1633 coronation in Edinburgh at Holyrood Abbey.

Binning succeeded to his father's titles in 1637, and the following year, at the King's urging, signed the National Covenant. At the start of the Bishops' War, Haddington was commissioned Major General for the Lothians, under General Leslie. When General Leslie advanced into England in 1640, he left armaments behind at Duns, Haddington retrieved them and brought them back to his headquarters at Dunglass Castle, to prevent their capture by the English garrison at Berwick upon Tweed. On 29 August, he beat back an attempt of the garrison of Berwick to capture a magazine of victuals and arms near Coldstream.

On 30 August 1640, a huge explosion took place in the powder magazine of Dunglass Castle, destroying it. Haddington, who was standing in the courtyard reading correspondence from Leslie to his kinsfolk and men, was killed. Others killed were Haddington's brother, Robert Hamilton of Wester Binning; his natural brother, Patrick Hamilton; his cousins John Hamilton of Redhouse and Alexander Hamilton of Innerwick; Alexander's son, Haddington's brother-in-law, Colonel Sir John Erskine; and the Minister of Bonkyl Kirk, Master John Gaittis.

== Personal life ==
Haddington married Lady Catherine Erskine (d. 1635), daughter of John Erskine, Earl of Mar and Lady Mary Stuart, herself a daughter of Esmé Stewart, 1st Duke of Lennox, and by her had issue:

- Thomas Hamilton, 3rd Earl of Haddington (1626–1645), who married Henriette de Coligny, a daughter of Gaspard de Coligny, Duc de Châtillon in 1643.
- John Hamilton, 4th Earl of Haddington (1626–1669), who married Lady Christian Lindsay, a daughter of John Lindsay, 17th Earl of Crawford, in 1648.
- Hon. Robert Hamilton, who died in infancy.
- Hon. James Hamilton, who died in infancy.
- Lady Margaret Hamilton, who died in infancy.

Following his Countess's death in 1635, Haddington married Lady Jean Gordon in 1640. Lady Jean, a daughter of George Gordon, 2nd Marquess of Huntly and Lady Anne Campbell (a daughter of Archibald Campbell, 7th Earl of Argyll), had a posthumous daughter with Lord Haddington:

- Lady Margaret Hamilton (b. 1641), married John Keith, 1st Earl of Kintore.

Following Lord Haddington's death in 1640, he was succeeded in his titles by his eldest son, Thomas.

Peerage of Scotland
Preceded by Thomas Hamilton	Earl of Haddington; 1637–1640	Succeeded by Thomas Hamilton
