= Thomas Hamilton, Lord Priestfield =

Scottish judge

Thomas Hamilton, Lord Priestfield (c.1535–1611) was a 16th/17th century Scottish judge and Senator of the College of Justice.

== Life ==
He was born at Priestfield House south of Edinburgh, the eldest son of Thomas Hamilton, 2nd Laird of Priestfield, and Elizabeth Leslie of Innerpeffer. He was descended from the Hamiltons of Innerwick. His father was killed at the Battle of Pinkie Cleugh near Inveresk in 1547.

He trained as a lawyer and was a judge in Edinburgh, living in Priestfield House south of the city, which he renamed Prestonfield House, about the time of his May 1607 election as a Senator of the College of Justice.

Lord Prestonfield died in Dunlop, East Ayrshire in 1611.

== Family ==
Thomas Hamilton married twice.

In 1558 he married three-times-married Elizabeth Heriot, a daughter of James Heriot of Trabroun. Their children included:

- Thomas Hamilton, 1st Earl of Haddington
- Christian Hamilton, who married Alexander Hamilton of Innerwick

In 1572 he married Elizabeth Murray, daughter of Sir Andrew Murray of Black Barony. Their children included:

- John Hamilton, Lord Magdalens, also a Senator of the College of Justice, who built Preston House in Prestonpans.
- Andrew Hamilton, Lord Redhouse, who married Jonet Laing, heiress of Redhouse Castle.
- Patrick Stewart of Little Preston, who married Elizabeth Macmorran, daughter of Ninian Macmorran, of Edinburgh
- General Alexander Hamilton (d.1649).

His brother John Hamilton died in the Tower of London in 1610.
