= Thomas Hamilton, 3rd Earl of Haddington =

Scottish nobleman

The Right Honourable The Earl of Haddington
- Coat of arms of the Earls of Haddington before 1858.
- Born: Thomas Hamilton; 1626
- Died: 8 February 1645 (aged 18–19)
- Spouse: Henriette de Coligny (m. 1643; died 1645)
- Parent(s): Thomas Hamilton, 2nd Earl of Haddington; Lady Catherine Erskine
- Relatives: John Hamilton, 4th Earl of Haddington (brother)

Thomas Hamilton, 3rd Earl of Haddington (1626 – 8 February 1645) was a short-lived Scottish nobleman.

== Early life ==
Haddington was born in 1626, eldest son of Thomas Hamilton, 2nd Earl of Haddington and Lady Catherine Erskine. His younger brother, John Hamilton, married Lady Christian Lindsay (a daughter of the 17th Earl of Crawford). Following his mother's death in 1635, in 1640 his father married Lady Jean Gordon (a daughter of the 2nd Marquess of Huntly). From this marriage, he had a younger half-sister, Lady Margaret Hamilton (who married John Keith, 1st Earl of Kintore).

His paternal grandparents were Thomas Hamilton, 1st Earl of Haddington and the former Margaret Foulis of Colinton. His maternal grandparents were John Erskine, Earl of Mar and Lady Marie Stewart (daughter of Esmé Stewart, 1st Duke of Lennox who was a favourite of James VI of Scotland).

Lord Haddington was a minor when he succeeded his father. The latter having been killed in an explosion at Dunglass Castle during the Bishops' Wars. Haddington travelled to the continent to further his education.

== Personal life ==
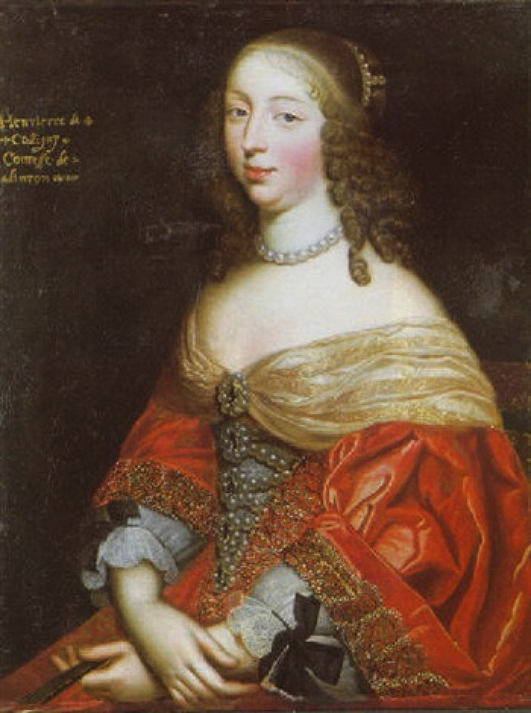
Portrait of his wife, Henriette de Coligny, by the studio of Frères Beaubrun

While in France he met Henriette de Coligny, daughter to Gaspard de Coligny, Duc de Châtillon, Marshal of France. Henriette was eight years senior to Haddington, but nevertheless a marriage was contracted between them in 1643.

Haddington and his bride returned to Scotland, where he involved himself with the Covenanters. Haddington died, while still underage, of consumption on 8 February 1645, without issue. His countess returned to France where she remarried to Gaspard de Champagne, Comte de la Suze, and died in 1673.

Lord Haddington was succeeded by his brother John Hamilton, 4th Earl of Haddington.

Peerage of Scotland
Preceded by Thomas Hamilton	Earl of Haddington; 1640–1645	Succeeded by John Hamilton
