= John Hamilton-Leslie, 9th Earl of Rothes =

Scottish Earl

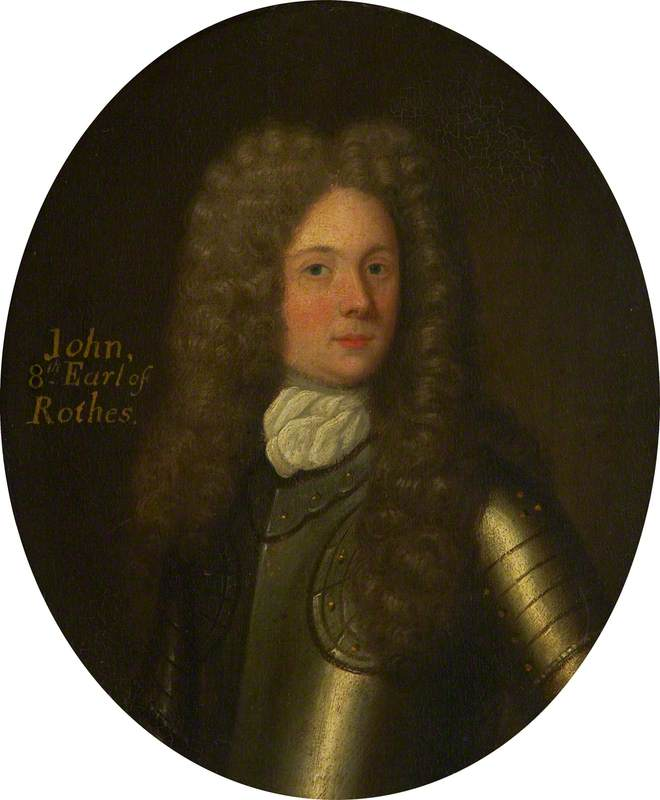
Portrait of John Leslie, Earl of Rothes

John Hamilton-Leslie, 9th Earl of Rothes (1679–1722), was a Scottish nobleman who fought on the side of George I during the Jacobite rising of 1715.

== Biography ==
John Hamilton-Leslie, born in 1679, was the eldest son of Charles Hamilton, 5th Earl of Haddington, and Margaret Leslie, 8th Countess of Rothes. In 1701, Hamilton-Leslie succeeded his mother as Earl of Rothes, the chief of Clan Leslie. His younger brother became Thomas Hamilton, 6th Earl of Haddington.

On 29 April 1697, Hamilton-Leslie married Lady Jean Hay, the daughter of John Hay, 2nd Marquess of Tweeddale. The couple had eight sons and four daughters.

In 1704, Hamilton-Leslie was appointed Keeper of the Privy Seal of Scotland. In 1707, after the passage of the Acts of Union by the English and Scottish Parliaments, Hamilton-Leslie was appointed as one of the 16 Scottish representative peers to sit in the English House of Lords. He served as representative peer until 1722. In 1714, George I appointed Hamilton-Leslie as vice admiral of Scotland.

In the Jacobite rising of 1715, Hamilton-Leslie fought for George I in Scotland against the pretender James Francis Edward Stuart. In a skirmish at Kinross, Hamilton-Leslie led a troop of the Scots Greys that defeated the Jacobites and took Sir Thomas Bruce captive. At the Battle of Sheriffmuir, he led a group of volunteer fighters. Hamilton-Leslie raised a militia group in Fife that he led against the forces of Rob Roy MacGregor in Falkland, Fife. Hamilton-Leslie turned his own house into a garrison.

In 1716, after the defeat of the Jacobites, George I appointed Hamilton-Leslie as governor of Stirling Castle to compensate him for his property losses during the insurgency. Hamilton-Leslie held this command until 1722. He was also named chamberlain of Fife and Strathearn.

John Hamilton-Leslie died on 9 May 1722 at Leslie House.

Military offices
Preceded by David Wemyss	Vice Admiral of Scotland; 1714–1722	Succeeded by Charles Douglas
Peerage of Scotland
Preceded by Margaret Leslie	Earl of Rothes; 1700–1722	Succeeded by John Leslie
