= Margaret Leslie, 8th Countess of Rothes =

Scottish noble

Margaret Leslie
- 8th Countess of Rothes (8th ruler)
- Reign: 27 July 1681 – 20 August 1700
- Predecessor: John Leslie, 7th Earl and 1st Duke of Rothes
- Successor: John Hamilton-Leslie, 8th/9th Earl
- Spouse(s): Charles Hamilton, 5th Earl of Haddington
- Issue: John Hamilton-Leslie, 9th Earl of Rothes; Thomas Hamilton, 6th Earl of Haddington; Charles Hamilton; Lady Anna Hamilton
- Father: John Leslie, 1st Duke of Rothes
- Mother: Anne Crawford-Lindsay

Margaret Leslie was born sometime before 1660. She was the daughter of the previous earl (and also Duke) of Rothes, John Leslie, who was the 7th Earl and 1st Duke of Rothes. On 8 October 1674, she married her cousin Charles Hamilton, 5th Earl of Haddington, making her children thus Hamilton's. Under the terms of her father's earldom, Hamilton took the surname of Leslie, and arranged to pass his own peerage to the second son.

She had four children, the eldest of whom was John Hamilton-Leslie who became Earl after her death in August 1700. One of her other children would become the 6th Earl of Haddington.

== Marriage and children ==
On 8 October 1674 she married her cousin Charles Hamilton, 5th Earl of Haddington.

Their children were:

1. Hon John Hamilton, later Leslie, later 9th Earl of Rothes
2. Hon Thomas Hamilton, later 6th Earl of Haddington
3. Charles Hamilton (dvm. young)
4. Lady Anna Hamilton (bapt. 25 Aug 1676)

Peerage of Scotland
Preceded by John Leslie	Countess of Rothes; 1681–1700	Succeeded by John Hamilton-Leslie
