= Spittal, East Lothian =

Coordinates: 55.985°N 2.857°W

Spittal: Scottish Gaelic: An Spideal
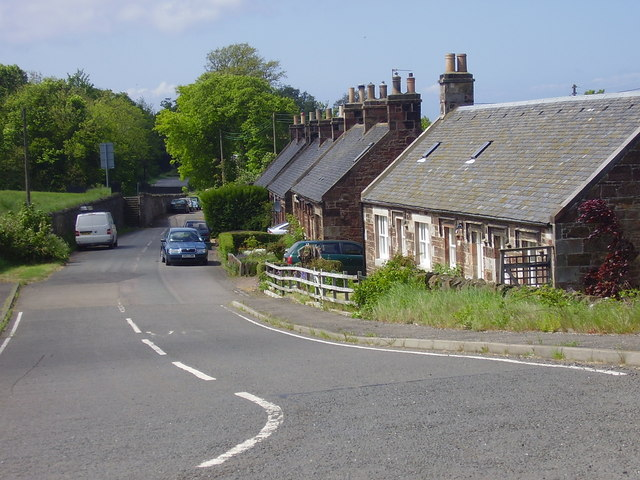
- Farm Cottages at Spittal

- Location within Scotland
- OS grid reference: NT465771
- Civil parish: Aberlady
- Council area: East Lothian Council
- Lieutenancy area: East Lothian
- Country: Scotland
- Sovereign state: United Kingdom
- Post town: LONGNIDDRY
- Postcode district: EH32
- Dialling code: 01875
- Police: Scotland
- Fire: Scottish
- Ambulance: Scottish
- UK Parliament: East Lothian
- Scottish Parliament: East Lothian

Spittal is a hamlet or small village in East Lothian, Scotland, UK, on the B1377, east of Longniddry, south-south-west of Aberlady and to the west of Garleton and north of Gladsmuir. It is close to both Redhouse Castle, Gosford House and Spittal House.

The placename "Spittal" suggests a religious community running a pilgrim's hostel or hospice.

== See also ==
- List of places in East Lothian
