= Nicholas Otterbourne =

Nicholas Otterbourne or Otterburn (c.1400–1462) was a Scottish churchman and official, clerk register of Scotland and a diplomat.

== Life ==
Otterbourne is mentioned on 9 January 1450 as Master of Arts, canon of Glasgow Cathedral, and official of Lothian; on 20 March 1450 as secretary to James II of Scotland, and in 1454 as clerk of the rolls. He was one of those who had been sent in February 1448 to France on a confidential mission in connection with the king's marriage. On 3 November 1450 he had a warrant of safe-conduct for three months to pass into France; on 3 June 1455 a warrant from the king of England for a safe-conduct to England for four months; and on 11 May 1456 a warrant for three months. On 13 July 1459 he had a safe-conduct, with others, into England to confer with English commissioners at Newcastle upon Tyne.

== Works ==
He is stated to have been the author of Epithalamium Jacobi II, Lib. 1.

== Notes ==
Attribution

This article incorporates text from a publication now in the public domain: Lee, Sidney, ed. (1895). "Otterbourne, Nicholas". Dictionary of National Biography. Vol. 42. London: Smith, Elder & Co.
