= Andrew Hamilton, Lord Redhouse =

Scottish landowner (1565–1634)

Andrew Hamilton, Lord Redhouse (c. 1565 – September 1634) was a Scottish landowner and Senator of the College of Justice.

== Life ==
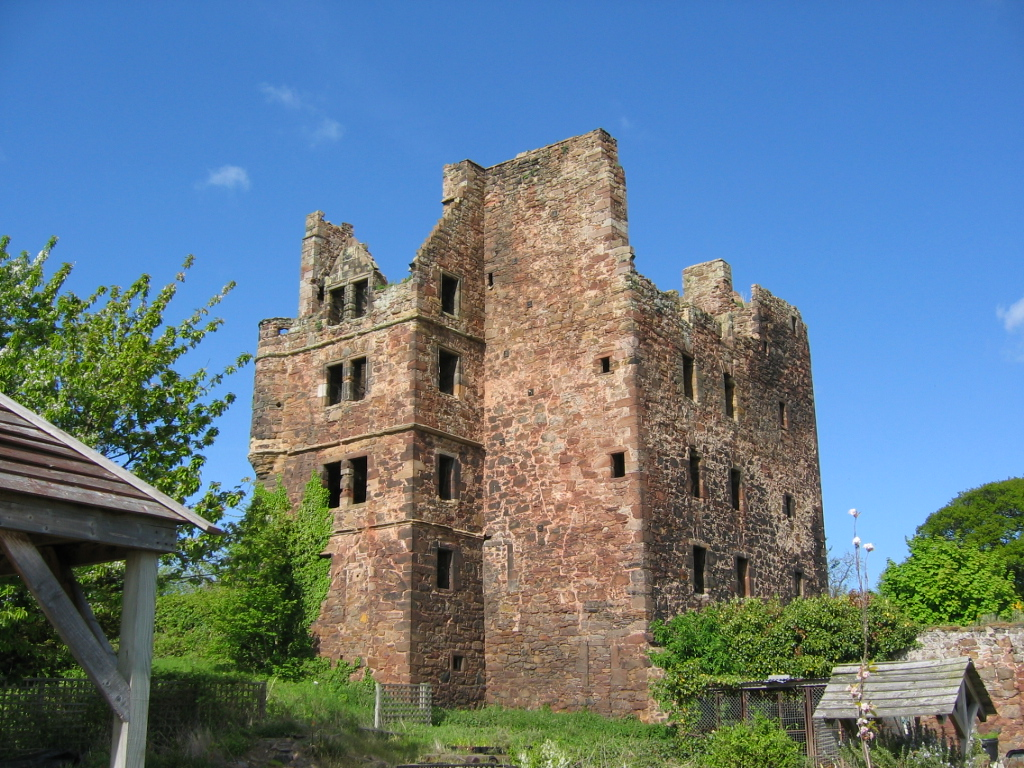
Redhouse Castle

He was the son of Thomas Hamilton, Lord Priestfield, and was probably born at Priestfield House in East Lothian. His mother was Robert's first wife, Elizabeth Heriot. His elder brother was Thomas Hamilton, 1st Earl of Haddington. His younger brother was John Hamilton, Lord Magdalens.

He owned the estate of Spittal in East Lothian. In June 1608 he was elected a Senator of the College of Justice and assumed the title of Lord Redhouse. This title linked to his recent marriage, but was slightly presumptuous as he did not inherit Redhouse Castle until the death of his father-in-law in 1617.

He died in September 1634. His place as a Senator (Lord of Session) was filled by William Elphinstone, Lord Elphinstone.

Redhouse Castle survives as a ruin near Longniddry.

== Family ==
In 1608 he was married to Jean Laing, daughter of John Laing of Redhouse. They had a daughter, Anne Hamilton, and several sons: John (d.1662, the eldest and heir), Andrew, and Patrick. John inherited the estate of Redhouse in October 1634 and married Helen Richardson, daughter of Sir Robert Richardson, Baronet of Pencaitland.
