= Lord Clerk Register =

Scottish Great Officer of State

- The Royal Coat of Arms as used in Scotland

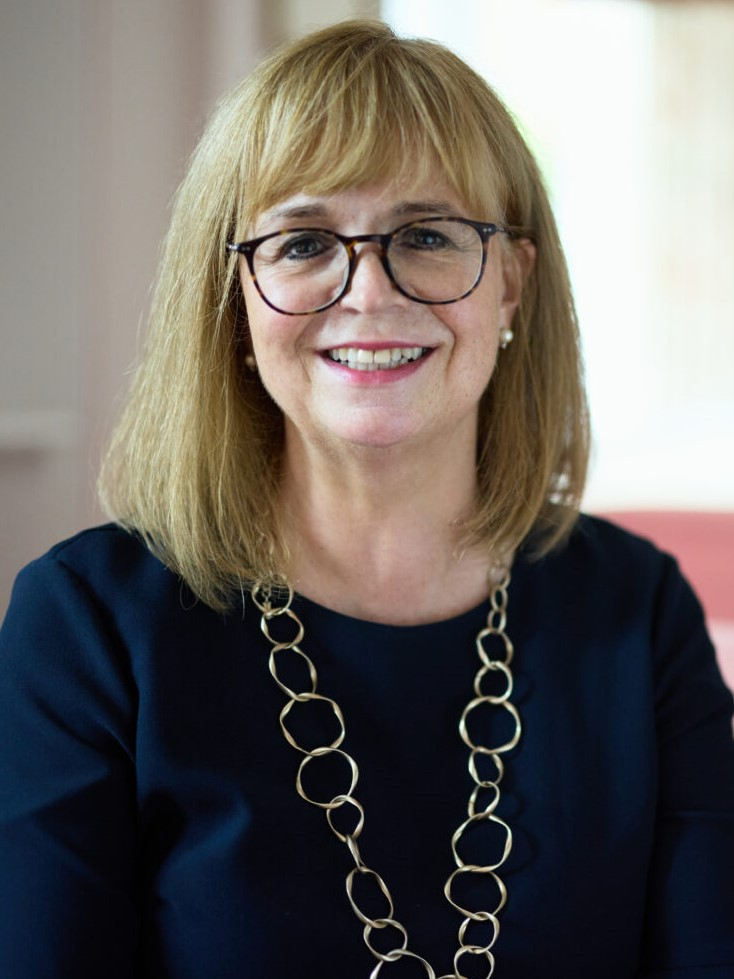
- Incumbent; Lady Elish Angiolini since 5 June 2023
- Department of the Registers of Scotland; Scottish Courts and Tribunal Service
- Member of: Society of Writers to His Majesty's Signet
- Nominator: The First Minister
- Appointer: Monarch, on the recommendation by the First Minister
- Formation: 1288, as Clerk of the Rolls of the Kings Chapel
- First holder: William, Bishop of St Andrews
- Website: Scottish Courts and Tribunal Service

The office of Lord Clerk Register (Scottish Gaelic: Clàr Morair Clèireach) is the oldest remaining Great Officer of State in Scotland, with origins in the 13th century. It historically had important functions in relation to the maintenance and care of the public records of Scotland. Today these duties are administered by the Keeper of the National Records of Scotland and the Keeper of the Registers of Scotland.

When established originally in the 13th century, the office of Lord Clerk Register was mostly a clerical office role, but by the 15th century, the Clerk Register had become an officer of state with a seat in the Parliament of Scotland.

In their capacity as Keeper of the Signet, the Lord Clerk Register executes ceremonial functions as the senior officer of the Society of Writers to His Majesty's Signet. Writers to the Signet historically had various privileges relating to the drawing up of documents which required to be signeted. These privileges have since become defunct, and the society is now an independent, non-regulatory association of solicitors who are mostly based in Edinburgh, Scotland's capital city.

== History of Office ==
=== Kingdom of Scotland ===
The first usage of the office appears in 1288, as Clerk of the Rolls of the Kings Chapel. In 1291 it was termed "Keeper of the Rolls of the Kingdom of Scotland" After the Wars of Independence, a similar office appeared with the title of "Clerk of the Rolls", which was altered about 1373 to "Clerk of the Rolls and Register", the "register" being the record of charters (i.e.: grants of land or titles of nobility) made under the Great Seal.

While the Clerk of Rolls and Register was originally responsible for the records of Chancery, Parliament and Exchequer, but as the central civil court developed out of the king's council in the fifteenth century, he became responsible for its records too, and from 1483 he was "Clerk of the Rolls, Register and Council"^{5}. This court later became the Court of Session.

By the fifteenth century, the Clerk Register ranked as an officer of state with a seat in Parliament and the council. By the sixteenth and seventeenth centuries, more honorific styles such as "Lord Register" or "Lord Clerk Register" came to be adopted when describing the Clerk of Rolls. The Clerk Register remained responsible for the records of Parliament and its committees and commissions, the Exchequer, and the Court of Session (representing the judicial side of the old council). From the later sixteenth century statutory additions were made to his functions as new legal registers were put under his control, the most important being the Register of Sasines in 1617 with the passage of the Registration Act 1617.

By the time of the Union with the Kingdom of England in 1707, the office was known as the "Clerk of the Registers and Rolls of the council, Session and Exchequer, and of all Commissions, Parliaments and Conventions of Estates". Since 1488 appointments to the office have been made by the Sovereign by commission under the Great Seal.

=== Treaty of Union (1707) and preservation ===
The Treaty of Union in 1707 provided for the preservation of public records; and the office was also entrusted the election and management of the sixteen Scottish peers to the House of Lords in the new British parliament, with two Clerks of Session commissioned by him to assist. However without the sitting of a Scottish Parliament or Scottish Privy Council, the Lord Clerk Register's duties fell greatly, remaining only entrusted with the court and other legal records.

=== Ceremonial Great Officer of State ===
In 1806, a Royal Warrant established the office of Deputy Clerk Register, effectively reducing the duties of the Lord Clerk Registers to an honorary title. In 1817, the Public Offices (Scotland) Act 1817 (c 64) incorporated the offices of Lord Clerk Register with HM Keeper of the Signet. In 1818, a Royal Commission entrusted the officers of state, including the Lord Clerk Register for the time being, with the custody of the Honours of Scotland.

In 1854, the Deputy Clerk Register's duties were also extended to the care of the records of births, deaths and marriages under the Registration of Births, Deaths and Marriages (Scotland) Act 1854, which established the General Registry Office of Births, Deaths and Marriages.

The Lord Clerk Register (Scotland) Act 1879 provided that the office of Lord Clerk Register would remain as a ceremonial Great Officer of State, with all duties passing to the Deputy Clerk Register. However, the Lord Clerk Register did retain an important function, namely responsibility for organising the election of Scottish representative peers to the House of Lords, until the passage of the Peerage Act 1963 gave all Scottish peers the right to sit in the Lords.

In 1928, the office of Deputy Clerk Register was abolished by the Reorganisation of Offices (Scotland) Act 1928, becoming the Keeper of the Registers and Records of Scotland. However, it came to be recognised that the keeping of records and the keeping of registers was too cumbersome a task to be entrusted to a single official.

In 1948, the Public Registers and Records (Scotland) Act 1948 provided that the Registers of Scotland and Records of Scotland were to be split into two separate government organisations with two separate officials: (1) the Keeper of the Registers of Scotland and (2) the Keeper of the Records of Scotland. These individuals now run (1) the Registers of Scotland and (2) the National Records of Scotland.

=== Present ===
In 1996, the Commissioners of the Regalia were given additional responsibility for the Stone of Destiny, or the Stone of Scone, under another Royal Warrant, when the Stone was moved to Edinburgh.

Prior to devolution, the Lord Clerk Register was appointed by the Monarch on the advice of a Minister of the Crown. On the creation of the Scottish Parliament and Scottish Executive in 1999, the Prime Minister announced that the function of advising the Monarch on the making of certain appointments and the use of the Royal prerogative would be transferred to the First Minister. Those functions included advice on appointment of the Lord Clerk Register.

The Scottish Executive announced on 27 April 2007 that Elizabeth II had appointed Lord Mackay of Clashfern to the office of Lord Clerk Register, replacing David Charteris, 12th Earl of Wemyss. The Lord Clerk Register remains a Commissioner for the Regalia and the Keeper of the Signet by virtue of the 1879 Act. As such the office is largely ceremonial. The Lord Clerk Register ranks in the order of precedence in Scotland after the First Minister (as Keeper of the Great Seal) and the Lord Justice General, and before the Lord Advocate and Lord Justice Clerk.

== Office holders ==
incomplete list

- William, Bishop of St Andrews
- Simon de Quincy
- Nicolas, Clericus to Malcolm IV
- William de Bosch, Hugo, Galfrid, and Gregory, all served Alexander II
- 1253: William Capellanus and Alexander de Carrick
- 1323: Robert de Dunbar
- John Gray, appointed by Robert II
- 1426: John Schives, decretorum director
- 1440: Richard Craig, Vicar of Dundee
- 1442: George Shoriswood, Rector of Culter
- 1449: Sir John Methven
- 1450: John Arouse, Archdeacon of Glasgow
- 1455: Nicol Otterburn
- 1466: Fergus McDowall
- 1471: David Guthrie of that Ilk
- 1473: John Layng, Rector of Newlands, Glasgow
- 1477: Alexander Inglis, afterwards Deacon of Dunkeld
- 1482: Patrick Leith, Canon of Glasgow
- 1482: Alexander Scot, Rector of Wigton
- 1488: William Hepburn, Vicar of Linlithgow
- 1489: Richard Murehead, Deacon of Glasgow
- 1492: John Fraser, Rector of Restalrig
- 1497: Walter Drummond, Deacon of Dunblane
- 1500: Gavin Dunbar, Archdeacon of St Andrews, afterwards Bishop of Aberdeen
- Sir Stephen Lockhart, appointed by James IV
- 1531: Sir James Foulis of Colinton
- 1548: Sir Thomas Marjoribanks of Ratho
- 1554: James MacGill of Nether Rankeillour, Parson of Flisk
- 1565: James Balfour of Pittendreich
- 1567: James MacGill of Nether Rankeillour
- 1577: Alexander Hay of Easter Kennet (d 1594)
- 1594-1612: Sir John Skene of Curriehill
- 1598: James Skeen, conjunct with his father
- 1612: Sir Thomas Hamilton, afterwards 1st Earl of Haddington
- 1612: Sir Alexander Hay, Lord Newton of Whitburgh, Lord Newton
- 1616: Sir George Hay of Netherleiffe
- 1622: Sir John Hamilton of Magdalens, brother to the Earl of Haddington
- 1632: Sir John Hay, Lord Barra
- 1641: Sir Alexander Gibson, Lord Durie, younger of Durie
- 1649: Archibald Johnston, Lord Warriston
- 1660: Archibald Primrose, Lord Carrington, of Chester
- 1676: Sir Thomas Murray of Glendoick
- 1681: Sir George Mackenzie, 2nd Baronet
- c1690: Sir Thomas Burnett, 3rd Baronet of Leys
- 1692-1695: George Mackenzie, 1st Earl of Cromartie
- 1696-1702: Charles Douglas, 2nd Earl of Selkirk
- November 1702 - June 1704: Sir James Murray, Lord Philiphaugh
- 1704-1705: James Johnston
- April 1705 - July 1708: James Murray, Lord Philiphaugh
- 1708-14: David Boyle, 1st Earl of Glasgow
- 1714: Archibald Campbell, 3rd Duke of Argyll
- 1716: James Graham, 1st Duke of Montrose
- 1716: Alexander Hume-Campbell, 2nd Earl of Marchmont, 2nd Lord Polwarth
- 1733: Charles Douglas, 2nd Earl of Selkirk
- 1739: William Kerr, 3rd Marquess of Lothian
- 1756: Alexander Hume Campbell
- 1760: James Douglas, 14th Earl of Morton
- 1761 Sir Gilbert Elliot, 2nd Baronet, of Minto
- 1768: Lord Frederick Campbell
- 1816: Archibald Campbell Colquhoun
- 1821: William Dundas
- 1841: James Andrew Broun-Ramsay, 1st Marquess of Dalhousie
- 1862: Sir William Gibson Craig of Riccarton
- 1879: George Frederick Boyle, 6th Earl of Glasgow
- 1890: Douglas Beresford Malise Ronald Graham, 5th Duke of Montrose
- 1926: John Charles Montagu-Douglas-Scott, 7th Duke of Buccleuch, 9th Duke of Queensberry
- 1935: Walter John Francis Erskine, 12th Earl of Mar, 14th Earl of Kellie
- 1944: Sidney Herbert Elphinstone, 16th Baron Elphinstone
- 1956: Walter John Montagu-Douglas-Scott, 8th Duke of Buccleuch, 10th Duke of Queensberry
- 1974: Francis David Charteris, 12th Earl of Wemyss, 8th Earl of March
- 2007: James Mackay, Baron Mackay of Clashfern
- 2023: Lady Elish Angiolini

== See also ==
- Registrar General for Scotland
- Lord Justice Clerk
