= Redhouse Castle =

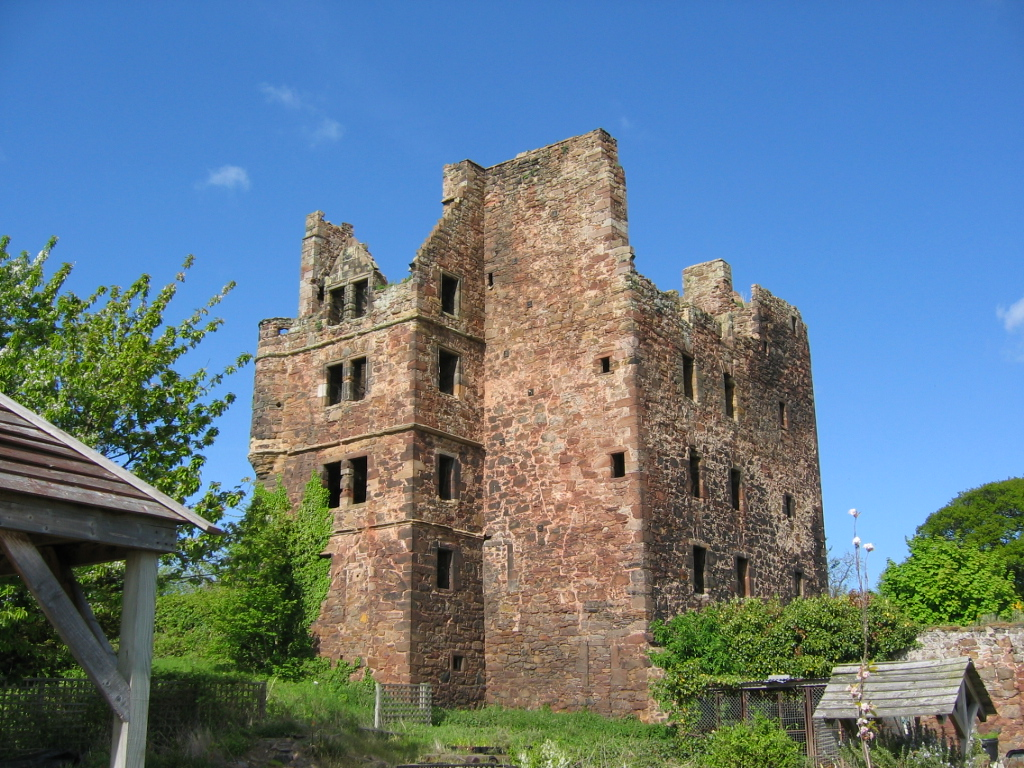
- Redhouse Castle

- Location in East Lothian
- 55.983611°N 2.862778°W

Scheduled monument
- Designated: 20 November 1969
- Reference no.: SM775

Redhouse Castle is a ruined tower house castle, 2 km east of Longniddry, East Lothian, Scotland, UK, on the B1377, close to Spittal. The castle designated as a scheduled monument. It is no longer protected as a category A listed building.

== History ==
The first version of the castle appears to have been a religious institution, probably a hospice for pilgrims and travellers, belonging to the Douglas family. In April 1421 the Earl of Douglas transferred the estates of Ballencrieff and Gosford to his mistress Christian de Ramsay to provide for her and their children.

The castle, a four-storey manor house in red sandstone, remained in the hands of the Douglas family, but it was sold in 1607 to John Layng, the Keeper of the Signet. His initials and those of his wife Rebecca Dennistoun are carved into the pediment. He died in 1612 and is buried in the churchyard of Greyfriars Kirk, Edinburgh.

In 1608 Layng's daughter Jeane married Sir Andrew Hamilton [of the Hamiltons of Haddington family]. Shortly afterwards Sir Andrew applied to the Scottish Parliament for the title Lord Redhouse, and when John Layng died Sir Andrew became the owner of Redhouse Castle. Some years later Sir John Hamilton extended the keep into an L-plan, with a lectern-style doocot built into the gateway.

After the 1745 Jacobite rising, the Hamiltons forfeited the castle when Colonel George Hamilton, the last owner, was hanged, drawn and quartered for high treason at Carlisle Castle. It remained empty for some time until, in 1755, it was bought by Lord Elibank in 1755 who preferred to live in his townhouse in the High Street in Edinburgh. The market garden was (and is) a going concern, but he was unable to sell or rent the castle economically.

After having been abandoned for many years, Redhouse Castle was incorporated into the estates of the Earl of Wemyss who resided at Gosford House close by.

Unlike other castles, Redhouse Castle was fortunate in that it was not exploited as a quarry. However, the same red sandstone from which it was built was also used for the foundations of Gosford House.

== Motto ==
The Layng family motto carved into the pediment is "Nisi Dominus Frustra", translated from the Latin as "without the Lord, all is in vain", taken from Psalm 127: "Except the Lord build the house, they labour in vain that build it". It is also the motto in the coat of arms of Edinburgh

== See also ==
- List of places in East Lothian
- List of castles in Scotland

== Photo gallery ==
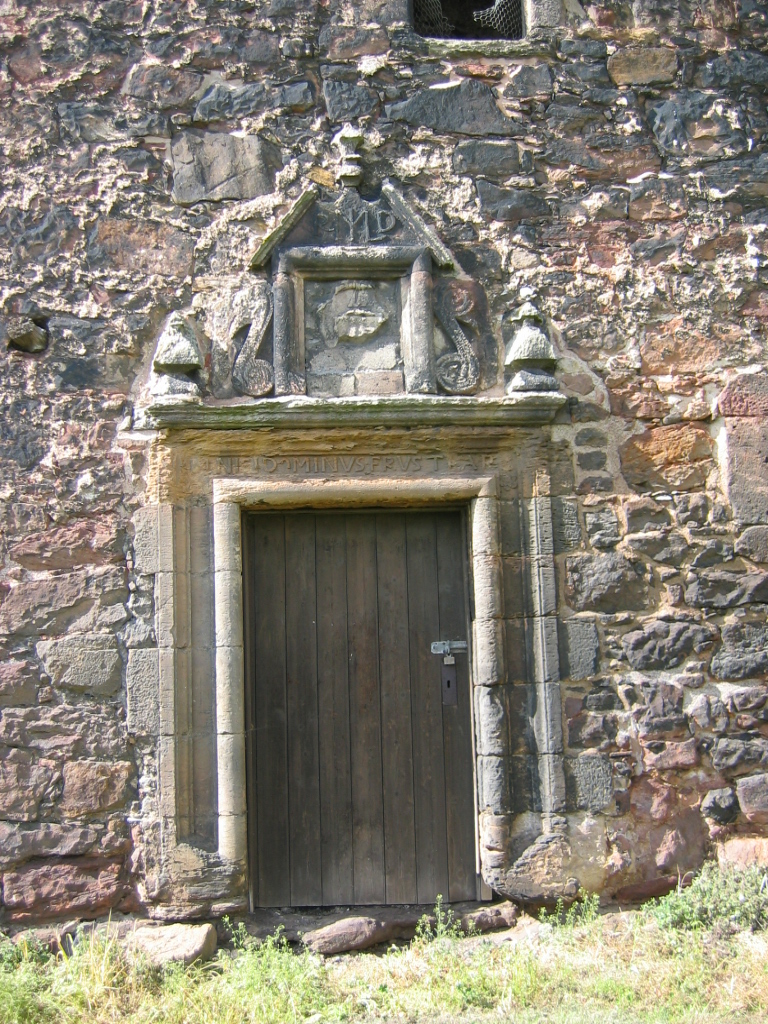

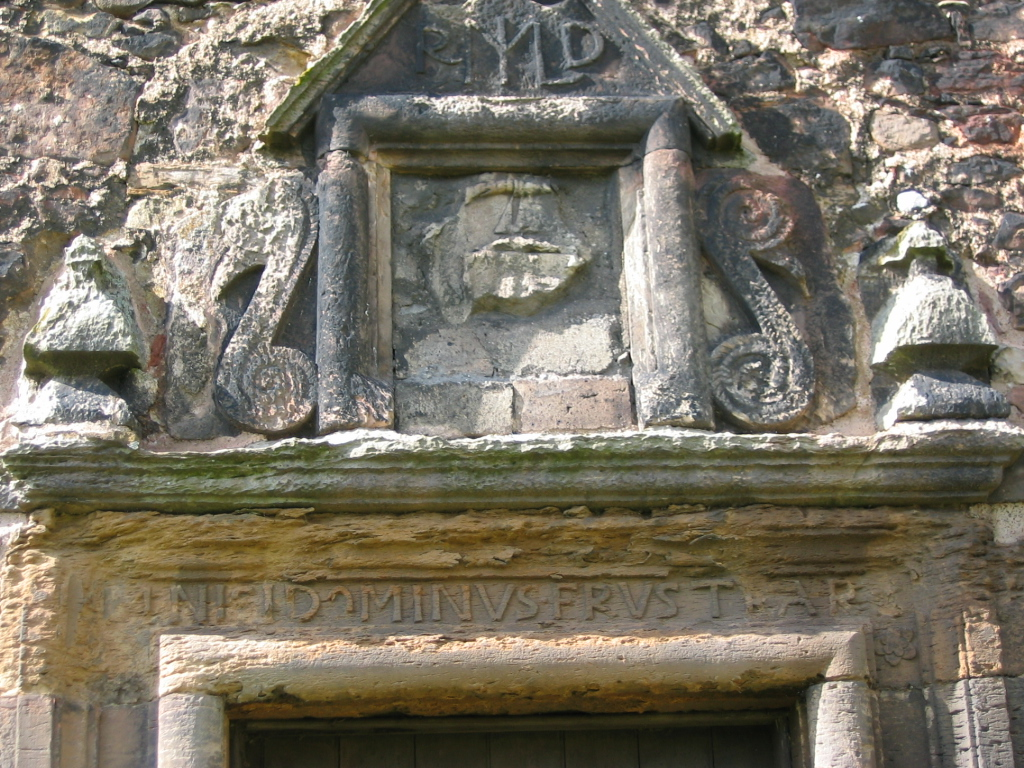

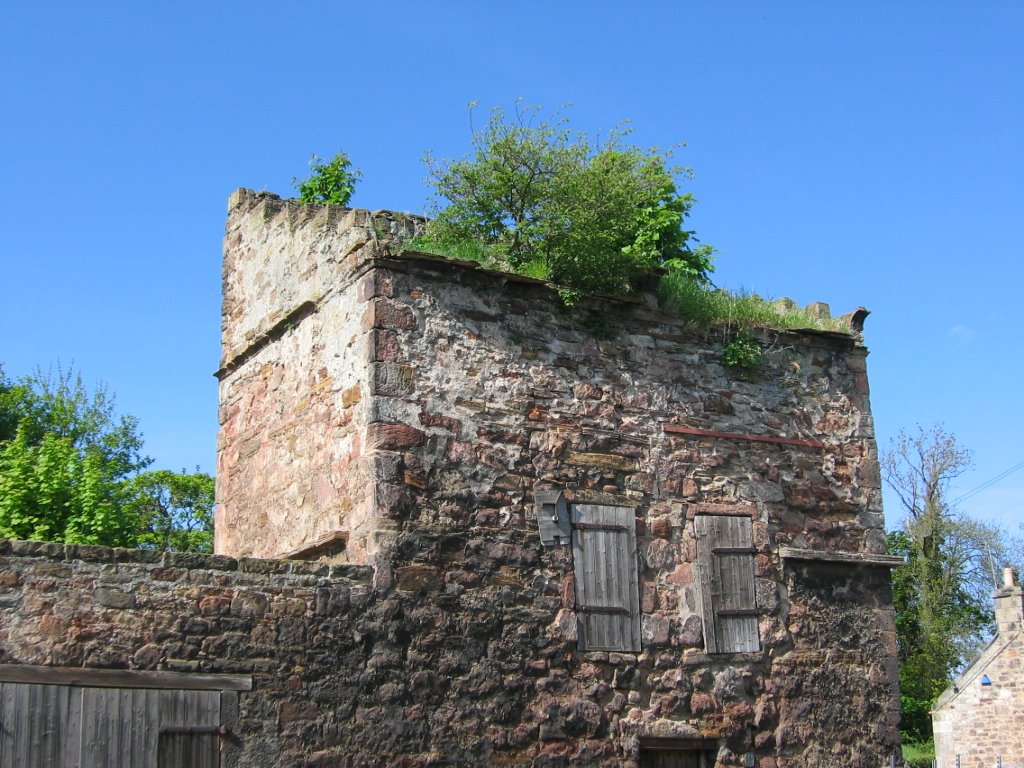

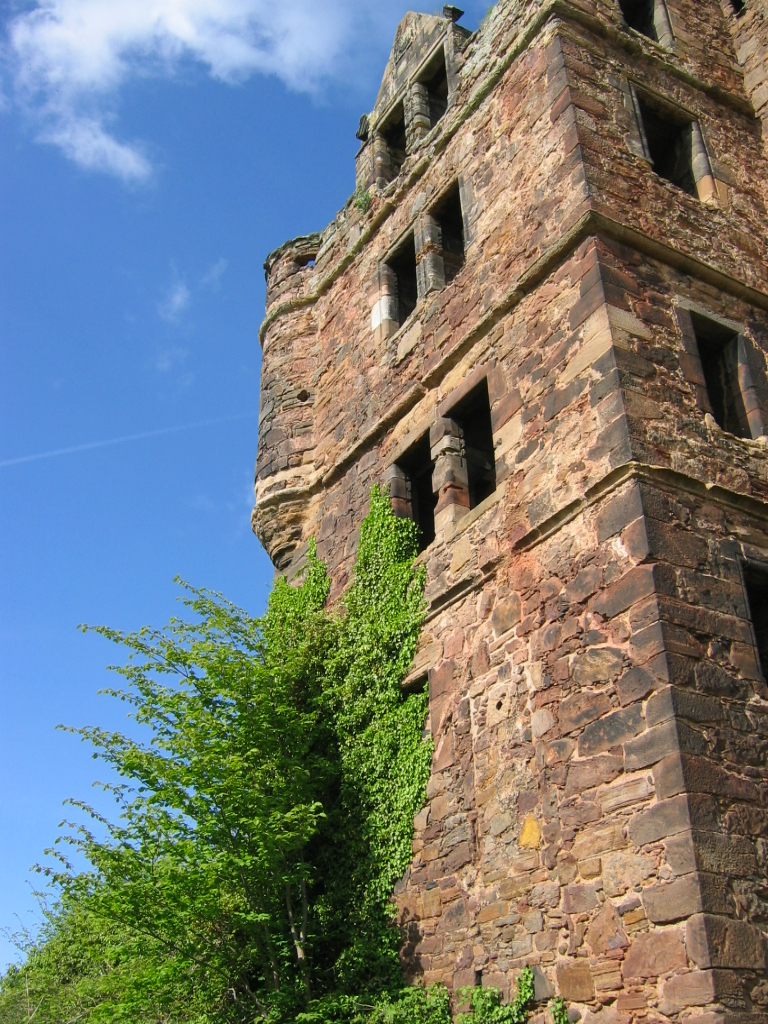

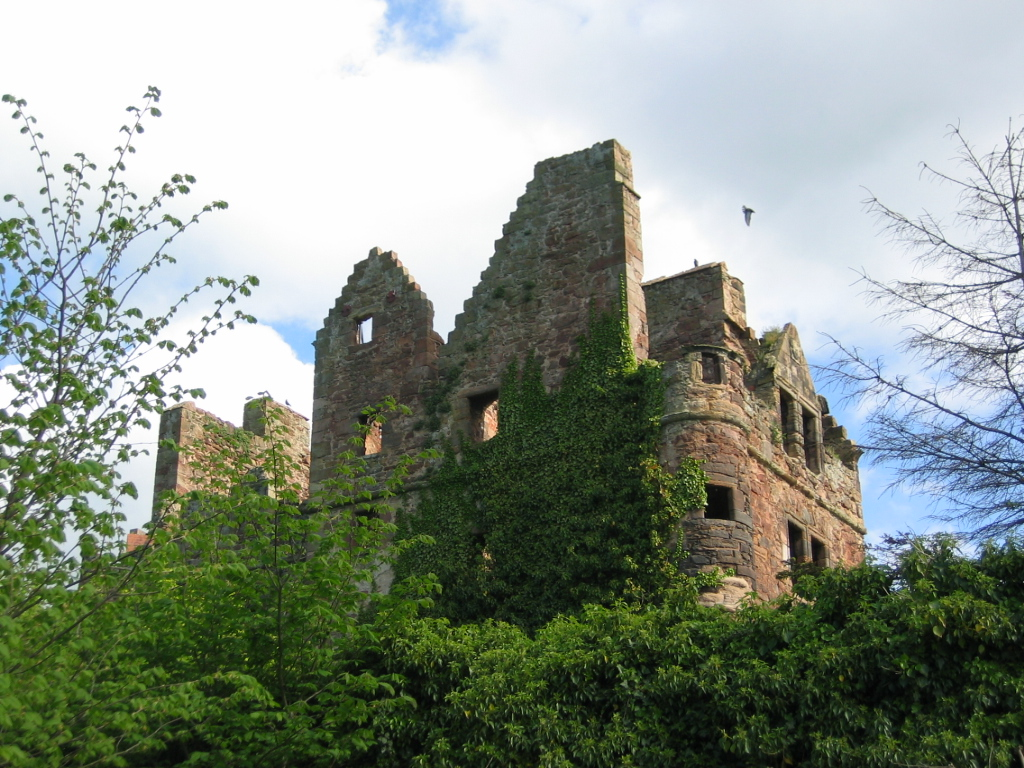

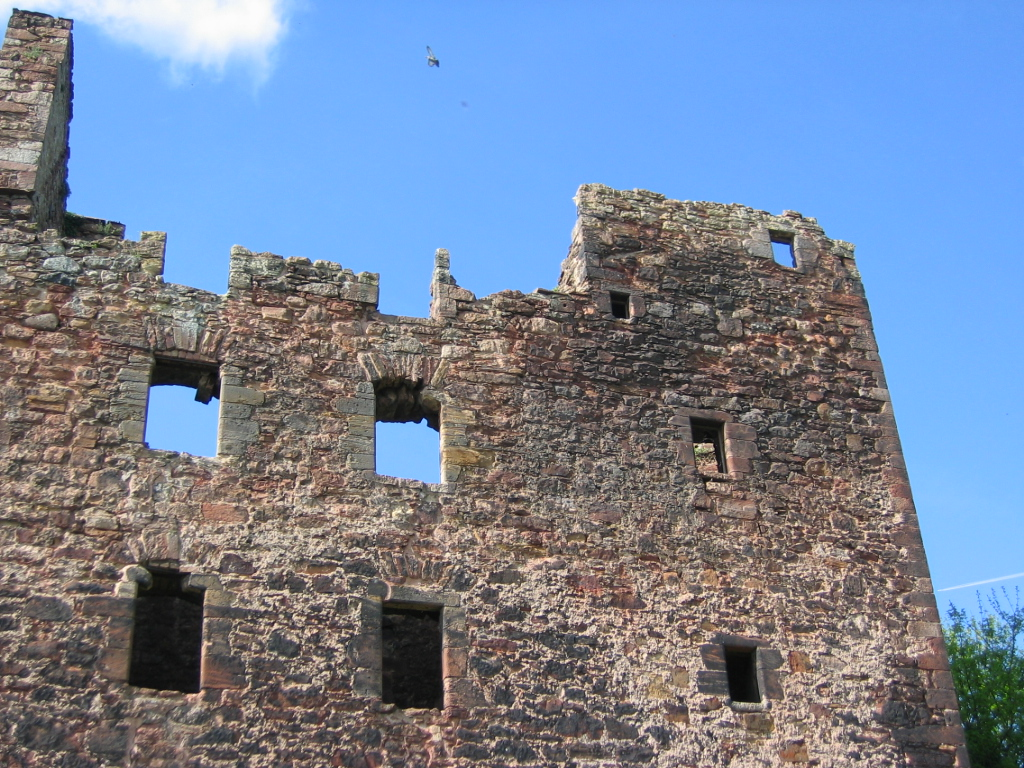

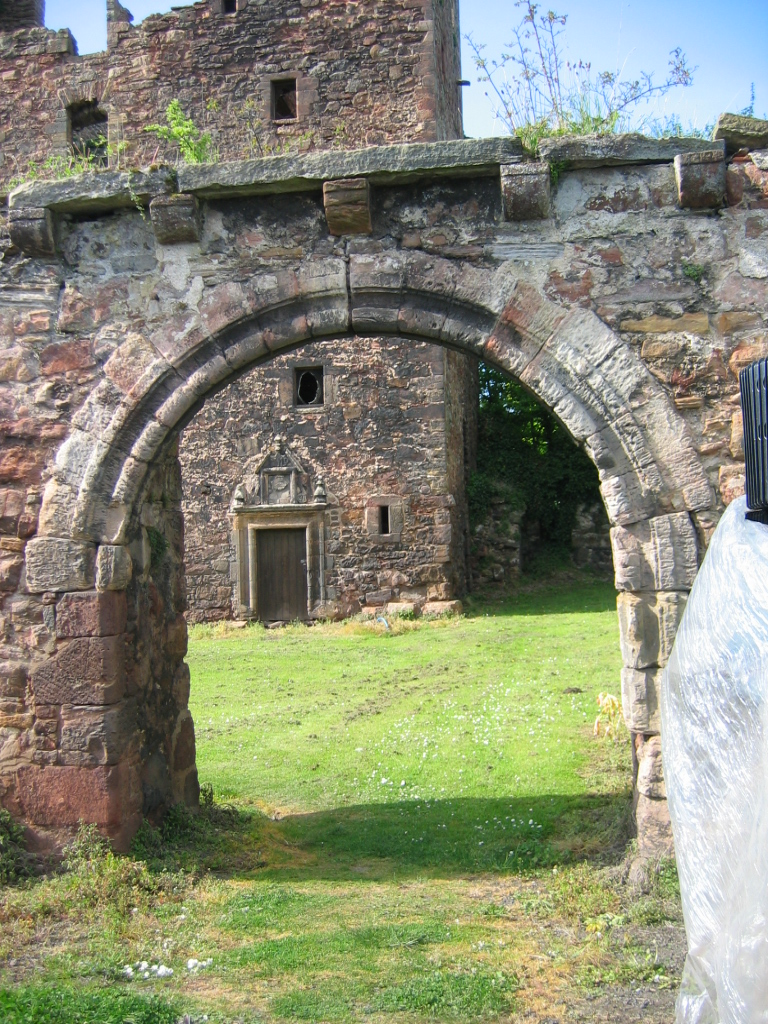
