= David MacGill =

Scottish judge

David MacGill, McGill or Makgill, Lord Cranston Riddell (1532–1595) was a 16th-century Scottish judge and Senator of the College of Justice and Lord Advocate from 1582 to 1595.

== Life ==
He was born around 1532 in or near Edinburgh, the son of James MacGill of Nesbit, an Edinburgh burgess, and Provost of Edinburgh 1570/71 and his wife, Helen Wardlaw. He was born in the family home of Oxenfoord Castle on the Cranstoun Riddel (Cranston Riddell) estate south-east of Dalkeith. His eldest brother was James MacGill, Lord Rankeillor.

In June 1582 he was elected a Senator of the College of Justice and took the title Lord Cranston Riddell.

He died in or near Edinburgh on 13 February 1595. His place on the Senate was taken by his eldest son, also David MacGill in 1597, who continued the title Lord Cranston Riddell, causing some confusion between father and son.

== Family ==
On 11 May 1557 he married Elizabeth Forrester of Corstorphine. They had at least six children, the eldest being David Makgill (1558-1607).

His second son, Sir James MacGill was also a Senator and also known as Lord Cranston Riddell. He was later created Viscount of Oxfuird.

== See also ==
- Clan Makgill
