= James Graham, 3rd Marquess of Montrose =

17th-century Scottish aristocrat

James Graham, 3rd Marquess of Montrose PC (30 October 1657 – 25 April 1684) was a Scottish nobleman. He was the grandson of James Graham, 1st Marquess of Montrose, who was made Marquess of Montrose in 1644 by Charles I.

The eldest son of James Graham, 2nd Marquess of Montrose and Lady Isabel Douglas (daughter of William Douglas, 7th Earl of Morton and Lady Anne Keith), he succeeded to the Marquessate of Montrose in 1669. He was educated at Glasgow University. He was appointed to the Privy Council of Scotland in 1678, and served as President of the Privy Council of Scotland between 1682 and 1684.

In 1681, he married Lady Christian Leslie, daughter of John Leslie, 1st Duke of Rothes and Lady Anne Lindsay. They had one son, James, who was made 1st Duke of Montrose in 1707.
