= Charles Hamilton, 5th Earl of Haddington =

Scottish nobleman

Coat of arms of the Earls of Haddington before 1858.

Charles Hamilton, 5th Earl of Haddington (1650 – May 1685), was a Scottish nobleman.

== Life ==
Known as Lord Binning from birth, he was born in 1650, the only son to survive infancy of John Hamilton, 4th Earl of Haddington, and Lady Christian Lindsay.

Binning succeeded his father's titles in 1669. He did not involve himself actively in politics, but was broadly supportive of his kinsman the Duke of Hamilton's machinations with Lauderdale. He refused to be a signatory to the Scottish Test Act of 1681 which put him even further from public life.

At Linton Bridge, near Prestonkirk, Haddingtonshire, Charles, fitted up for Gilbert Rule a meeting-house, which was indulged by the privy council on 18 December 1679. Next year, while Rule was visiting his niece, Mrs. Kennedy, in Edinburgh, he baptised her child in St. Giles's Church, after preaching a weekday lecture there, on the invitation of the minister, Archibald Turner, the Episcopal minister. For this offence Rule was brought before the privy council, and imprisoned on the Bass Rock.

Haddington died in May 1685 at Tyninghame House, East Lothian.

== Marriage and issue ==
Lord Haddington married Lady Margaret Leslie, daughter of John Leslie, 1st Duke of Rothes. Lady Margaret was heiress to her father's earldom of Rothes, but not his dukedom. In the terms of the marriage contract, to prevent the Rothes title becoming extinct, it was arranged that any firstborn son would assume the surname Leslie, and be heir to the earldom of Rothes, and any second born son would be heir to the earldom of Haddington. They had issue:

- John Hamilton-Leslie, 9th Earl of Rothes
- Thomas Hamilton, 6th Earl of Haddington
- Hon. Charles Hamilton, died young
- Lady Anna Hamilton, died in infancy

Peerage of Scotland
Preceded by John Hamilton	Earl of Haddington; 1669–1685	Succeeded by Thomas Hamilton
