= John Hamilton, 4th Earl of Haddington =

Scottish nobleman

Coat of arms of the Earls of Haddington before 1858

John Hamilton, 4th Earl of Haddington (1626 – 31 August 1669) was a Scottish nobleman.

== Life ==
Haddington was born in 1626, second son of Thomas Hamilton, 2nd Earl of Haddington and Lady Catherine Erskine, a daughter of John Erskine, Earl of Mar.

Lord Haddington was a minor in 1645, when he succeeded his brother Thomas who had died from consumption in that year. Owing to lameness, Haddington did not participate in the military, but was a conscientious attender of Parliament. Haddington attended the coronation of Charles II at Scone Abbey in 1651, and was later fined the sum of £555 11s 8d under Cromwell's Act of Grace.

Haddington died on 31 August 1669 at Tyninghame House, East Lothian.

== Marriage and issue ==
In 1648, Lord Haddington wed Lady Christian Lindsay (d.1704), daughter to the Lord Treasurer of Scotland, John Lindsay, 17th Earl of Crawford, and had issue:

- Charles Hamilton, 5th Earl of Haddington
- Hon. Thomas Hamilton, died in infancy
- Hon. John Hamilton, died in infancy
- Hon. William Hamilton, died in infancy
- Lady Margaret Hamilton, married John Hope of Hopetoun, and had issue: Charles Hope, 1st Earl of Hopetoun
- Lady Catherine Hamilton, died in infancy
- Lady Anna Hamilton, died in infancy
- Lady Helen Hamilton, married William Anstruther
- Lady Susanna Hamilton, married Adam Cockburn, Lord Ormiston
- Lady Christian Hamilton, died in infancy
- Lady Elizabeth Hamilton, died in infancy
- Lady Mary Hamilton

Peerage of Scotland
Preceded by Thomas Hamilton	Earl of Haddington; 1645–1669	Succeeded by Charles Hamilton
