= James Graham, 2nd Marquess of Montrose =

Scottish nobleman and judge

The Most Honourable The Marquess of Montrose

Extraordinary Lord of Session
- In office 1668–1669
- Preceded by: Earl of Kincardine
- Succeeded by: Earl of Dunfermline

Personal details
- Born: c. 1631 Kincardine, Blackford, Perthshire, Scotland
- Died: 23 February 1669 (aged 37–38) Mugdock Castle, Milngavie, Stirlingshire, Scotland
- Spouse: Lady Isabella Douglas
- Children: James Graham, 3rd Marquess of Montrose
- Parent(s): James Graham, 1st Marquess of Montrose; Lady Magdalene Carnegie
- Nickname: "James the Good"

James Graham, 2nd Marquess of Montrose (c. 1631 – February 1669) was a Scottish nobleman and judge, nicknamed the "Good" Marquess.

== Early life ==
He was the second son of James Graham, 1st Marquess of Montrose, by his wife, Lady Magdalene Carnegie, daughter of David Carnegie, 1st Earl of Southesk. His paternal grandparents were John Graham, 4th Earl of Montrose and Lady Margaret Ruthven (daughter of William Ruthven, 1st Earl of Gowrie).

Shortly after the death of his elder brother at the Bog of Gight in 1645, he was seized by General John Urry at Montrose, Angus where, aged about 14 years, he was attending school with a tutor. They were for a time imprisoned in Edinburgh Castle.

== Montrose estate ==
On the execution of the 1st Marquess of Montrose for high treason on 20 May 1650, the Montrose estates were forfeited. After the defeat of Charles II in 1652, Montrose made an appearance in London, was received by Oliver Cromwell, and quickly departed for Scotland, where his estates were restored to him. In the following year, he took part in the rising in the Highlands under William Cunningham, 9th Earl of Glencairn.

In March 1653–54, he quarreled there to the point of violence with his hereditary enemy Archibald Campbell, Lord Lorne, (courtesy title of the future 9th Earl of Argyll). When matters in the Highlands began to look desperate, he and Glencairn sent to George Monck that they might surrender, on terms of life. Shortly afterwards, Montrose with a force of two hundred men was completely routed by a smaller force under Cornet Peas. He and his party then made separate peace terms with Monck, agreeing on the 23rd to come to Dundee and give up their arms, and arrange securities.

After the Restoration, Montrose took part in the state funeral of his father at Holyrood Abbey on 1 January 1661. He declined to vote at the trial of Archibald Campbell, 1st Marquess of Argyll, in the following April, saying he could not be impartial. Montrose made a monetary claim against his son, Archibald Campbell, 9th Earl of Argyll, as a recompense for lands which had been given to the Marquess of Montrose on his father's forfeitures. The matter led to litigation between them, but a negotiated arrangement was reached, and on 23 February 1667 they drank each other's health in the presence of the lord commissioners.

Montrose was appointed an extraordinary lord of session on 25 June 1668.

== Personal life ==
Montrose was married to Lady Isabella Douglas (1630–1673), the fifth daughter of William Douglas, 7th Earl of Morton. By his wife, Montrose had two sons and two daughters.

- James Graham, 3rd Marquess of Montrose (1657–1684), who married Lady Christian Leslie.
- Lord Charles Graham, who died young in 1674.
- Anne Graham, who married Alexander Livingston, 3rd Earl of Callendar.
- Jane Graham, who married Jonathan Urquhart of Cromarty.
- Grizel Graham, who married William, the second son of William, Lord Cochrane.

He died in February 1669, and Argyll, whom he appointed guardian to his son, journeyed from Inverary to Perthshire to attend his funeral.

=== Descendants ===
His grandson, James Graham, was elevated from the 4th Marquess of Montrose to the 1st Duke of Montrose in 1707 as a reward for his important support of the Act of Union, whilst being Lord President of the Scottish Privy Council. He was Lord High Admiral of Scotland from 1705 to 1706. He was Keeper of the Privy Seal of Scotland from 1709 to 1713 and served as Keeper of the Great Seal of Scotland from 1716 to 1733. He was also a Lord of the Regency for Great Britain in 1714, upon the death of Queen Anne.

Peerage of Scotland
Preceded by James Graham	Marquess of Montrose; 1650–1669	Succeeded by James Graham
