= Thomas Hamilton, 1st Earl of Haddington =

Scottish judge, administrator

The Right Honourable The Earl of Haddington
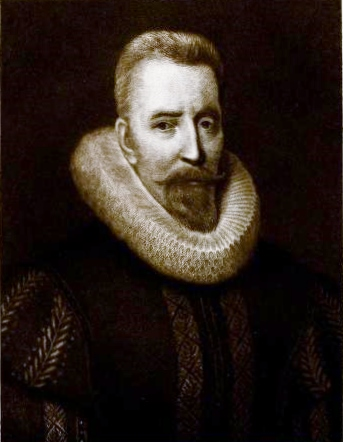
- Portrait of Lord Haddington

Keeper of the Privy Seal of Scotland
- In office 1583–1595
- Preceded by: Sir Richard Cockburn of Clerkington
- Succeeded by: Robert Ker

Lord Advocate
- In office 1612–1596
- Preceded by: David MacGill
- Succeeded by: Sir William Oliphant
- In office 1595–1596
- Preceded by: Andrew Logie
- Succeeded by: David MacGill

Personal details
- Born: Thomas Hamilton; 1563
- Died: 29 May 1637 (aged 73–74)
- Spouses: Margaret Borthwick (m. 1588; died 1596) Margaret Foulis (m. 1597; died 1609) Julian Ker (m. 1613; died 1637)
- Children: 4, including Thomas
- Parent(s): Sir Thomas Hamilton; Elizabeth Heriot
- Relatives: Andrew Hamilton, Lord Redhouse (brother)

Thomas Hamilton, 1st Earl of Haddington (1563 – 29 May 1637), designated before his peerage as 'of Drumcarny, Monkland, and Binning', was a Scottish administrator, Lord Advocate, judge, and Lord Lieutenant of Haddingtonshire.

== Family ==
The son of Sir Thomas Hamilton of Priestield, a judge of the Court of Session as Lord Prestonfield, by his first wife Elizabeth, daughter of James Heriot of Trabroun, Haddingtonshire. His younger brother was Andrew Hamilton, Lord Redhouse.

Thomas was educated in Paris. He became known as Thomas Hamilton of Drumcarny.

== Career ==
He was admitted an Advocate in 1587, a Lord of Session in 1592, appointed Lord Advocate in 1596. On 22 November 1596, James VI ordered him to try Jonet Garvie at an assize for witchcraft. He was Lord Clerk Register from 1612, and in 1616 became Lord President of the Court of Session.

=== Administrator ===
He was on very friendly terms with James VI, his legal talents being useful to the king. In July 1593 he was appointed to a council to manage the estates and finances of Anne of Denmark. He was one of the eight men called the Octavians who were appointed to manage the finances of Scotland. Widely regarded as an able administrator, Hamilton was entrusted with a large share in the government of Scotland when James moved to London in 1603.

=== Anne of Denmark and Prince Henry ===
Hamilton was present at Stirling Castle on 10 May 1603 when Anne of Denmark argued with Marie Stewart, Countess of Mar and the Master of Mar to gain custody of her son Prince Henry. He wrote an account of the incident. Anne of Denmark, according to Hamilton, told Lady Paisley and her physician Martin Schöner that she had taken "balm water". The Earl of Montrose, Lord Chancellor of Scotland, made efforts to calm the controversy and help set Anne of Denmark on her way to England in June.

=== Silver mine at Hilderston ===
In 1606 a promising deposit of silver was found on Hamilton's land at Hilderston near Bathgate. For a time, Hamilton worked the mine, employing the English mining entrepreneur Bevis Bulmer. Hamilton was appointed "Master of Metals" in Scotland in March 1607. Bulmer left the works in August 1608. The dissolution of their partnership was acrimonious. In January 1608 King James decided to claim the mine for himself. Hamilton was compensated for his loss by the King by May 1608, around the time a daughter Anna Hamilton was born, according to a letter from Jane Drummond.

=== Lord Clerk Register ===
In 1612 he was appointed Lord Clerk Register to the Privy Council to succeed John Skene. After the death of James VI, the earl resigned his offices, but served Charles I as Keeper of the Privy Seal of Scotland. Thomas was referred to familiarly by his friends as 'Tam o' the Cowgate', his Edinburgh residence being in that street.

=== Petition in 1617 ===
On 5 April, as Lord Secretary of Scotland, Lord Binning attended a meeting at Whitehall Palace to discuss proposals for Prince Charles to marry a French princess.

King James I came to Scotland in 1617. Anne Ker, the wife of John Elphinstone, 2nd Lord Balmerino, described how her sister, Julian Ker, Lady Binning, presented a petition on behalf of Robert Carr, 1st Earl of Somerset to the King at Holyrood Palace. Hamilton's wife was Somerset's sister. The petitioners, Somerset's Scottish allies, including Hamilton, kneeled in the privy gallery while Lady Binning gave the petition to the king. Hamilton then discussed the petition with the king afterwards, but it did not lead to the release of the earl.

=== Peerages ===
On 19 November 1613, he was created a Lord of Parliament as Lord Binning. Further, on 20 March 1619, he was created Earl of Melrose. Upon the death of the first and last Viscount of Haddington (on 28 February 1626), the king agreed to exchange the title of Earl of Melrose to that of Earl of Haddington, with the original precedence and remainder to heirs male bearing the surname and Arms of Hamilton. In 1628 The Earl of Haddington purchased the Tyninghame estate for 200,000 merks.

In 1624, under the title of Thomas Hamilton, Earl of Melrose, he purchased Balgone House south-east of North Berwick.

== Personal life ==
Lord Haddington was married three times and widowed three times. His first marriage was in c. 1588 to Margaret Borthwick (d. Dec 1596), only child of James Borthwick of Newbyres, by whom he had two daughters.

After her death, he married Margaret Foulis (d. 1609) in 1597. She was a daughter of James Foulis of Colinton, and sister of the financier Thomas Foulis. The dowry was 9000 merks. Before her death on 31 May 1609, they were the parents of:

- Thomas Hamilton, 2nd Earl of Haddington (1600–1640), who married Catherine Erskine, daughter of Marie Stewart, Countess of Mar; a covenanter, he was killed at Dunglass Castle in an explosion on 30 August 1640.
- Sir James Hamilton of Priestfield (1603–1638), who married Anna Hepburn, daughter of Patrick Hepburn of Waughton.
- Sir John Hamilton of Trabroun (1605–1638), who married Marjory Campbell and Lady Katherine Peebles; he dvp.
- Lady Jean Hamilton (1607–1642), who married John Kennedy, 6th Earl of Cassilis, and had issue, including Lady Margaret Burnet, who married Gilbert Burnet, later Bishop of Salisbury, in c. 1672.

His third marriage was to Julian, Lady Hume (née Ker) on 3 September 1613. She was a daughter of Sir Thomas Ker of Ferniehirst, and widow of Sir Patrick Hume of Polwarth, by whom he had another son:

- Robert Hamilton (1614–1640), who never married; he was killed in the explosion at Dunglass Castle.

Lady Haddington died in 1637 and was buried 30 March 1637. Lord Haddington died on 29 May 1637 and was succeeded in his titles by his son, Thomas.

=== Material culture ===
An inventory of silverware belonging to Thomas Hamilton was made in 1607. Some of the silver was kept in a press in the high hall of one of his houses. His daughter had the key. Other silverware was held by his steward, James Bisset. Hamilton had some silver at Barnbougle Castle and more at the Byres and Preistfield. An inventory was also made in July 1615 of the household furnishing at the Byres.

Hamilton made over furnishings at Tyninghame House to his heir in June 1635. This list included items which he had "brought home", meaning that he had purchased them in London or imported them. There was a new suite of tapestry of eight pieces of the History of David, and a new History of Abraham in six pieces. There were rich hangings of the Story of Jacob and other subjects, with ten other tapestries, eight pieces of old tapestry, and striped and embroidered cloth hangings for walls with a matching window curtain. An inventory of the whole furnishings of Tyningham was made at this time.

Political offices
Preceded by Sir Richard Cockburn of Clerkington	Keeper of the Privy Seal of Scotland; 1583–1595	Succeeded by Robert Ker
Legal offices
Preceded by Andrew Logie	Lord Advocate; 1595–1596	Succeeded by David MacGill
Preceded by David MacGill	Lord Advocate; 1596–1612	Succeeded by Sir William Oliphant
Peerage of Scotland
New creation	Earl of Melrose; 1619–1627	Disclaimed
New creation	Earl of Haddington; 1627–1637	Succeeded by Thomas Hamilton
New creation	Lord Binning; 1613–1637	Succeeded by Thomas Hamilton
