= Robert Haldane-Duncan, 1st Earl of Camperdown =

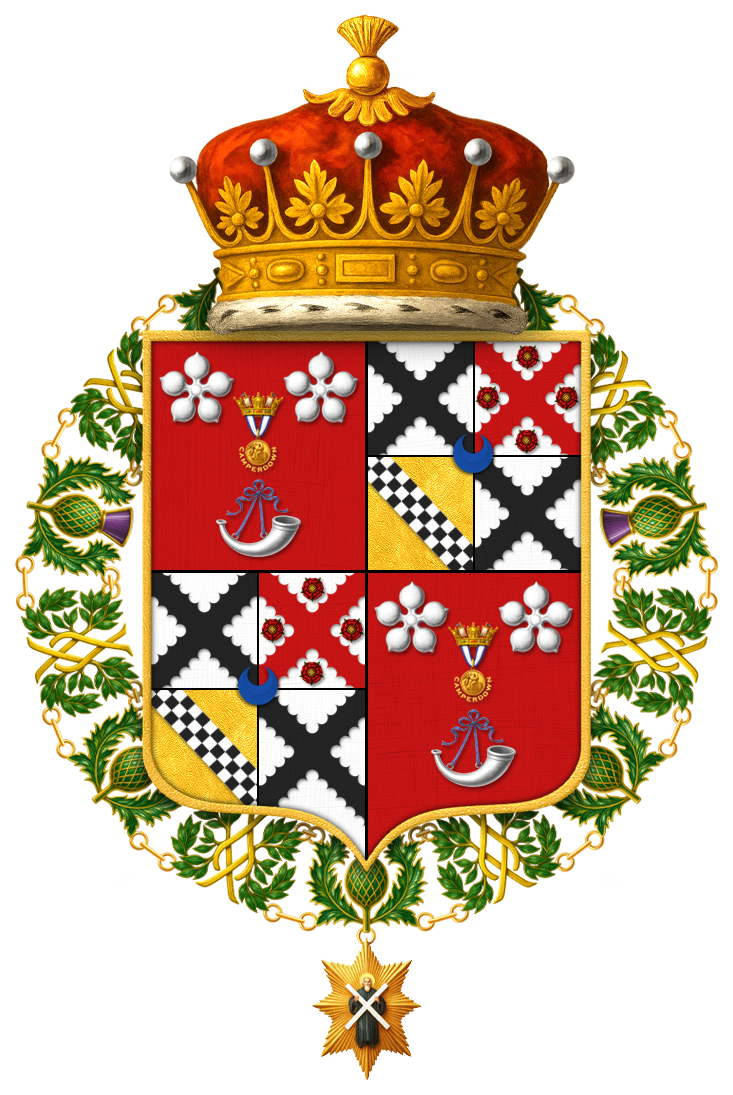
Shield of Arms of Robert Dundas Haldane-Duncan, 1st Earl of Camperdown, KT, encircled by the collar of the Order of the Thistle.

Robert Dundas Haldane-Duncan, 1st Earl of Camperdown KT (21 March 1785 – 22 December 1859), styled Lord Duncan from 1797 to 1804 and known as Viscount Duncan from 1804 to 1831, was a British soldier and aristocrat.

== Early life ==
Robert was born on 21 March 1785. He was the third, but eldest surviving, son and heir of Admiral Adam Duncan, 1st Viscount Duncan of Camperdown, and the former Henrietta Dundas. His father was a well known British admiral who defeated the Dutch fleet off Camperdown in what is considered one of the most significant actions in naval history. His father had been created a peer of Great Britain by George III in 1797.

His paternal grandparents were Alexander Duncan, Baron of Lundie, who served as Provost of Dundee, and (his first cousin once removed) Helen Haldane (a daughter of John Haldane of Gleneagles). His paternal great-uncle, Sir William Duncan, 1st Baronet, was physician-extraordinary to King George III. His mother was the third daughter of Rt. Hon. Robert Dundas of Arniston, Lord President of the Court of Session, and Anne Gordon (a daughter of Sir William Gordon, 1st Baronet, of Invergordon).

== Career ==
Duncan was an Ensign in the Coldstream Guards in 1797. He succeeded his father on 4 August 1804 as the 2nd Viscount Duncan of Camperdown and 20th Laird of Gleneagles. He was Grand Master of Scottish Freemasons from 1812 to 1814.

On 12 September 1831, he was created Earl of Camperdown, of Lundie in the County of Forfar and of Gleneagles in the County of Perth by King William IV in the Peerage of the United Kingdom and assumed the additional surname of Haldane, that of his maternal grandmother. On 12 May 1848, he was appointed a Knight of the Thistle.

=== Camperdown House ===
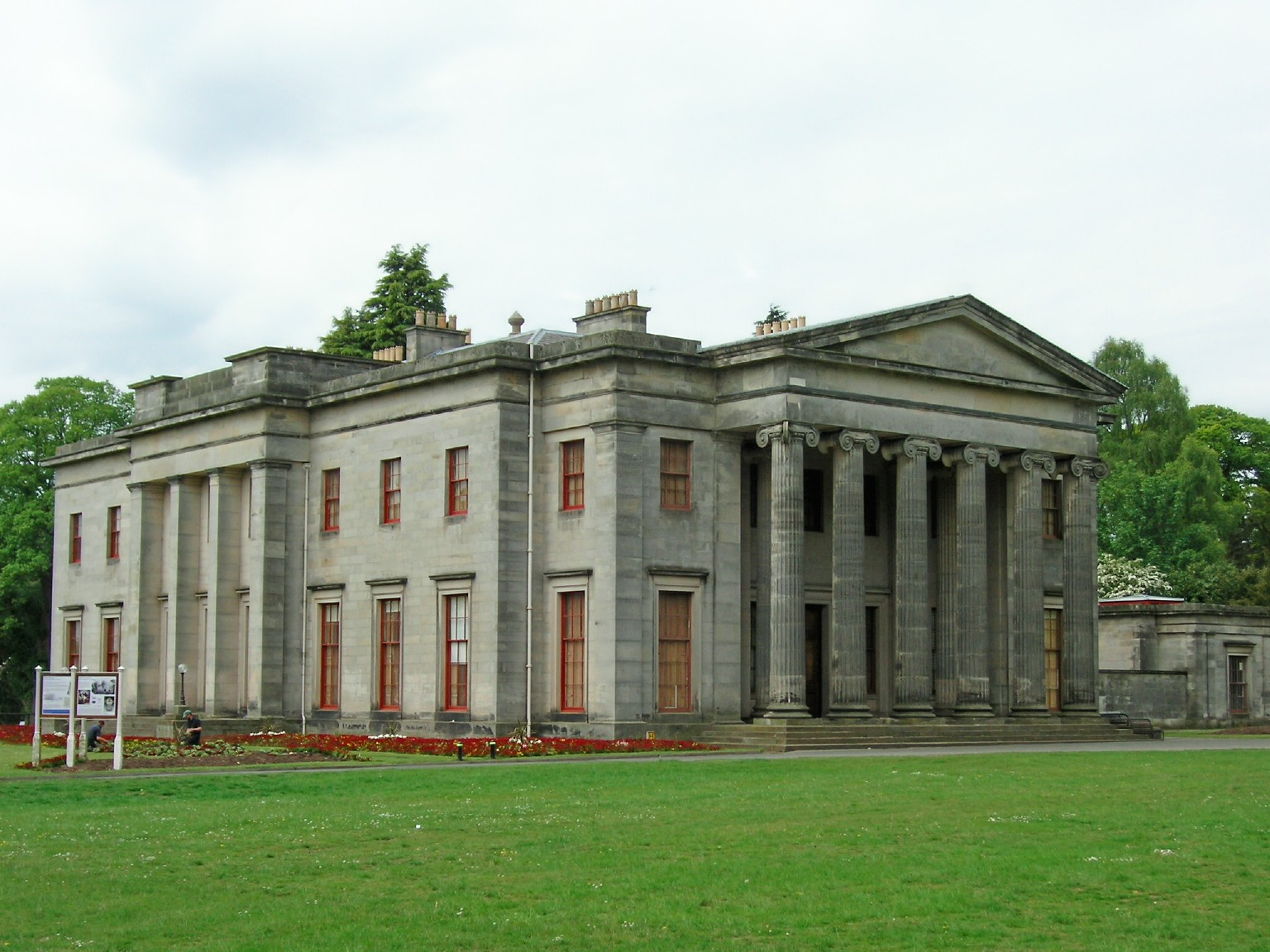
Camperdown House

In 1828, Lord Duncan had William Burn build him Camperdown House, a Palladian villa near Dundee, using the state pension he obtained for the Duncan family to build the house. Lord Duncan renamed the house and estate Camperdown in memory of his father's victory. The parklands surrounding the house were laid out by Lord Camperdown, with the assistance of his forester David Taylor, who along with his son planted most of the estate's trees between 1805 and 1859.

After the death of the 4th Earl in 1933, the earldom became extinct, and Camperdown was inherited by a cousin, Georgiana, widow of the 7th Earl of Buckinghamshire. On her death in 1937, the contents were sold, and the house followed, being bought by the Corporation of Dundee in 1946. Camperdown Country Park officially opened to the public in 1949.

== Personal life ==
On 8 June 1805, he was married Janet Hamilton-Dalrymple (1783–1867) at North Berwick in Berwickshire. She was the second daughter of Sir Hew Dalrymple, 3rd Baronet and the former Janet Duff (a daughter of William Duff of Crombie). Together, they were the parents of:

- Hon. William Haldane-Duncan (1805–1805), who died in infancy.
- Adam Haldane-Duncan, 2nd Earl of Camperdown (1812–1867), who married Juliana Cavendish Philips, eldest daughter and co-heiress of Sir George Philips, 2nd Baronet.
- Hon. Alexina Haldane-Duncan (1807–1824), who died young.
- Lady Henrietta Dundas Haldane-Duncan (1808–1893), who married John James Allen, of Errol Park, a captain in the Royal Navy, in 1832.
- Lady Elizabeth Baillie Haldane-Duncan (1810–1886), who died unmarried.
- Hon. Mary Haldane-Duncan (1815–1820), who died young.
- Hon. Hew Adam Dalrymple Hamilton Haldane-Duncan (1820–1900), who married Edith Isabella Henderson, a daughter of Lt.-Gen. Douglas Mercer Henderson of Fordell in 1866.

Lord Camperdown died on 22 December 1859 and was succeeded in his titled by his eldest son, Adam, who had been an MP for Southampton, Bath, and Forfarshire. Lady Camperdown died on 17 May 1867.

=== Descendants ===
Through his son and heir Adam, he was a grandfather of Robert Haldane-Duncan, 3rd Earl of Camperdown (1841–1918), George Haldane-Duncan, 4th Earl of Camperdown (1845–1933), and the courtier and notable artist, Julia Abercromby, Baroness Abercromby (wife of George Abercromby, 4th Baron Abercromby).

Through his youngest son Hew, he was a grandfather of Georgiana Wilhelmina Mercer-Henderson (1867–1937), who married Sidney Hobart-Hampden-Mercer-Henderson, 7th Earl of Buckinghamshire.

Through his daughter Lady Henrietta, he was a grandfather of Wilhelmina Frederica Allen (d. 1931), who married Thomas Graves Law (a grandson of Edward Law, 1st Baron Ellenborough).

Peerage of Great Britain
Preceded by Adam Duncan	Viscount Duncan; 1804–1859	Succeeded by Adam Haldane-Duncan
Peerage of the United Kingdom
New creation	Earl of Camperdown; 1831–1859	Succeeded by Adam Haldane-Duncan
