= Camperdown Country Park =

Public park in the Camperdown area of Dundee

Camperdown House
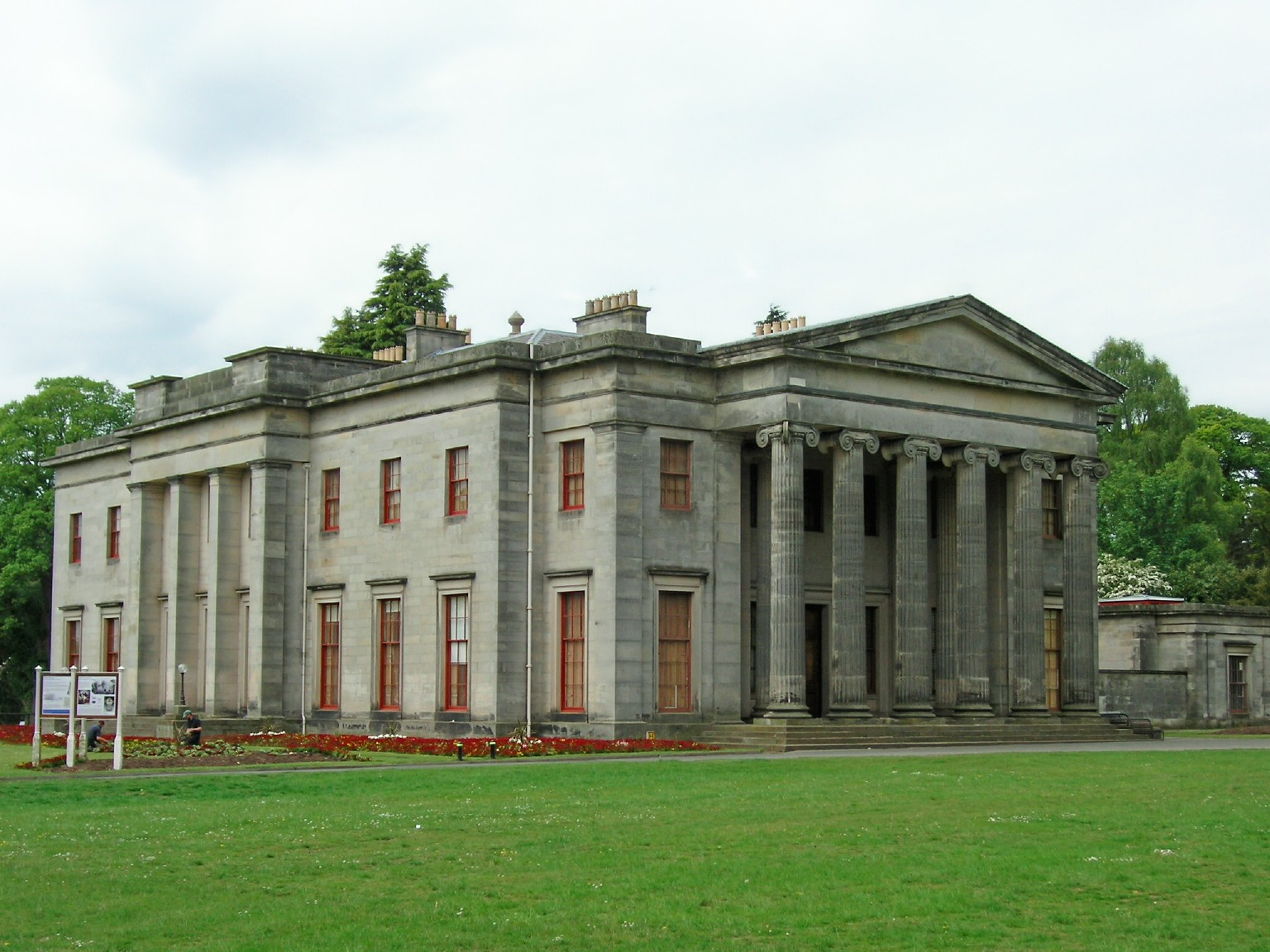
- Camperdown House, June 2006

- Location in Dundee
- 56.484°N 3.046°W

Site notes
- Area: 400 acres (1.6 km^{2})

Listed Building – Category A
- Designated: 12 July 1963
- Reference no.: LB25078

Inventory of Gardens and Designed Landscapes in Scotland
- Official name: Camperdown House
- Designated: 1 July 1987
- Reference no.: GDL00082

Camperdown Country Park, often known as just Camperdown Park, is a public park in the Camperdown area of Dundee, Scotland. The park comprises the former grounds of Camperdown House, a 19th-century mansion, which was bought by the city in 1946. Camperdown Park is home to a wildlife centre and recreational facilities. It is the largest park in Dundee, stretching to 400 acres (1.6 km^{2}). Over 190 species of tree are found in the park.

Camperdown House is the largest Greek Revival house remaining in Scotland. It is protected as a Category A listed building, and the park is included on the Inventory of Gardens and Designed Landscapes in Scotland, the national listing of significant parks.

== History ==
The Camperdown estate was originally known as Lundie, and was bought by Alexander Duncan in 1682. A 16th-century house stood on the estate at this time. Several members of the family served as provost of Dundee during the 18th century. In 1797, during the French Revolutionary Wars, Admiral Adam Duncan (1731–1804) commanded the Royal Navy fleet that defeated the Dutch at the Battle of Camperdown. He was rewarded by being raised to the peerage as Viscount Duncan.

In 1820, his son Robert, 2nd Viscount Duncan, commissioned William Burn to design a new house in the Greek Revival style. The earlier house was demolished, and the new house was completed in 1828. Lord Duncan renamed the house and estate Camperdown in memory of his father's victory, and in 1831 he was created Earl of Camperdown by William IV. The parklands surrounding the house were laid out by Lord Camperdown, with the assistance of his forester David Taylor, who along with his son planted most of the estate's trees between 1805 and 1859.

After the death of the 4th Earl in 1933, the earldom became extinct, and Camperdown was inherited by a cousin, Georgiana, widow of the 7th Earl of Buckinghamshire. On her death in 1937, the contents were sold, and the house followed, being bought by the Corporation of Dundee in 1946. Camperdown Country Park officially opened to the public in 1949.

Camperdown Park has been the host venue for BBC Radio 1's Big Weekend twice, the first time in 2006, and again in 2023. It was due to host in 2020 however it was cancelled as a result of the COVID-19 pandemic. It is the only venue in Scotland to host the event twice.

Aside from hosting BBC Radio 1's Big Weekend, Camperdown Park also hosted Carnival Fifty Six in August 2017, which was intended to be an annual music festival for Dundee, similar to TRNSMT in Glasgow, however, it was cancelled after one year.

Since the success of Big Weekend, Camperdown began hosting Doof in the Park from 2025, an EDM festival organised by Dundonian DJ Hannah Laing and hosted the Ibiza Orchestra Experience and Summer in Nashville in August 2025.

The figurehead. from the Vryheid, flagship of the Dutch admiral De Winter at the battle of Camperdown, was on display in the park until it was vandalised in 1961.

== Facilities and features ==
=== Wildlife Centre ===
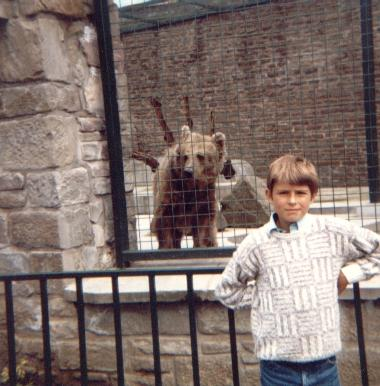
Jeremy the brown bear at Camperdown

The Camperdown Wildlife Centre is home to over three hundred animals, of fifty different species. The centre contains mainly mammals and birds but also houses several reptile species. The centre is a member of BIAZA (The British and Irish Association of Zoos and Aquariums), which promotes high standards of care for animals in zoo collections.

The park made news headlines in 1986, when Jeremy, its female European brown bear, bit the arm off ten-year-old Ross Prendergast, who had sneaked into the park after hours. A campaign was launched to stop the bear being put down. The bear enclosure has been enlarged since the incident, and there are now three different bears at the park.

Comet and Star, the two brown bears, were two of the most popular animals at the centre. Comet died in 2016 and Star was joined by three younger bears from another collection. Star died in 2018. One of Britain's rarest mammals, the pine marten, can also be found in the centre. Camperdown Wildlife Centre received its "zoo licence" in September 2003.

In 2007, the park was subjected to an attack by vandals who broke into the zoo and launched an assault on numerous different species. They used weapons including a pick axe, a knife and stakes. As a result of the attack, a fallow deer was left with a large wound on its side, a terrapin's eyes had been gouged out and a snowy owl had become so distressed that it cannibalised its own offspring. Following the incident, two boys, ages 11 and 13, were charged. A total of twenty-five animals had been injured.

=== Golf course ===
Camperdown Country Park had an eighteen-hole golf course which was 6,548 yards in length. It was opened in 1959 and became a very popular golf course in the area. During the 1970s the course held the British Police Championship, and (with the Downfield Golf Course) the Scottish Stroke-Play Championship. Following a cost-saving exercise by Dundee City Council, the decision was made to close the course permanently. It closed in April 2020.

=== Camperdown Elm ===
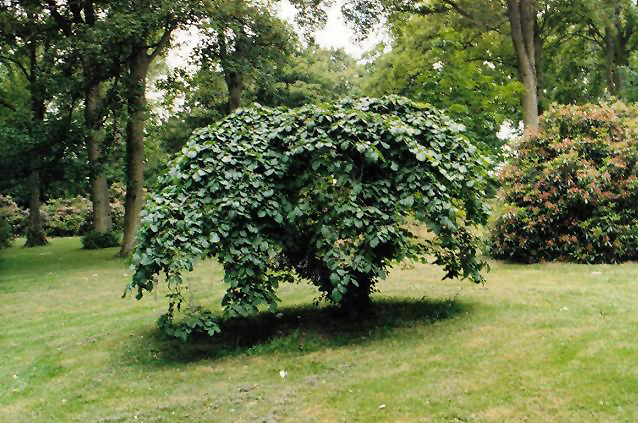
The original Camperdown elm, 1989

Camperdown is notable in horticulture as the origin of the Camperdown Elm (Ulmus glabra 'Camperdownii'), a short, broad, "weeping" variety of elm. The tree was discovered around 1835–1840 by Lord Camperdown's head forester, David Taylor, who noticed a mutant contorted wych elm branch sprawling along the ground. The earl's gardener produced the first Camperdown Elm by grafting it to the trunk of a normal wych elm (Ulmus glabra). Every Camperdown Elm is from a cutting taken from that original tree and is grafted on a U. glabra trunk.
