= Admiral Duncan =

Admiral Duncan may refer to:

- Admiral Adam Duncan, 1st Viscount Duncan (1731–1804), British Royal Navy admiral
- Admiral Duncan (pub), London pub, named after Admiral Adam Duncan
- Admiral Duncan (ship), several vessels
- Admiral Charles K. Duncan (1911–1994), U.S. Navy admiral
- Admiral Donald B. Duncan (1896–1975), U.S. Navy admiral
