= Robert Haldane-Duncan =

Robert Haldane-Duncan may refer to:

- Robert Haldane-Duncan, 3rd Earl of Camperdown (1841–1918), British politician
- Robert Haldane-Duncan, 1st Earl of Camperdown (1785–1859), British soldier and aristocrat
