= Adam Haldane-Duncan, 2nd Earl of Camperdown =

British nobleman and politician

The Right Honourable The Earl of Camperdown

Junior Lord of the Treasury
- In office 1855–1858
- Preceded by: Lord Alfred Hervey; Lord Elcho
- Succeeded by: Lord Henry Lennox; Thomas Edward Taylor; Henry Whitmore

Member of Parliament for Forfarshire
- In office 1854–1859
- Preceded by: Hon. Lauderdale Maule
- Succeeded by: Charles Carnegie

Member of Parliament for Bath
- In office 1841–1852 Serving with John Arthur Roebuck, Anthony Ashley-Cooper, George Treweeke Scobell
- Preceded by: The Viscount Powerscourt; William Bruges
- Succeeded by: Thomas Phinn; George Treweeke Scobell

Member of Parliament for Southampton
- In office 1837–1841 Serving with Abel Rous Dottin
- Preceded by: James Barlow-Hoy; Abel Rous Dottin
- Succeeded by: Lord Bruce; Charles Martyn

Personal details
- Born: Hon. Adam Duncan; 25 March 1812; Edinburgh, Scotland
- Died: 30 January 1867 (aged 54)
- Political party: Whig, Liberal
- Spouse: Juliana Cavendish Philips
- Relations: Adam Duncan, 1st Viscount Duncan (grandfather); Sir Hew Dalrymple, 3rd Baronet (grandfather)
- Children: Robert Haldane-Duncan, 3rd Earl of Camperdown; George Haldane-Duncan, 4th Earl of Camperdown; Julia Abercromby, Baroness Abercromby
- Parent: Robert Haldane-Duncan, 1st Earl of Camperdown
- Education: Eton College
- Alma mater: Trinity College, Cambridge

Adam Haldane-Duncan, 2nd Earl of Camperdown (25 March 1812 – 30 January 1867), styled Viscount Duncan between 1831 and 1859, was a British nobleman and politician.

== Early life ==
Hon. Adam Duncan was born in Edinburgh on 25 March 1812. He was the eldest surviving son of Robert Haldane-Duncan, 1st Earl of Camperdown and the former Janet Hamilton-Dalrymple (1783–1867).

His paternal grandparents were the former Henrietta Dundas and Adam Duncan, 1st Viscount Duncan, a well known British admiral who defeated the Dutch fleet off Camperdown in what is considered one of the most significant actions in naval history. His mother was the second daughter of Sir Hew Dalrymple, 3rd Baronet and the former Janet Duff (a daughter of William Duff of Crombie). Through his brother Hew, he was uncle to Georgiana Wilhelmina Mercer-Henderson (wife of the 7th Earl of Buckinghamshire), and through his sister Lady Henrietta, he was uncle to Wilhelmina Frederica Allen (wife of Thomas Graves Law, a grandson of the 1st Baron Ellenborough).

He was educated at Eton College and Trinity College, Cambridge.

== Career ==
He first entered parliament as a member for Southampton in 1837, which seat he held until 1841 when he exchanged it for Bath. He was briefly out of parliament between 1852 and 1854, when he was returned again, this time for Forfarshire. He held this seat until he was elevated to the House of Lords in 1859 on the death of his father.

== Personal life ==
On 23 May 1859, Viscount Duncan married Juliana Cavendish Philips, eldest daughter and co-heiress of Whig MP Sir George Philips, 2nd Baronet and Hon. Sarah Georgiana Cavendish (eldest daughter of Richard Cavendish, 2nd Baron Waterpark). Together, they were the parents of:

- Julia Janet Georgiana Haldane-Duncan (1840–1915), a notable artist and Lady of the Bedchamber to Queen Victoria who married George Abercromby, 4th Baron Abercromby.
- Robert Haldane-Duncan, 3rd Earl of Camperdown (1841–1918), a Civil Lord of the Admiralty from 1870 to 1874 who never married.
- George Haldane-Duncan, 4th Earl of Camperdown (1845–1933), a philanthropist who married American heiress Laura (née Dove) Blanchard, daughter of John Dove, in 1888.

Lord Camperdown died on 30 January 1867 at the age of 54. He was succeeded in his titles by his eldest son Robert. After Robert died unmarried in 1918, the earldom passed to his younger brother George, upon whose death in 1933 the earldom became extinct.

Parliament of the United Kingdom
Preceded by James Barlow-Hoy; Abel Rous Dottin	Member of Parliament for Southampton; 1837–1841; With: Abel Rous Dottin	Succeeded by Lord Bruce; Charles Martyn
Preceded by The Viscount Powerscourt; William Bruges	Member of Parliament for Bath; 1841–1852; With: John Arthur Roebuck to 1847; Anthony Ashley-Cooper1847–1851; George Treweeke Scobell, from 1851	Succeeded by Thomas Phinn; George Treweeke Scobell
Preceded by Hon. Lauderdale Maule	Member of Parliament for Forfarshire; 1854–1859	Succeeded by Charles Carnegie
Political offices
Preceded by Lord Alfred Hervey; Lord Elcho	Junior Lord of the Treasury; 1855–1858	Succeeded by Lord Henry Lennox; Thomas Edward Taylor; Henry Whitmore
Peerage of the United Kingdom
Preceded by Robert Haldane-Duncan	Earl of Camperdown; 1859–1867	Succeeded by Robert Haldane-Duncan
