= Henry Duncan (Royal Navy officer, born 1786) =

British Royal Navy captain

Captain The Honourable Sir Henry Duncan KCH CB
- Born: 1786
- Died: 1 November 1835 (age 49); Eaton Place, London
- Burial place: Kensal Green Cemetery, London
- Military career
- Allegiance: United Kingdom
- Branch: Royal Navy
- Service years: 1800–1823
- Rank: Captain
- Conflicts: Napoleonic Wars; Adriatic campaign of 1807–1814
- Awards: Knight Commander of the Royal Guelphic Order, Companion of the Order of the Bath

Captain Sir Henry Duncan KCH CB (1786 – 1 November 1835) was a prominent Royal Navy officer of the early nineteenth century. The second surviving son of the highly regarded Admiral Adam Duncan, 1st Viscount Duncan, who defeated the Dutch Navy at the Battle of Camperdown in 1797, Duncan achieved a successful career in his own right, operating with great success against French and Italian shipping and shore fortifications in the Mediterranean during the Napoleonic Wars. For his services he was knighted and given numerous honours before dying at the young age of 49 from a sudden apoplexy in 1835.

== Early career ==
Henry Duncan was born in 1786, the second surviving son of Adam Duncan, then a captain in the Royal Navy, later to become the admiral who defeated the Dutch fleet at the Battle of Camperdown and thus became Viscount Duncan. Henry's elder brother Robert inherited the titles on their father's death and was later created Earl of Camperdown. Their mother, Henrietta, was the daughter of Robert Dundas, a prominent Scottish judge. Following his father into the Navy at 14 in 1800, Duncan served as a midshipman on board the frigate HMS Maidstone until the Peace of Amiens the following year.

When the Navy was expanded once more at the outbreak of the Napoleonic Wars in 1803, Duncan joined HMS Narcissus in the Eastern Mediterranean and served in operations in the Aegean Sea and off Egypt. With Narcissus ordered back to Britain in 1804, Duncan joined the first rate HMS Royal Sovereign under Admiral Sir Richard Bickerton as a lieutenant and it was aboard this ship that he received news of the death of his father. The death of such a senior officer was marked by numerous letters of condolence, including one from Horatio Nelson which offered command of the small brig HMS Bittern, whose captain Robert Corbet had been taken ill. When Duncan arrived to take command however Corbet had recovered and was restored to command. Duncan was instead promoted to commander and returned to Britain to take over the 18-gun HMS Minorca in the Channel Fleet.

== Post captain ==
Returning to the Mediterranean, Duncan was promoted to post captain in 1806 and took over the sixth rate HMS Porcupine in 1807, sent to serve in the Adriatic campaign by operating off the coast of the Kingdom of Italy. In 1808 he moved to the small frigate HMS Mercury engaged on the same service, raiding French harbours in the Adriatic Sea and Eastern Mediterranean. During these operations, he captured numerous coastal merchant ships and destroyed large quantities of military supplies. With Mercury in a poor state of repair, Duncan was ordered to escort the Mediterranean merchant shipping back to Britain and pay the ship off, arriving in early 1810 after a stormy passage.

Duncan was then given the large frigate HMS Imperieuse and commanded her in the Western Mediterranean off Toulon and Tripoli, seizing a number of French merchant ships. Raiding the Northwestern coast of Italy, Duncan succeeded in capturing numerous ships and destroying large quantities of supplies in fortified harbours before Imperieuse was forced to undergo extensive repairs in Port Mahon. Offered two other frigates as replacements, Duncan was presented with a letter from Imperieuse's crew declaring their regard and respect for him and asking him not to move to another ship without them. Moved by this letter, Duncan remained with the ship and was given command of a squadron to operate against the Kingdom of Naples.

== Post war service ==
Returning to Britain in 1814 at the end of the War of the Sixth Coalition, Imperieuse was paid off and Duncan given command of the new HMS Glasgow. Operating off the Spanish Atlantic coast and in the Bay of Biscay, Duncan saw little action before the final end to the Napoleonic Wars in 1815 and his ship was paid off in September. Appointed a Companion of the Order of the Bath, Duncan was unemployed for three years before taking over the 50-gun fifth rate HMS Liffey which he commanded on anti-pirate operations in the West Indies and later escorted the Prince Regent on his fleet inspection in 1819, during which he praised Duncan and his ship. He subsequently conveyed Sir Charles Bagot, Ambassador to Russia, to Saint Petersburg and took despatches to Naples, remaining in the Mediterranean until 1821.

Marrying Mary Simson Crawford, the daughter of naval officer Captain James Coutts Crawford, in 1823, Duncan was briefly detached to Lisbon on confidential duties. He subsequently conveyed King George IV to Ireland and Calais before the ship was paid off and Duncan entered retirement. Except for occasional and largely ceremonial shore duties, Duncan did not serve in a naval capacity again. He had one surviving son, Adam Alexander and a daughter Anne Mary. A third child, Henry Robert, died at only a few days old. In December 1834, Duncan was knighted in the Royal Guelphic Order, but two years later suddenly collapsed and died at his London home in Eaton Place from apoplexy. He was buried in Kensal Green Cemetery, his funeral attended by many prominent serving naval officers.
