= Lord Duncan (ship) =

After Admiral Lord Adam Duncan's victory at the Battle of Camperdown in 1797, numerous British vessels in the few remaining years of the 18th century were named Lord Duncan:

- Lord Duncan (1798 ship) was launched in New Brunswick in 1798. She transferred to Britain circa 1799. A French privateer captured her in 1800 but the Royal Navy recaptured her. A second French privateer captured her in 1804 and took her into Guadeloupe.
- Lord Duncan (1798 EIC ship) was launched on the River Thames in 1798 as an East Indiaman. She made seven voyages for the British East India Company (EIC) before she was sold in 1813 for breaking up.
- Lord Duncan (1798 Liverpool ship) was launched at Dublin in 1787 under another name. Between 1799 and 1800 she made one voyage as a slave ship in the triangular trade in enslaved people. She was sold in 1800 after she had delivered her slaves.
- Lord Duncan (1798 slave ship) was a slave ship whose origins are obscure. She made one voyage in 1798–1799 in the triangular trade in enslaved people. She was condemned at Jamaica in 1800 after having delivered her slaves.
- Lord Duncan (1798 Sunderland ship) was launched at Sunderland in 1798. She initially traded with Smyrna, where in late 1801 she suffered a lightning strike. In 1806 she started trading with San Domingo and was blown up there in 1807 in an explosion.
- HMS Tickler was a cutter built at Dover in 1798 as the mercantile Lord Duncan. Between October 1798 and October 1801 she served the Royal Navy as the hired armed cutter Lord Duncan. Lord Duncan captured or recaptured several vessels, including one privateer. The Navy purchased Lord Duncan in October 1808 and renamed her HMS Tickler. It sold her in 1816.
