= Julia Abercromby, Baroness Abercromby =

British peeress and courtier

The Right Honourable The Lady Abercromby
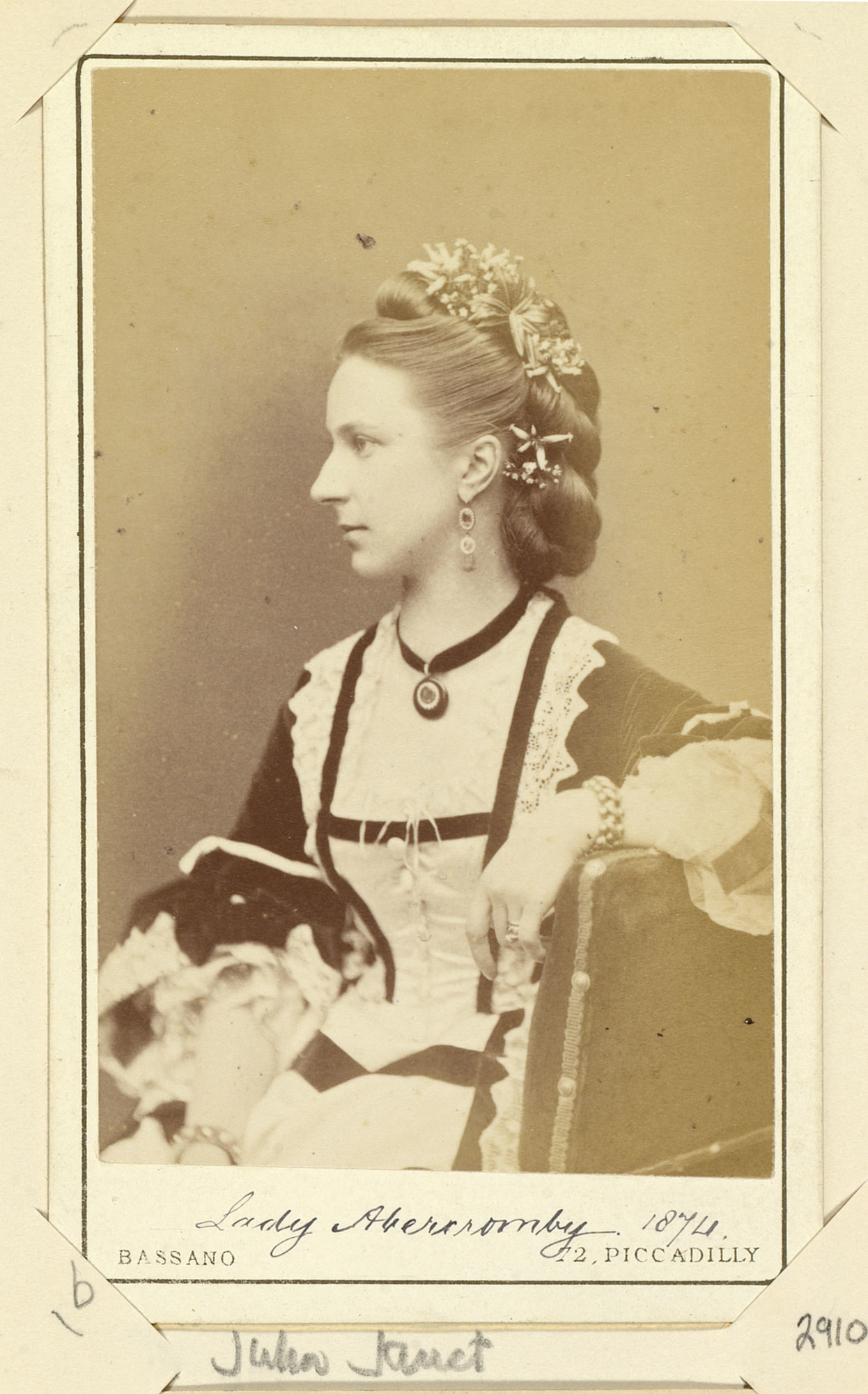
- Born: Julia Janet Georgiana Haldane-Duncan; 24 January 1840; Naples, Kingdom of the Two Sicilies
- Died: 8 December 1915 (aged 75); Camperdown, Dundee, Scotland
- Spouse: George Abercromby, 4th Baron Abercromby (m. 1858)
- Parents: Adam Haldane-Duncan, 2nd Earl of Camperdown; Juliana Cavendish Philips

Julia Janet Georgiana Abercromby, Baroness Abercromby (née Haldane-Duncan; 24 January 1840 – 8 December 1915) was a British courtier, noblewoman, and artist.

== Life ==
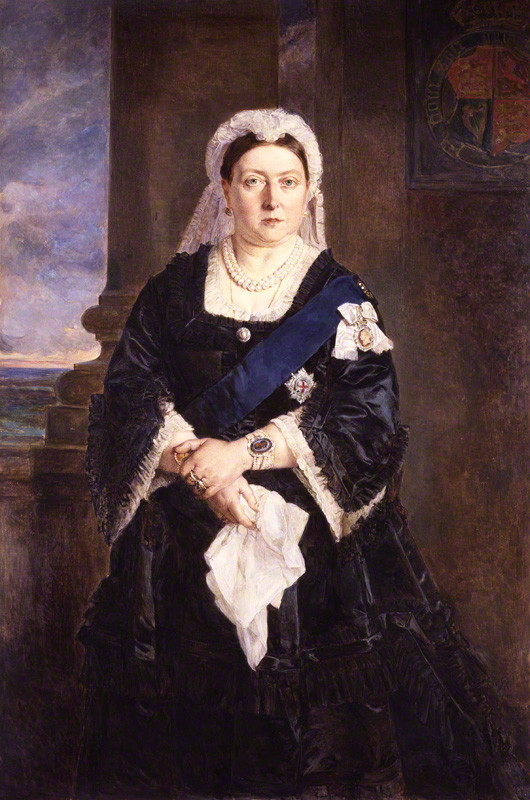
The first "National Portrait" of Queen Victoria was a watercolour by Abercromby

The Hon. Julia Janet Georgiana Haldane-Duncan was born on 24 January 1840 in Naples. Her father was Adam Haldane-Duncan, Viscount Duncan, subsequently Earl of Camperdown, and her mother was Juliana Cavendish Philips, daughter of Sir George Richard Philips, Bt. On 6 October 1858, she married George, 4th Baron Abercromby.

Lady Abercromby was a Lady of the Bedchamber to Queen Victoria from April 1874 until March 1885. For her service to the Queen she was awarded The Royal Order of Victoria and Albert, Third Class. Whilst she was a lady-in-waiting she had the honour of painting the first official portrait of the Queen for the National Portrait Gallery. The gallery had requested paintings in 1867 of the Queen and her consort, Prince Albert. A portrait of Albert was sent almost immediately but it was not until 1883 that Abercromby's portrait of the Queen was sent. The picture was created in watercolour and was actually based on an original work by Heinrich von Angeli. The Queen's preference for this portrait is said to be because it does not emphasise the Queen's regalia but the woman behind the power.

Lady Abercromby read A Princess of Thule by William Black to Queen Victoria in Autumn 1874. The queen commissioned a watercolor of the protagonist Sheila Mackenzie. The image was published by consent of Queen Elizabeth II for the first time in The Maid of Arran by L. Frank Baum, edited by Marcus D. Mébes. Shreveport: Pumpernickel Pickle, 2021, page 156.

She exhibited at the Royal Academy in 1898. Her portrait on Benjamin Jowett was thought to very close to life and the letters from Jowett indicate a close friendship, although Jowett was a friend of her brother Robert Haldane-Duncan, 3rd Earl of Camperdown.

Lady Abercromby died on 8 December 1915 leaving a widower but no children.

== Legacy ==
Abercromby has paintings in British national collections including the National Portrait Gallery, Balliol College, Oxford and the Britannia Royal Naval College.
