= Jeremy (bear) =

Brown bear who lived at the Camperdown Wildlife Centre

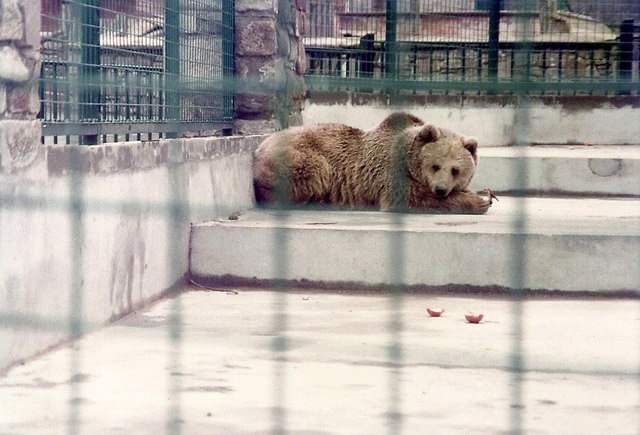
- Jeremy in April 1985
- Species: Eurasian brown bear
- Sex: Female
- Born: c. 1966
- Died: 1991 (aged 24–25); Dundee, Scotland
- Residence: Camperdown Wildlife Centre

Jeremy was a captive female Eurasian brown bear who lived at the Camperdown Wildlife Centre in Dundee, Scotland.

== Life ==
Jeremy starred in Sugar Puffs adverts in the 1960s before the cereal brand replaced her with a cartoon version of herself. She briefly lived at Cromer Zoo in Norfolk where she was notably visited by future Rector of the University of Dundee Stephen Fry when he was a child. Fry wrote in The Fry Chronicles that Jeremy was the first celebrity he ever saw in person. Jeremy was later moved to Camperdown Wildlife Centre in Dundee, where she became the centre's main attraction. In July 1974, she was moved from a cage to a bear pit.

Jeremy made headlines when she bit 10-year-old Ross Prendergast from Ardler in 1986. The boy, who had entered the centre after closing time with his brother, Mark, and a group of friends, was injured after placing his hand through the bars of the enclosure. His arm was severed at the elbow, and he sustained severe injuries to his chest and shoulders. Dundee Royal Infirmary reported that Prendergast was in satisfactory condition. The centre's conservation officer George Reid stated that it was the first time that Jeremy had been involved in an incident and that she was "not normally aggressive".

Jeremy lived at the centre until her death in 1991, when she was euthanised for medical reasons at the age of 25.
