= Lord Duncan (1798 Liverpool ship) =

History

Great Britain
- Name: Lord Duncan
- Namesake: Adam Duncan, 1st Viscount Duncan
- Owner: Samuel MacDowell (or McDowal) & Co.
- Fate: Condemned 1800

General characteristics
- Tons burthen: 101, or 118 (bm)

Lord Duncan was launched at Dublin in 1787 under another name. Between 1799 and 1800 she made one voyage as a slave ship in the triangular trade in enslaved people. She was sold in 1800 after she had delivered her captives.

== Career ==
Lord Duncan first appeared in Lloyd's Register (LR) in 1798.

Year	Master	Owner	Trade	Source
1799	C.King	J.Bold	Liverpool–Africa	LR

Captain Charles King sailed from Liverpool on 7 March 1799. King had been a surgeon on voyages transporting enslaved people between 1785 and 1799, but this was his first voyage as a master. In 1799, 156 vessels sailed from English ports, bound for the trade in enslaved people; 134 of these vessels sailed from Liverpool.

Lord Duncan stopped at Sierra Leone and she arrived at Kingston, Jamaica on 2 February 1800, with 127 captives acquired at the Congo River. Before reaching Kingston she had stopped at Martinique. She had left Liverpool with 23 crew members and had suffered three crew deaths on her voyage.

Although the registers carried Lord Duncan for some more years with unchanged data, her owners had sold her in the Americas after she had delivered her captives.
