= Clan Haldane =

Lowland Scottish clan

- Crest: An eagle's head erased Or
- Motto: Suffer

Chief
- Martin Haldane of Gleneagles
- 26th Baron of Gleneagles, Chief of the Name and Arms of Haldane
- Seat: Gleneagles House
- Historic seat: Gleneagles House & Airthrey Castle
Rival clans
Clan Stewart

Clan Haldane is a Lowland Scottish clan.

== History ==
=== Origins of the clan ===
Bernard, son of Brien, received from William the Lion the manor of Hauden between 1165 and 1171. A cadet of the house is believed to have settled in Strathearn and acquired lands which later became part of the barony of Gleneagles, where the chiefs of Clan Haldane still reside today. The name Gleneagles has nothing to do with the chief's heraldry but is derived from the Scottish Gaelic, glen and eaglais, which means a church.

=== Wars of Scottish Independence ===
In 1296 Aylmer Haldane appears in the Ragman Rolls swearing fealty to Edward I of England. However he soon allied himself with Robert the Bruce in the struggle for Scottish independence. In 1312 Sir Simon Haldane received a charter for part of the lands of Bardrill in Streathearn from Sir John de Logy. Sir Simon married Matilda de Arnot and in doing so obtained extensive lands within the earldom of Lennox.

=== 15th century ===
Sir John Haldane, third of Gleneagles was Lord Justice General of Scotland beyond the Forth, sheriff principal of Edinburgh and Master of the Household under James III of Scotland. In 1482 he resigned his lands in Fife, Stirlingshire and Perthshire to the Crown, and as a result received a charter that erected them into the free barony of Gleneagles. He was married to a daughter of Murdoch Menteith of Rusky, through whom he claimed the earldom of Lennox. He began a lengthy lawsuit which resulted in Stuart, Lord Darnley retaining the earldom but Gleneagles was compensated with one quarter of the lands.

=== 16th century and clan conflicts ===
In 1505, Sir James Haldane, fourth of Gleneagles was appointed Governor of Dunbar Castle. In 1508, his son, Sir John Haldane, fifth of Gleneagles, married Marjorie Lawson (died 1533), a daughter of the Provost of Edinburgh, Richard Lawson of High Riggs. John Haldane was responsible for erecting lands in Lennox and Perthshire that were not already part of Gleneagles into the barony of Haldane. The seat was then at Rusky House in Menteith. He was killed at the Battle of Flodden in 1513. After John Haldane's death, Margaret Lawson, Lady Gleneagles, formed a relationship with William Meldrum which led to conflict, and was described by Robert Lindsay of Pitscottie, and by David Lyndsay in his poem Squyer Meldrum.

In 1560 Robert Haldane, laird of Gleneagles, and his brother John, were at the Siege of Leith in support of the Scottish Reformation. Embracing the reformation, the Haldanes played a prominent part in the political upheavals that removed Mary, Queen of Scots. The Haldanes were part of a force that laid siege to Stirling Castle in 1585. They were attempting to persuade the king to rescind the banishment on the Earl of Angus and other unruly Protestant nobles. James Haldane, brother of the Laird of Gleneagles, led an attack on the west port of the castle. He engaged Sir William Stewart, colonel of the Royal Guard and drove him back. However Haldane was shot while on the point of victory by Stewart's servant.

=== 17th century and Civil War ===
Sir John Haldane, eleventh Laird of Gleneagles was a professional soldier who fought for Henry, Prince of Orange, along with his brother, James Haldane in the Netherlands. He was knighted by Charles I of England in 1633 and represented Perth in Parliament. He was a strong supporter of the National Covenant and his estates became burdened with debts as a result of raising men and supplies. He is credited with building the present House of Gleneagles and fought for the royalist army, leading his regiment against Parliament at the Battle of Dunbar (1650).

=== 18th century and Jacobite risings ===
General George Haldane, son of the sixteenth Laird was a professional soldier who fought against the French at the Battle of Dettingen in 1743 and the Battle of Fontenoy in 1745. George Haldane also served under the Duke of Cumberland against the Jacobites in the campaign of 1745 - 1746.

=== 19th to 20th Century ===
In 1820 the estates passed to a cousin of the eighteenth Haldane of Gleneagles, Admiral Adam Duncan, Viscount Duncan of Camperdown, who was renowned for his victory at the Battle of Camperdown in 1797. The Admiral's son assumed the surname of Haldane and was raised to the title of Earl of Camperdown in 1831.

The fourth Earl of Camperdown resigned his estates to his kinsman, James Chinnery-Haldane in 1918. James's son, Alexander, succeeded as clan chief. Another of his sons, Brodick, was a renowned portrait photographer. Alexander died in 1994 and the chiefship passed to his nephew Martin.

== Clan Chief ==
The current chief of Clan Haldane is Martin Haldane of Gleneagles, 26th Baron of Gleneagles.

== See also ==
- Scottish clan
