= Lord Duncan (1798 slave ship) =

History

Great Britain
- Name: Lord Duncan
- Namesake: Adam Duncan, 1st Viscount Duncan
- Owner: Samuel MacDowell (or McDowal) & Co.
- Fate: Condemned 1800

General characteristics
- Tons burthen: 145 (bm)

Lord Duncan was a slave ship whose origins are obscure. She made one voyage in 1798–1799 in the triangular trade in enslaved people. She was condemned at Jamaica in 1800 after having delivered her captives.

Captain John Hodgson (or Hudson), sailed from Liverpool on 5 December 1798, bound for the Bight of Benin. In 1798, 160 vessels sailed from English ports, bound for the trade in enslaved people; 149 of these vessels sailed from Liverpool. She was authorized to carry 242 captives.

Lord Duncan arrived at Kingston on 20 November 1799 with 194 captives. Captain Hodgson died on 11 December. Captain Alexander Cowan replaced him. Lord Duncan had left Liverpool with 21 crew members and had suffered two crew deaths on her voyage.

Lord Duncan sailed from Jamaica, bound for Liverpool, but had to put back and was condemned.
