= George Haldane-Duncan, 4th Earl of Camperdown =

British peer (1845-1933)

Coat of arms of the Earl of Camperdown

George Alexander Philips Haldane Haldane-Duncan (9 May 1845 − 5 December 1933) was a Scottish peer, the fourth and last Earl of Camperdown.

== Early life ==
He was a younger son of MP Adam Haldane-Duncan, 2nd Earl of Camperdown and former Juliana Cavendish (née Philips), Countess of Camperdown (the eldest daughter and co-heiress of Sir George Richard Philips, Bt.). Among his siblings were Robert Haldane-Duncan, 3rd Earl of Camperdown and Lady Julia Duncan (wife of George Abercromby, 4th Baron Abercromby).

== Career ==
Duncan worked for the British firm Maudslay, Sons and Field, which made engines for ships in the Royal Navy, the Italian Navy, and the White Star Line.

In 1918, Duncan inherited the earldom when his older brother, the 3rd Earl, died. Although Duncan took the title, he declined the associated inheritance. Due to his involvement with charities in the Boston area, Duncan did not want to move back to the United Kingdom. Instead, he arranged for the inheritance to go to younger members of his British family.

== Personal life ==
In 1888, Duncan married Mrs. Laura Blanchard (née Dove), an American from Boston, Massachusetts, daughter of industrialist John Dove, of Andover, Massachusetts. The couple lived in Boston for the rest of their lives, with trips to the United Kingdom every two years. Blanchard died in 1910.

Duncan died in Boston on December 5, 1933, after a long illness.

Peerage of the United Kingdom
Preceded by Robert Haldane-Duncan	Earl of Camperdown; 1918–1933	Extinct
