= Admiral Duncan (ship) =

Several vessels have been named Admiral Duncan for Admiral Lord Adam Duncan:

- Admiral Duncan was launched at Shields in 1798. She traded between Britain and North American until she was burnt in 1800.
- Admiral Duncan was an armed schooner that the colonial government of Bermuda in 1799 hired to patrol the Turks and Caicos Islands. She was reportedly armed with ten "Double Three Pounders" and two 6-pounder chase guns, and had a crew of 30 men, well-supplied with small arms.
- Admiral Duncan was a schooner whose master, John Marett, acquired a letter of marque in Great Britain on 19 December 1799. She had a burthen of 113 tons, was armed with six 4&9-pounder guns, and had a crew of 18 men.

== See also ==
- HMS Duncan
- Lord Duncan (ship)
