= Camperdown, Dundee =

Area of Dundee, Scotland

Coordinates: 56.483809°N 3.044031°W

Camperdown
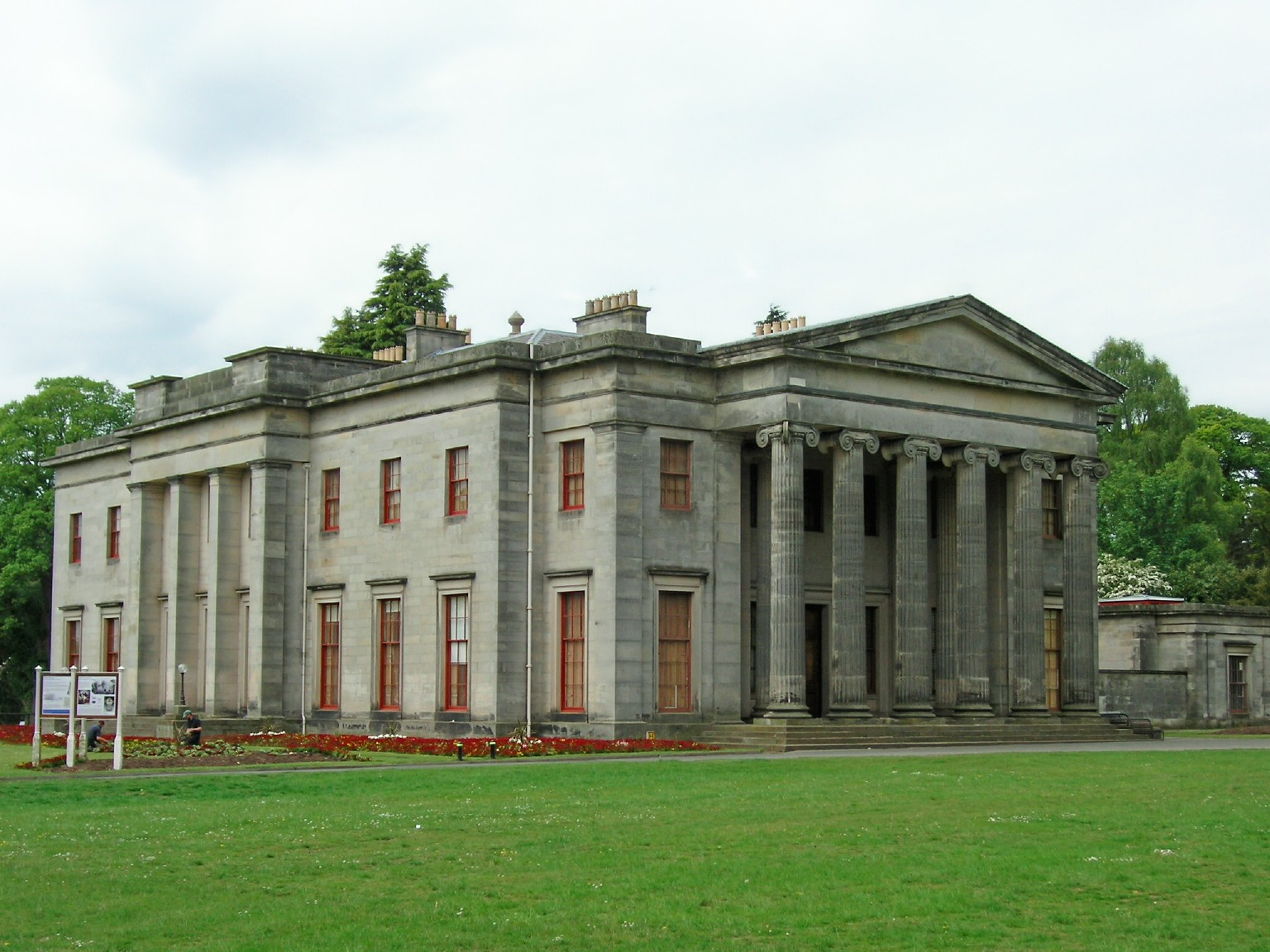
- Camperdown House

- Location within Dundee City council area Location within Scotland
- OS grid reference: NO358329
- Council area: Dundee City
- Lieutenancy area: Dundee
- Country: Scotland
- Sovereign state: United Kingdom
- Post town: DUNDEE
- Postcode district: DD2
- Dialling code: 01382
- Police: Scotland
- Fire: Scottish
- Ambulance: Scottish
- UK Parliament: Dundee West
- Scottish Parliament: Dundee City West

Camperdown is an area of Dundee, Scotland, best known for Camperdown Park, which is the largest park in the city.

The name is an anglicisation of Camperduin, the name of a village on the coast of Holland. Adam Duncan, a native of Dundee, won a naval victory at Camperduin in 1797. When he returned to Scotland, he built a home for himself named Camperdown House, which later gave its name to the area.

The Dundee Ice Arena is located in the area, on the north side of the Kingsway (A90) ring road. If completed according to 2022 plans (revised in 2023), Dundee F.C.'s new stadium to replace Dens Park would also be sited there.

== Camperdown Country Park ==
Camperdown Country Park, often known as just Camperdown Park, is a public park in the Camperdown area of Dundee. The park is the location of Camperdown House, a wildlife centre and many other recreational facilities. It is the largest park in Dundee, stretching to 400 acres (1.6 km^{2}). Over 190 species of tree are found in the park. It is located three miles north-west of Dundee city centre.
