= Robert Haldane-Duncan, 3rd Earl of Camperdown =

British politician (1841-1918)

The Right Honourable The Earl of Camperdown
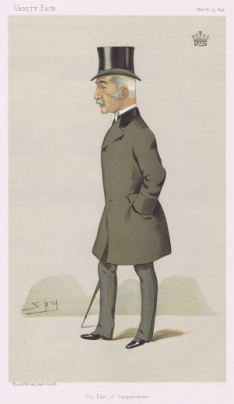
- The Earl of Camperdown as caricatured by Spy (Leslie Ward) in Vanity Fair, March 1895

Civil Lord of the Admiralty
- In office 1870–1874
- Preceded by: Sir George Trevelyan
- Succeeded by: Sir Massey Lopes

Personal details
- Born: Robert Adam Philips Haldane Haldane-Duncan; 28 May 1841
- Died: 5 June 1918 (aged 77)
- Relations: George Haldane-Duncan, 4th Earl of Camperdown (brother)
- Parent(s): Adam Haldane-Duncan, 2nd Earl of Camperdown; Juliana Cavendish Philips
- Education: Eton College
- Alma mater: Balliol College, Oxford

Robert Adam Philips Haldane Haldane-Duncan, 3rd Earl of Camperdown (28 May 1841 – 5 June 1918), styled Viscount Duncan from 1859 to 1867, was a British Liberal politician.

== Early life ==
Camperdown was the eldest son of Adam Haldane-Duncan, 2nd Earl of Camperdown, and his wife Juliana Cavendish (née Philips). His father served as MP for Southampton, Bath, and Forfarshire. His sister was Julia Janet Georgiana Haldane-Duncan, a notable artist and Lady of the Bedchamber to Queen Victoria who married George Abercromby, 4th Baron Abercromby. His younger brother was George Haldane-Duncan, 4th Earl of Camperdown.

He was educated at Eton and Balliol College, Oxford.

== Career ==
He succeeded his father in the earldom in 1867 and took his seat on the Liberal benches in the House of Lords. The following year he was appointed a Lord-in-waiting (government whip in the House of Lords) in William Ewart Gladstone's first administration, a post he held until 1870, and then served as a Civil Lord of the Admiralty from 1870 to 1874.

Lord Camperdown received an honorary doctorate (LL.D.) from the University of St Andrews in February 1902. The previous year he had become President of University College, Dundee, then a college of St Andrews. He remained president of the college until his death.

== Personal life ==
Lord Camperdown died in June 1918, aged 77. He never married and was succeeded in the earldom by his younger brother George.

Political offices
Preceded by Sir George Trevelyan	Civil Lord of the Admiralty; 1870–1874	Succeeded by Sir Massey Lopes
Peerage of the United Kingdom
Preceded by Adam Haldane-Duncan	Earl of Camperdown; 1867–1918	Succeeded by George Haldane-Duncan
