= Baron of Lundie =

Scottish Crown barony created in 1489

Baron of Lundie is a nobility title in the Baronage of Scotland.

The crown barony was created by King David II for John Iles, granting him the lands and title of the Baron of Lundie. In June 1489 King James IV confirmed to Andrew, Lord Gray, the lands and Barony of Lundie. A notable holder of the Barony title was Admiral Adam Duncan who led the British fleet to victory against the combined Dutch and French fleet at the Battle of Camperdown in 1797.

The current owner of the title is Craig Ward.

== Lundie ==
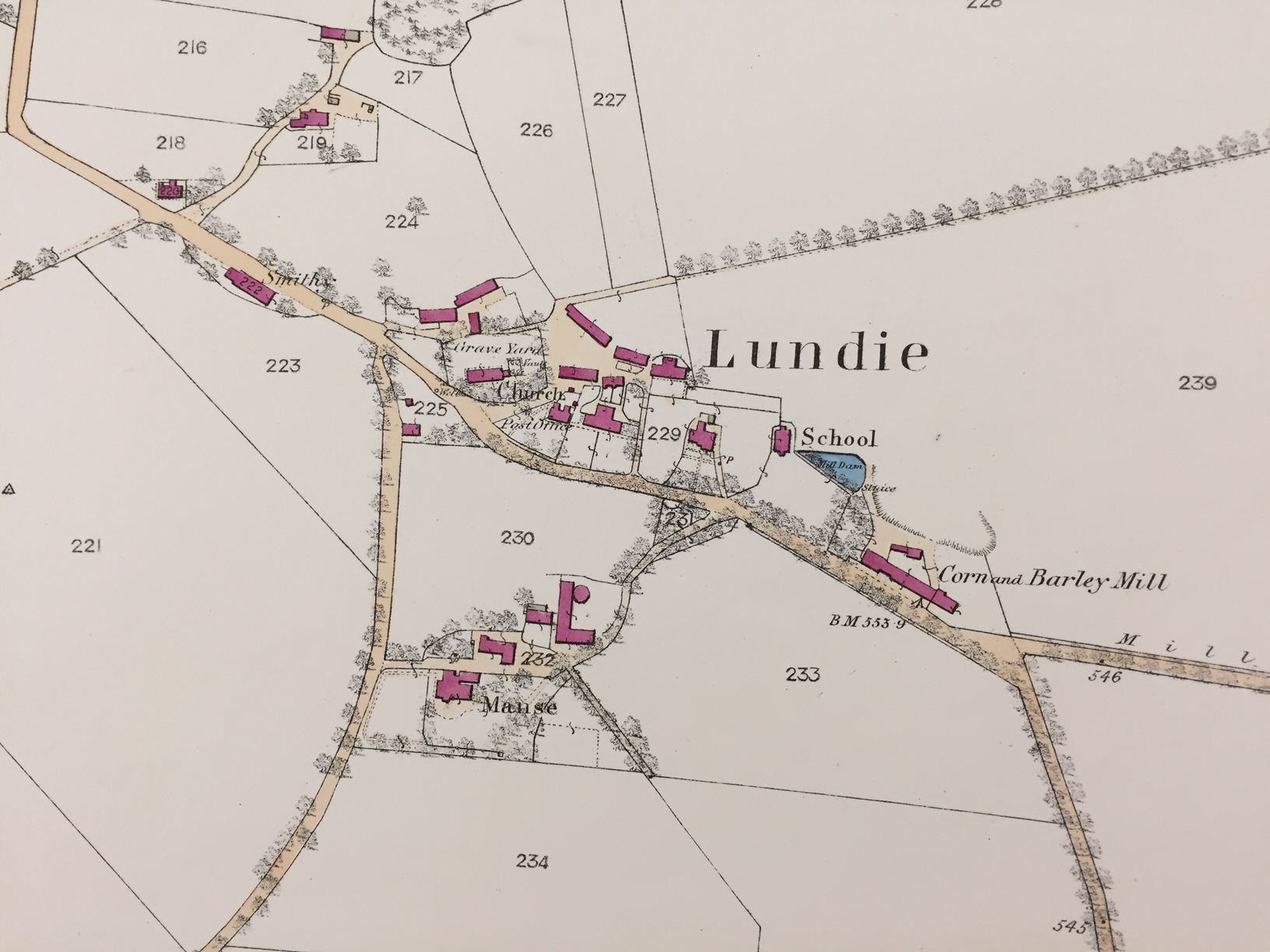
Map of Lundie (1863). 25.344 inches to one mile. NO 2901 3662 • X/Y co-ods: 329016, 736620 • Lat/Log: 56.51,-3.15. Height: 178.2m. .

Lundie is a small village in Angus, Scotland at the head of the Dighty valley in the Sidlaws, north west of Dundee in Scotland. It is surrounded by several lochs and hills. The area is known for its beautiful walks around the local hills of Lundie Craigs. The name 'Lundie' is Gaelic in origin and may be derived from 'Linn dhu' meaning the 'black pool' or from 'Linn de' meaning the 'pool of God'.

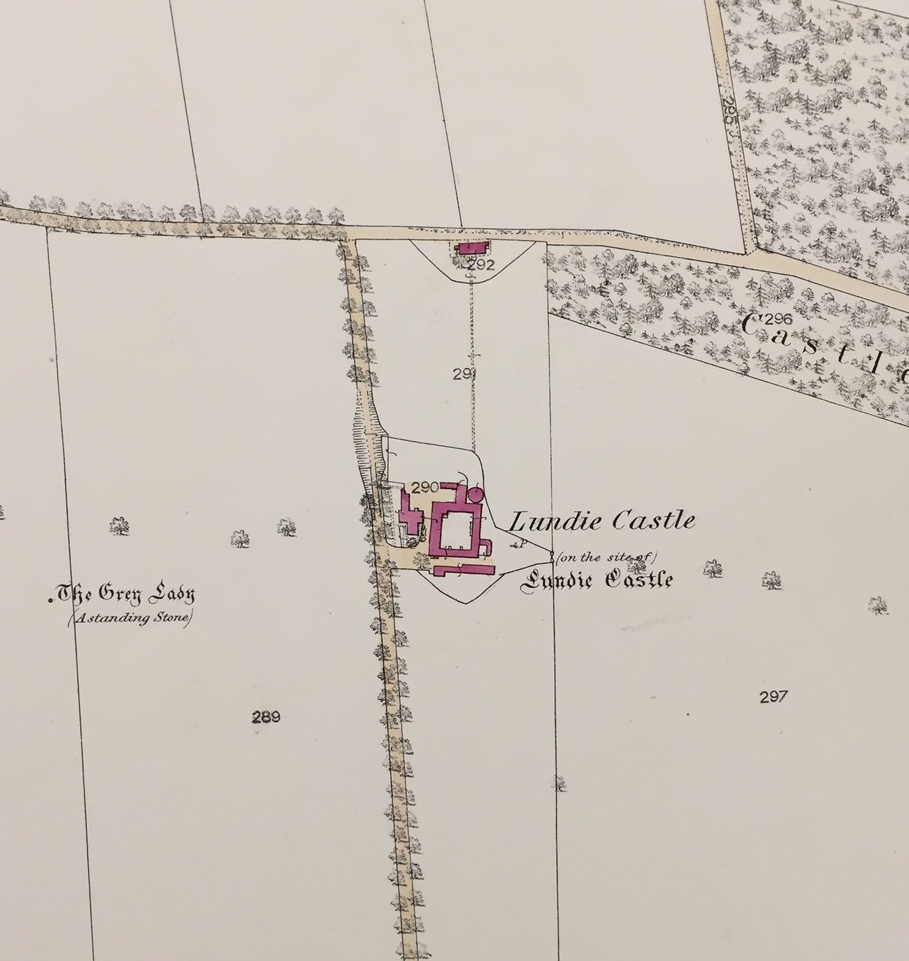
Lundie Castle was built a little before 1539 and had become ruins by 1823. It was a large square tower around 30 feet high (Carrie J (1881) Ancient Things in Angus: a series of articles on ancient things, manners and customs in Forfarshire. Arbroath:Thomas Buncle Publishers). NO33NW 13 30899 36122.(1863) scale: 25.344 inches to one mile.

== History of the Barony of Lundie ==
=== 1300 to 1500 ===
The Barony of Lundie is a medieval Barony dating from c. 1330AD - c. 1370AD. During the reign of King David II (1329-1371) John Iles held the Baron of Lundie. By the time of King Robert III (1390-1406) the tile was held by a Robert Lyall.

In June 1489, King James IV granted Andrew, Lord Gray the lands and Barony of Lundie which had been forfeited by Robert, 2nd Lord Lyall. During the reign of King James III of Scotland, Lord Lyall had been a Privy Councillor and an ambassador to England. In 1488 was appointed as the Great Judiciary of Scotland. He joined however a group of nobles seeking to revenge the murder of James III and was considered to be a rebel, hence the forfeiture. By 6 May 1495, the Lyalls had regained royal favour and King James IV granted Robert Lyall, son and heir apparent of Robert, Lord Lyall, the lands and Barony of Lundie.

=== 1500 to 1600 ===
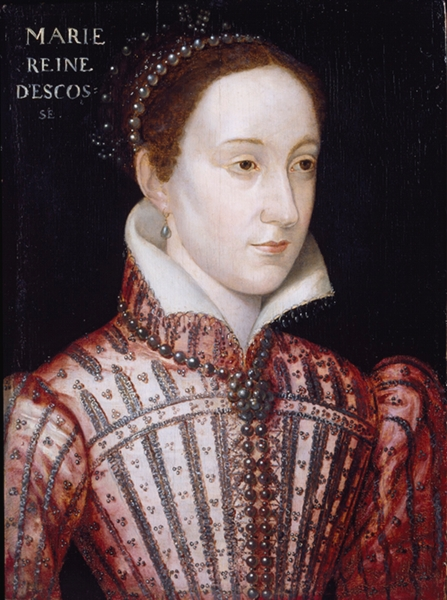
Mary, Queen of Scots

The income of the barony of Lundie was lost by the Lyalls on 9 May 1512 when King James IV granted Grissel Beaton, daughter of John Beaton of Creich, the life rent of the lands and Barony of Lundie.

John, Lord Lyall, transferred the lands and Barony of Lundie, with its mill, castle, and manor to Sir John Campbell and his spouse Isobel Gray, in 1539. This was confirmed by Mary, Queen of Scots, on 12 October 1545. He was High Treasurer of Scotland in the reign of James V. It is believed that he was instrumental in restructuring the castle at Lundie.

On 28 May 1583, King James VI granted Colin Campbell, Earl of Argyll and his wife Agnes Keith, Countess of Moray, the lands and Barony of Lundie, which James Campbell of Lundie had resigned.

James VI confirmed a charter of Colin Campbell, Baron of Lundie, granting his wife Mary Campbell, Countess of Menteith, various lands lying in the Barony of Lundie, on 3 August 1614. Colin Campbell was created a baronet of Nova Scotia on 13 December 1627, this title descended to his son and eventually to the Dukes of Argyll. Sir Colin Campbell of Lundie married secondly to Jean Stirling and they are mentioned in a charter dated 10 July 1630 and in several sasines dating from 1631. After Colin Campbell's death, in 1634 King Charles I granted Archibald Campbell, Lord Lorne, the land and Barony of Lundie.

Archibald was only the Baron of Lundie briefly as the following year he resigned it to the Crown and it was then granted to James Campbell, Lord of Kintyre.

The Wars of the Three Kingdoms (1638-1651) saw Campbell of Lundie as a cavalry officer taking an active role. On 28 March 1642, King Charles I created James, Lord Kintyre, second son of Archibald, Earl of Argyll, as the Earl of Irvine and Lord of Lundie.

Following the execution of King Charles I Lundie supported the claim of his son. In the Battle of Dunbar (1650) he led a troop of sixty cavalrymen against Oliver Cromwell's Parliamentary Army. During the period of the Commonwealth period the lands of Lundie appear forfeited, returned later to the Campbells after the monarchy's restoration.

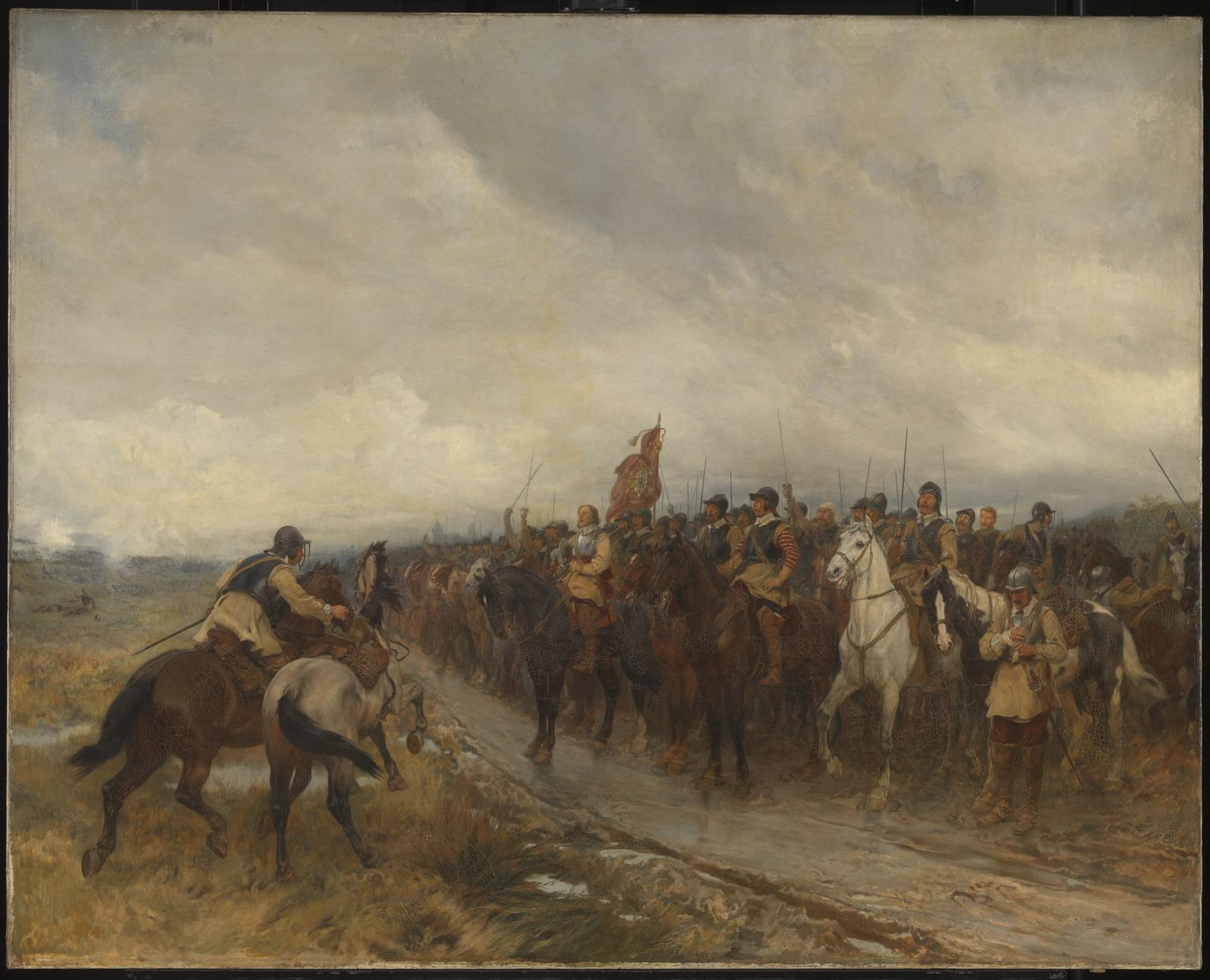
Cromwell at Dunbar by Andrew Carrick Gow

On 20 July 1663 the Barony of Lundie of Forfarshire was granted to Colin Campbell eldest son of George Campbell of Carsgownie [SIG1.22.128]. Following the death of Colin Campbell, Baron of Lundie his lands and title were succeeded by his son also called Colin on the on 23 April 1674. Colin Campbell, Baron of Lundie was succeeded by a member of the Duncan family. The Duncan family were prominent merchants and burgesses of Dundee during the seventeenth and eighteenth centuries.

William Duncan of Seasyde was born in 1652[This date must be incorrect because Alexander Duncan, who married Anna Drummond in 1673, was baptised at Dundee in 1653.] . He was a leading merchant and burgess of Dundee and father of Alexander Duncan. His testament was confirmed with the Commissariot of Brechin 11 September 1678. His son Alexander Duncan was also a merchant and Provost in Dundee from 1681 to 1689. The lands and Barony of Lundie passed to him during the 1670s. On 31 July 1686 he and his wife Anna Drummond of Megginch were officially granted the Barony of Lundie. [NRS.SIG1.41.7] & [NRS.Rand S38.S3.V.352].

In 1696 Alexander Duncan, Baron of Lundie died. His wife, Ann Drummond died in 1693. The testaments of Alexander Duncan of Lundie were confirmed with the Commissariot of Brechin on 5 November 1696 and on 23 August 1707. Their son Alexander succeeded on the death of his father in 1696 to the Barony of Lundie. He too was a merchant burgess of Dundee and married to Isobel, daughter of Sir Patrick Murray of Auchtertyre. Alexander Duncan of Lundie in 1704 was granted the lands of Gourdie and the lands of Wester Keith in 1707. [RGS.80.92; 83.58].

=== 1700 to 1800 ===
During the Jacobite Rising of 1715, Alexander actively supported the Hanoverians. This resulted in him being appointed Deputy Constable of the burgh and Deputy Lieutenant of Forfarshire in 1715-1716 NRS.GD45.15.47. . Alexander Duncan, Baron of Lundie, died in Lundie Castle on 2 January 1719. He had two sons Alexander, who succeeded to Lundie, and William physician to King George II. In September 1723, Alexander Duncan succeeded his father as Baron of Lundie. He was also a merchant burgess and Provost of Dundee from 1717 to 1719. He married Helen, daughter of John Haldane of Gleneagles [NRS.RS35.XI.68].

Alexander Duncan and his wife Helen Haldane had two sons Alexander and Adam. Alexander, the elder son, succeeded to the lands and Barony of Lundie on his father's death in 1777. Alexander, the eldest son, was a British Army officer. On 6 August 1766, Alexander Duncan, a Lieutenant Colonel in the 55th Regiment of Foot was granted the lands of Dryburgh near Dundee [RGS.109.33].

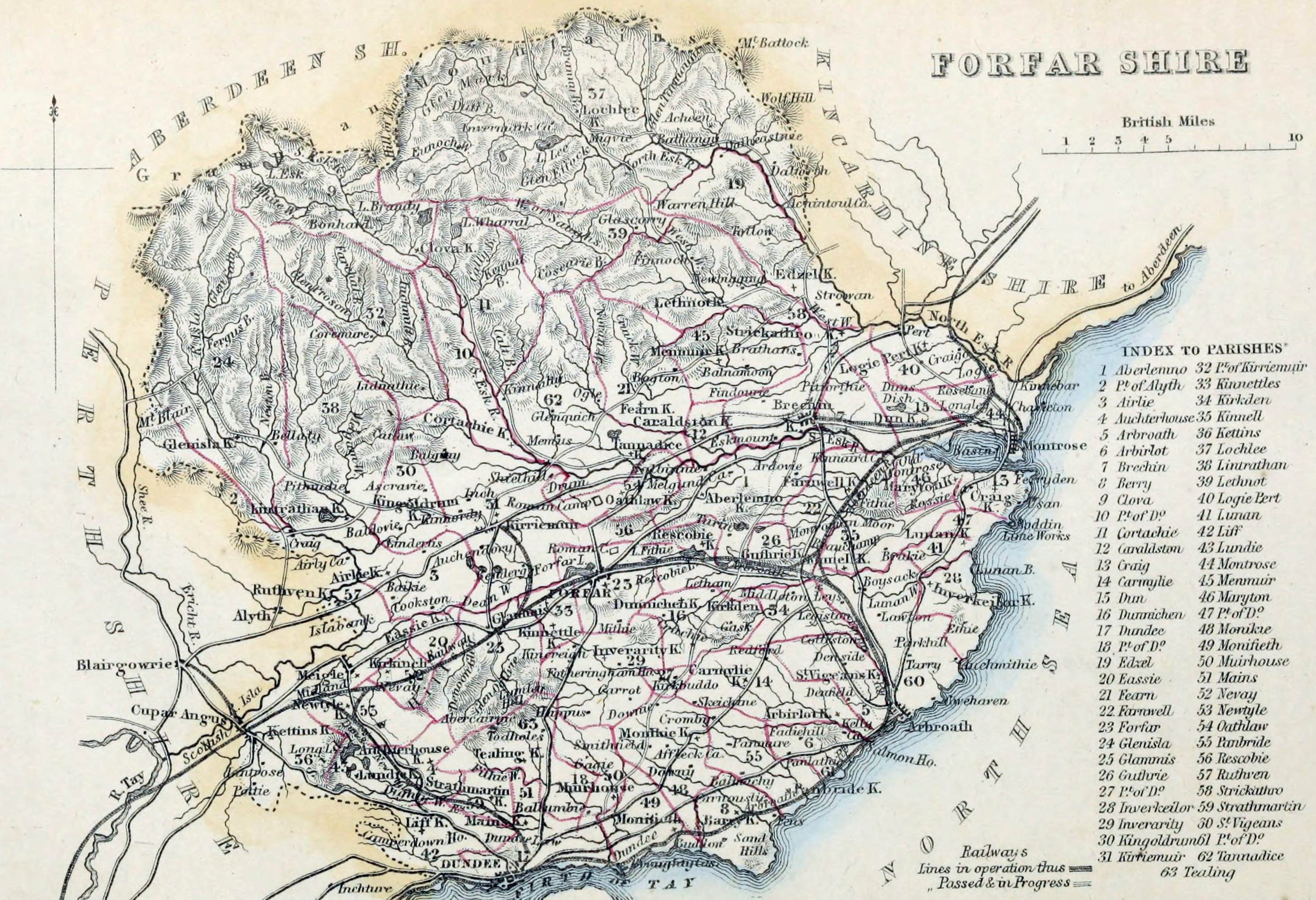
c.1854 Angusshire (Forfarshire) Civil Parish map.

Alexander fought in the British Army during the American War of Independence. In 1772 a signature of the lands of Lundie was granted to Lieutenant Colonel Alexander Duncan [SIG1.49.35][RGS.113.36]. Documents dated 1783 make reference to Lieutenant Colonel Alexander Duncan of Lundie in sasines. He died at Lundie on 31 August 1796 and his brother Admiral Adam Duncan (Royal Navy) succeeded to the estate of Lundie on 20 December 1796 [NRS.SIG2.35.226].

In 1797 Admiral Adam Duncan led the British fleet to victory against the combined Dutch and French fleet at the Battle of Camperdown (11 October 1797). He was created Baron Duncan of Lundie and Viscount Duncan of Camperdown. Admiral Duncan died in 1804 and was succeeded by his son Robert. [NRS.GD68.2.131].

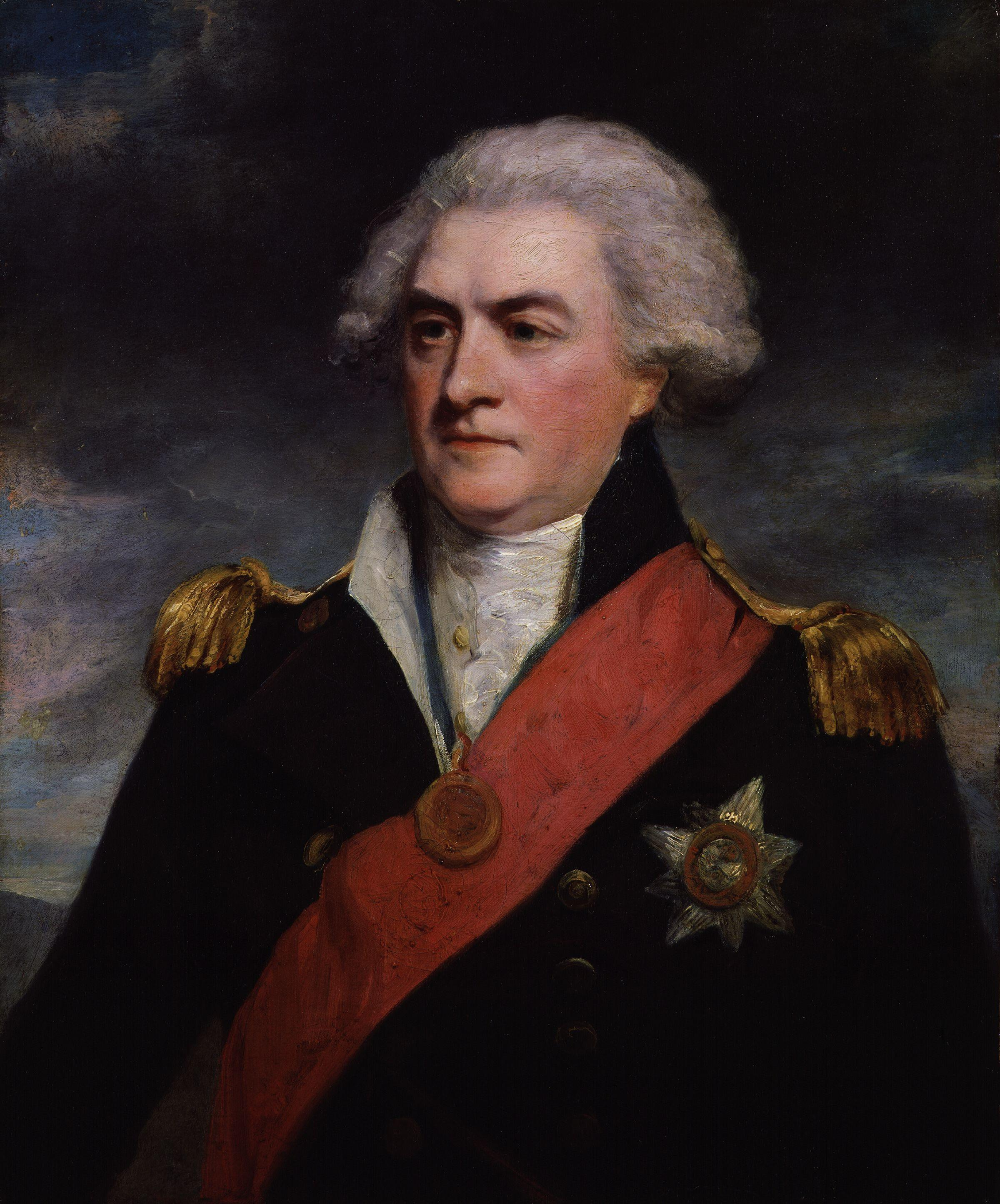
Adam Duncan, 1st Viscount Duncan

Viscount Robert Haldane Duncan of Lundie succeeded his uncle Alexander Duncan of Lundie in January 1812. In 1831 he was created 1st Earl Camperdown of Lundie. He died in 1859 and was succeeded by his son Adam.

Adam Haldane-Duncan, born 25 March 1812 in Edinburgh, was educated at Eton and at Trinity College, Cambridge. He married Juliana Cavendish Philips. Adam was a politician and a Member of Parliament from 1837 until 1854, on the death of his father he became the 2nd Earl of Camperdown, and from 1859 he was in the House of Lords where he served as a Junior Lord of the Treasury. Adam died on 30 January 1867 and was succeeded by his son Robert [RGS.132.62.64]

Robert Haldane-Duncan ( 3rd Earl Camperdown) was born on 28 May 1841 and was educated at Eton and Balliol College, Oxford. He too followed a political career as a Liberal and as a government whip during the Gladstone administration, also a Lord of the Admiralty. He was granted an honorary doctorate from the University of St Andrews and was President of University College, Dundee. On his death on 5 June 1918, as he was unmarried, the lands and titles went to his younger brother George [NRS.CS46.1889.11/46]. George Haldane-Duncan was born on 5 December 1845. In 1888 he married Louisa Dove Blanchard and settled in Boston, Massachusetts, where he died in 1933 aged 88.

=== From 1900 ===
George became the 4th Earl of Camperdown aged 73. As he had no children the house and estate passed to a cousin Georgina, Dowager Duchess of Buckinghamshire. She died in March 1937. In April 1952 to title of Barony of Lundie and lands came to Thomas Farrar of Camperdown.

=== The present Baron of Lundie ===
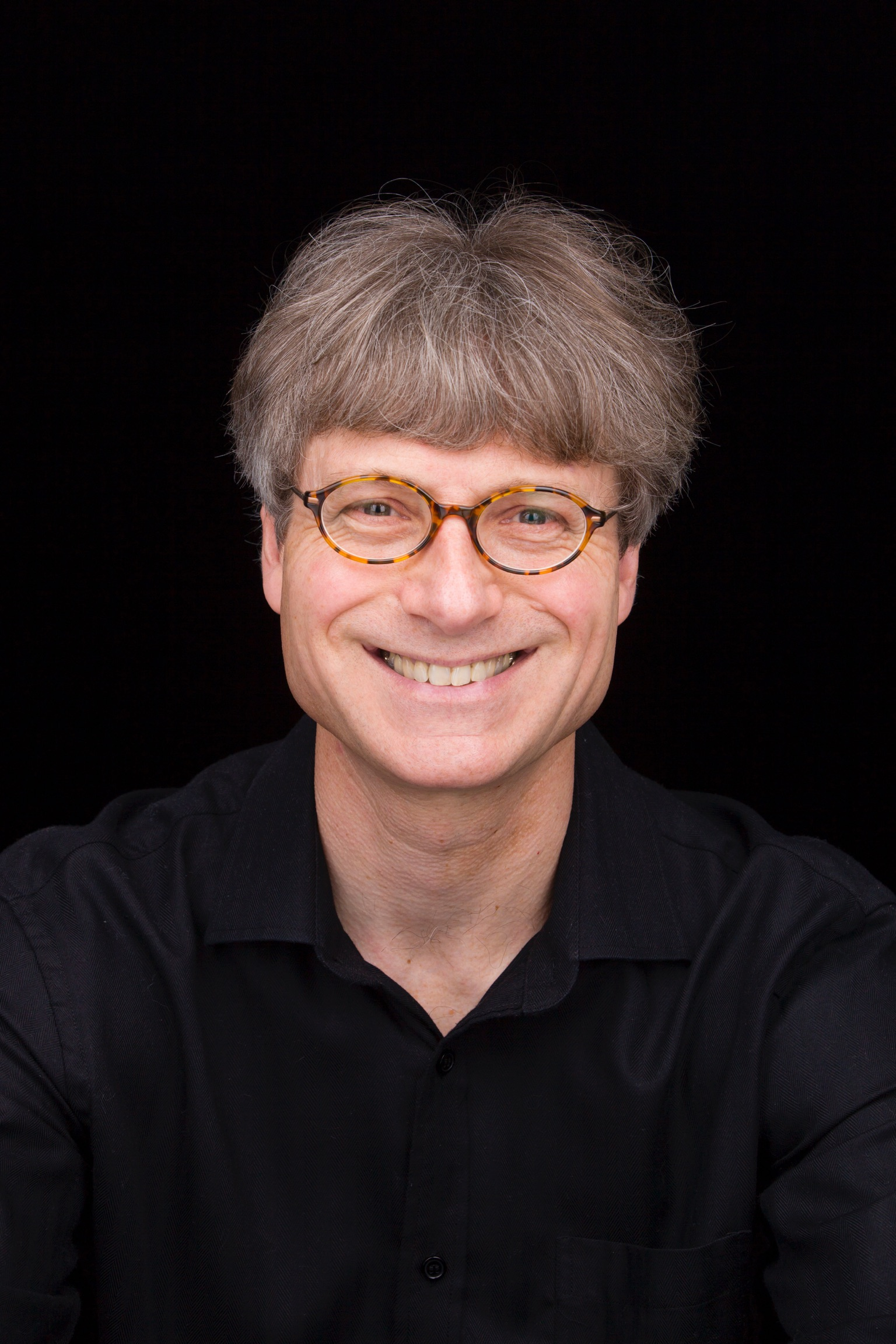
The Much Hon. Craig Ward, Baron of Lundie

The Barony title and rights passed in June 2017 to Craig Ward. He is a solicitor.
