= Earl of Camperdown =

Extinct earldom in the Peerage of the United Kingdom

Earldom of Camperdown
- Blazon: Arms: Quarterly: 1st and 4th grandquarters: Gules in chief two Cinquefoils and in base a Bugle Horn Argent stringed Azure, at centre point as an Honourable Augmentation, pendent by a Ribbon of the second and third from a Naval Crown Or a Gold Medal thereon two Figures the emblems of Victory and Britannia, Victory alighting on the Prow of an Antique Vessel crowning Britannia with a Wreath of Laurel and below the Gold Medal the word "Camperdown" (Duncan); 2nd and 3rd grandquarters: counter-quartered i and iv, Argent a Saltire engrailed Sable (Haldane); ii, Argent a Saltire between four Roses Gules (Lennox); iii, Or a bend chequy Sable and Argent (Menteith); in the centre a Crescent Azure for difference (all for Haldane of Gleneagles).; Crests: 1st: On the Waves of the Sea a Dismasted Ship proper (Duncan); 2nd: An Eagle's Head proper (Haldane).; Supporters: Dexter: An Angel crowned with a Celestial Crown a Scarf across her garments proper resting her exterior hand upon an Anchor the other holding a Palm Branch Or; Sinister: A Sailor holding in his exterior hand the Union Flag with the French Tricolour Flag wrapped round the staff all proper
- Creation date: 12 September 1831
- Created by: King William IV
- Peerage: Peerage of the United Kingdom
- First holder: Robert Dundas Haldane-Duncan, 1st Earl of Camperdown
- Last holder: George Alexander Philips Haldane Haldane-Duncan, 4th Earl of Camperdown
- Subsidiary titles: Viscount Duncan
- Status: Extinct
- Extinction date: 5 December 1933
- Motto: Above the 1st crest: DISCE PATI (learn to suffer); Above the 2nd crest: SUFFER; Below the shield: SECUNDIS DUBIISQUE RECTUS (Firm in every fortune).

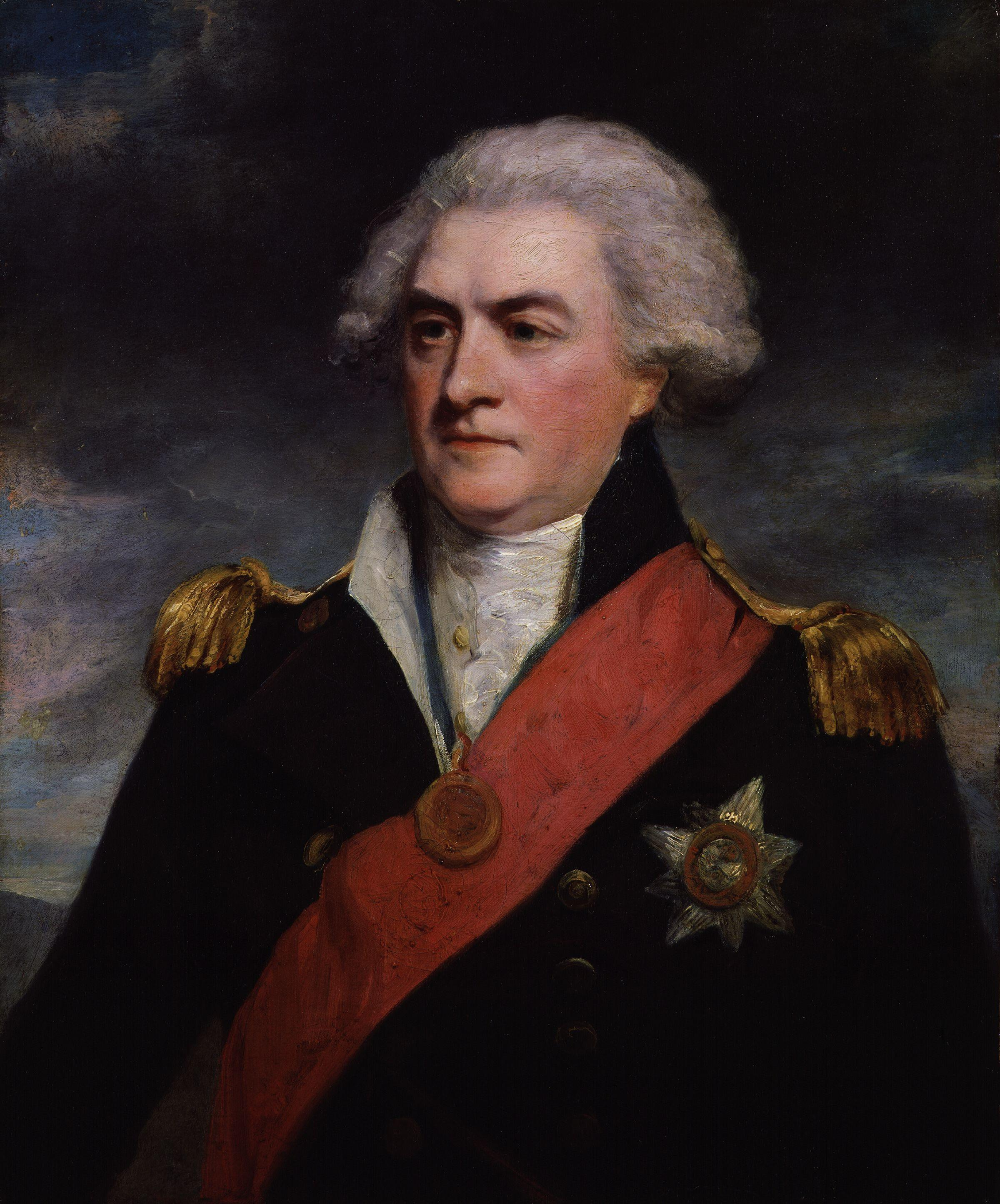
Adam Duncan, 1st Viscount Duncan

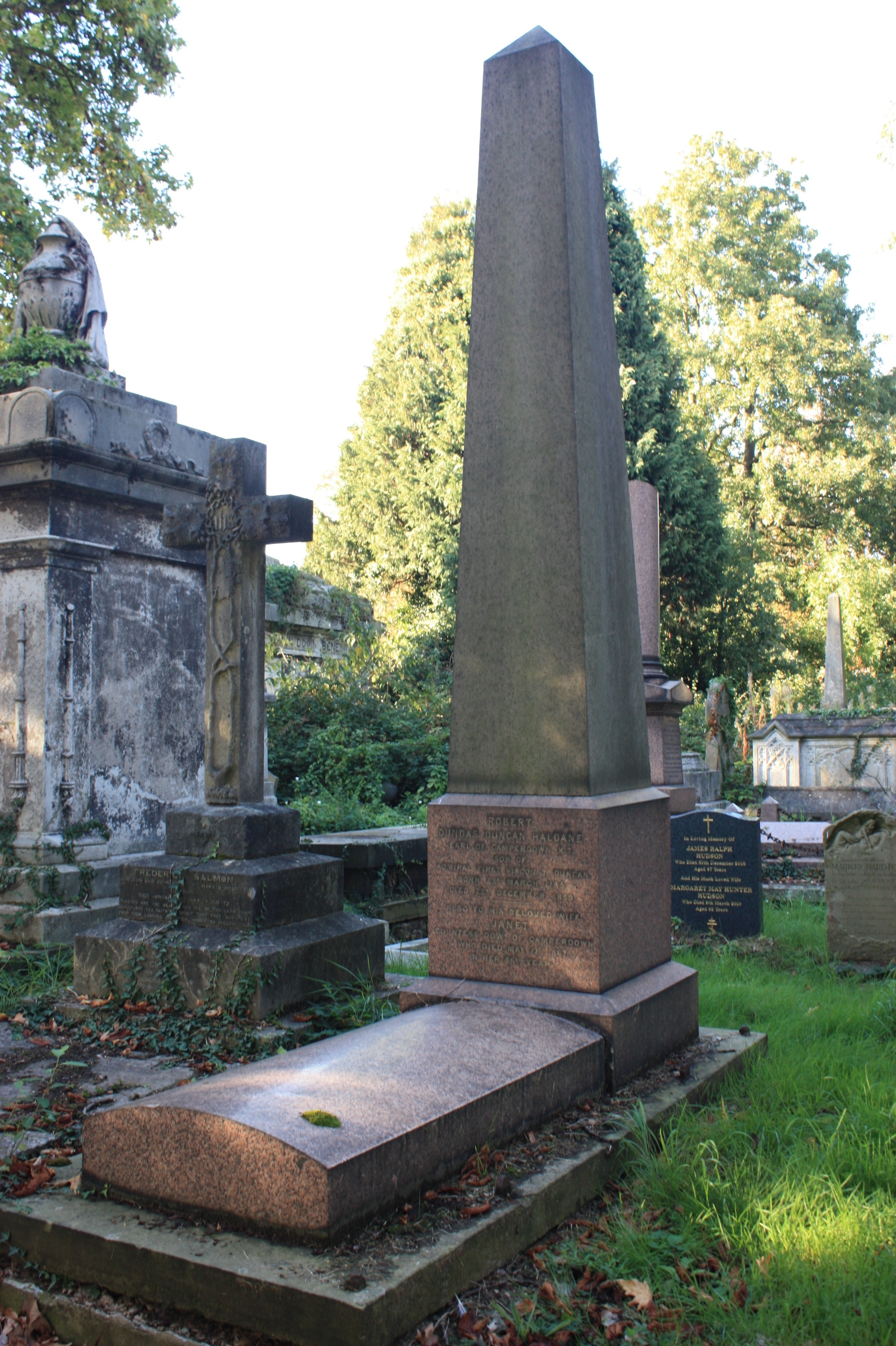
The grave of Robert Dundas Duncan Haldane (sometimes written Haldane-Duncan), on the north side of the main path, towards the central chapel, Kensal Green Cemetery, London

Earl of Camperdown (Camperduin), of Lundie in the County of Forfar and of Gleneagles in the County of Perth, was a title in the Peerage of the United Kingdom. It was created in 1831 for Robert Haldane-Duncan, 2nd Viscount Duncan. He was the son of the noted naval commander Admiral Adam Duncan, Baron of Lundie who was Commander-in-Chief of the North Sea from 1795 to 1801 and defeated a Franco-Dutch fleet at the Battle of Camperdown in October 1797. Later the same month he was honoured when he was raised to the Peerage of Great Britain as Baron Duncan, of Lundie in the Shire of Perth, and Viscount Duncan, of Camperdown and of Lundie in Our Shire of Perth. The first Earl was succeeded by his son, the second Earl. He was a Liberal politician and held minor office under Lord Palmerston from 1855 to 1858. Lord Camperdown assumed the additional surname of Haldane, which was the maiden name of his paternal grandmother. On his early death the titles passed to his eldest son, the third Earl. He was also a Liberal politician and served under William Ewart Gladstone as a Lord of the Admiralty from 1870 to 1874. He never married and was succeeded by his younger brother, the fourth Earl. He emigrated to Boston, Massachusetts, where he also died. Lord Camperdown was childless and on his death in 1933 all his titles became extinct.

William Duncan, uncle of the first Viscount, was created a baronet in 1764 (see Duncan baronets).

== Viscounts Duncan (1797) ==
- Adam Duncan, 1st Viscount Duncan (1731–1804)
- Robert Dundas Haldane-Duncan, 2nd Viscount Duncan (1785–1859) (created Earl of Camperdown in 1831)

== Earls of Camperdown (1831) ==
- Robert Dundas Haldane-Duncan, 1st Earl of Camperdown (1785–1859)
- Adam Haldane-Duncan, 2nd Earl of Camperdown (1812–1867)
- Robert Adam Philips Haldane Haldane-Duncan, 3rd Earl of Camperdown (1841–1918)
- George Alexander Philips Haldane Haldane-Duncan, 4th Earl of Camperdown (1845–1933)
