= Camperduin =

- Hamlet
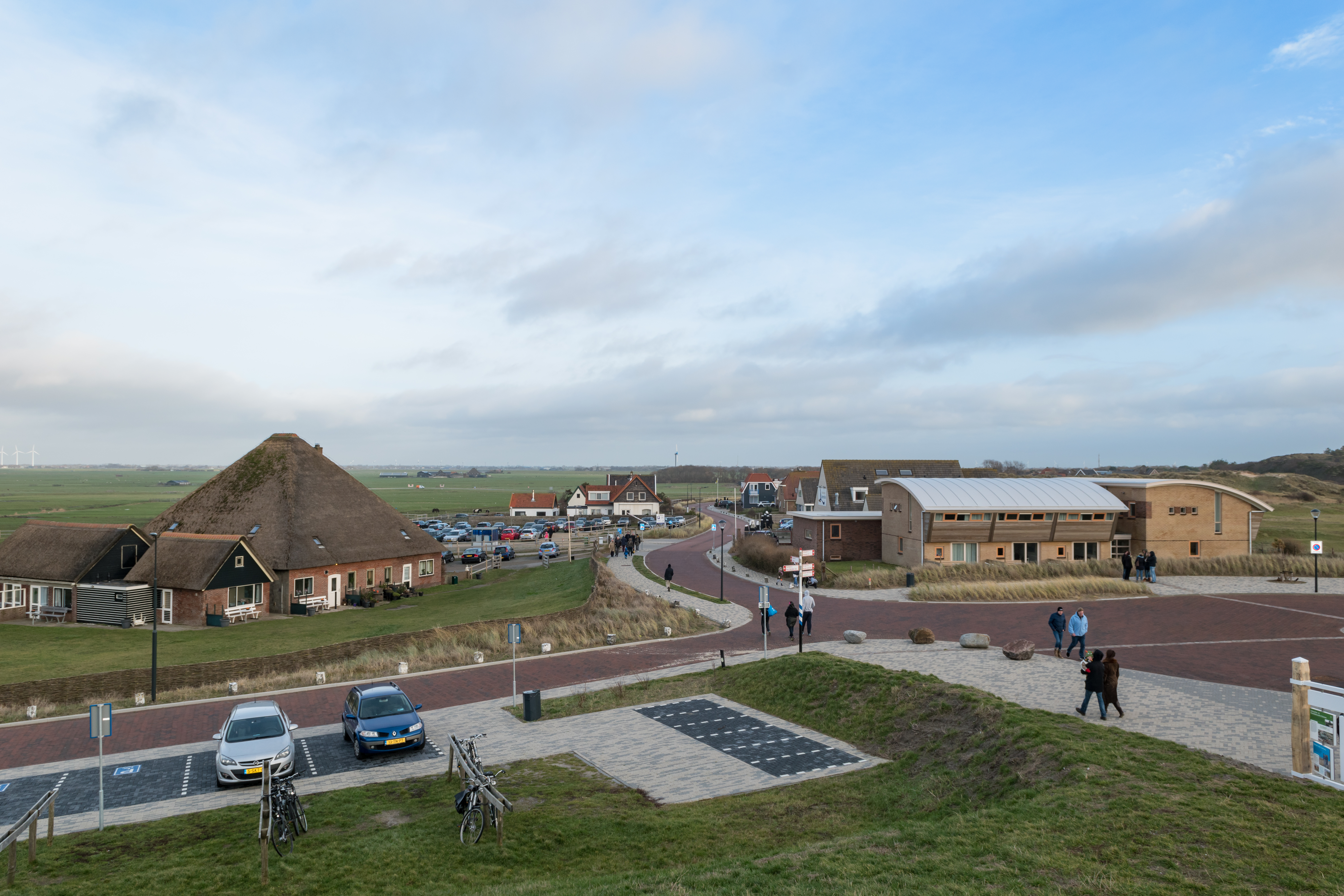

- Location in the Netherlands Location in the province of North Holland in the Netherlands
- Coordinates: 52°43′33″N 4°39′03″E
- Country: Netherlands
- Province: North Holland
- Municipality: Bergen

Area
  - Total: 1.10 km^{2} (0.42 sq mi)
- Elevation: 2.2 m (7.2 ft)

Population (2025)
  - Total: 265
  - Density: 241/km^{2} (624/sq mi)
- Time zone: UTC+1 (CET)
  - Summer (DST): UTC+2 (CEST)
- Postal code: 1871
- Dialing code: 072

Camperduin is a hamlet in the Dutch province of North Holland. It is part of the municipality of Bergen, and lies about 12 kilometres (7.5 mi) northwest of Alkmaar.

The hamlet was originally known simply as Camp or Kamp, with the name Camperduin ("dune of Camp") denoting the dunes that separated it from the sea. A church was built at Camp in 1689, but demolished in 1807.

The village gave its name to the Battle of Camperdown, which took place off the coast.

== Gallery ==
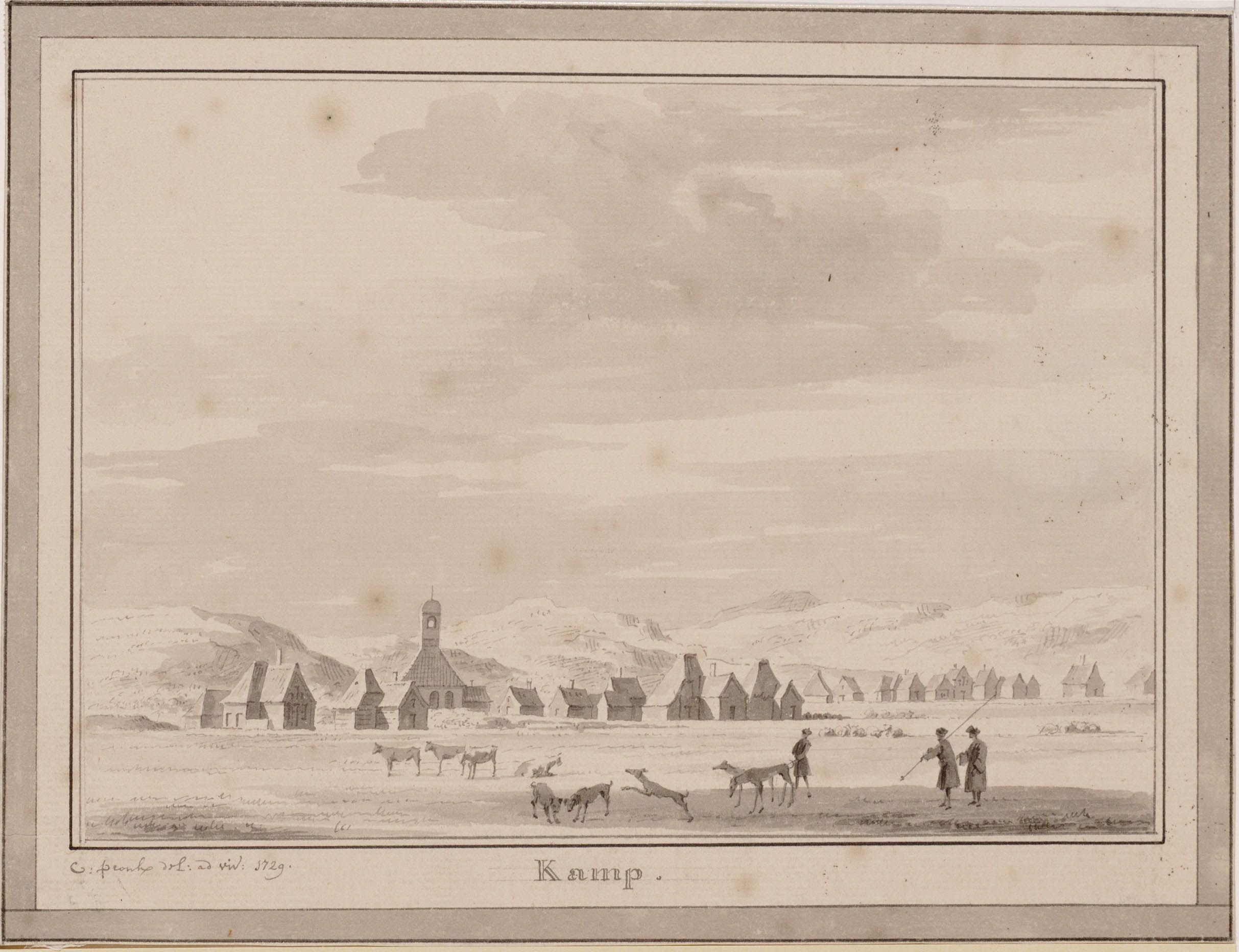
The hamlet of Camp in 1729

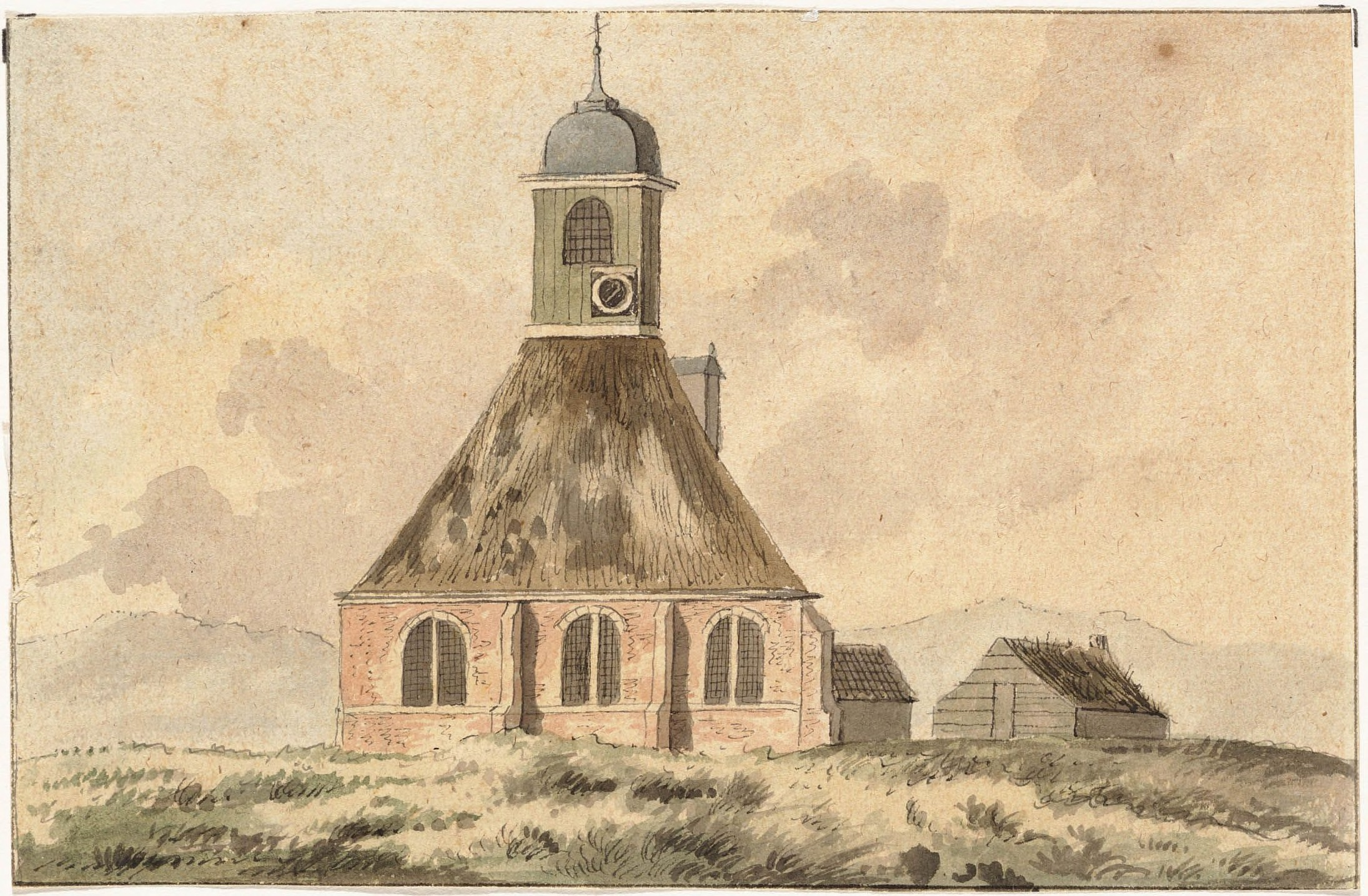
The former church of Camp

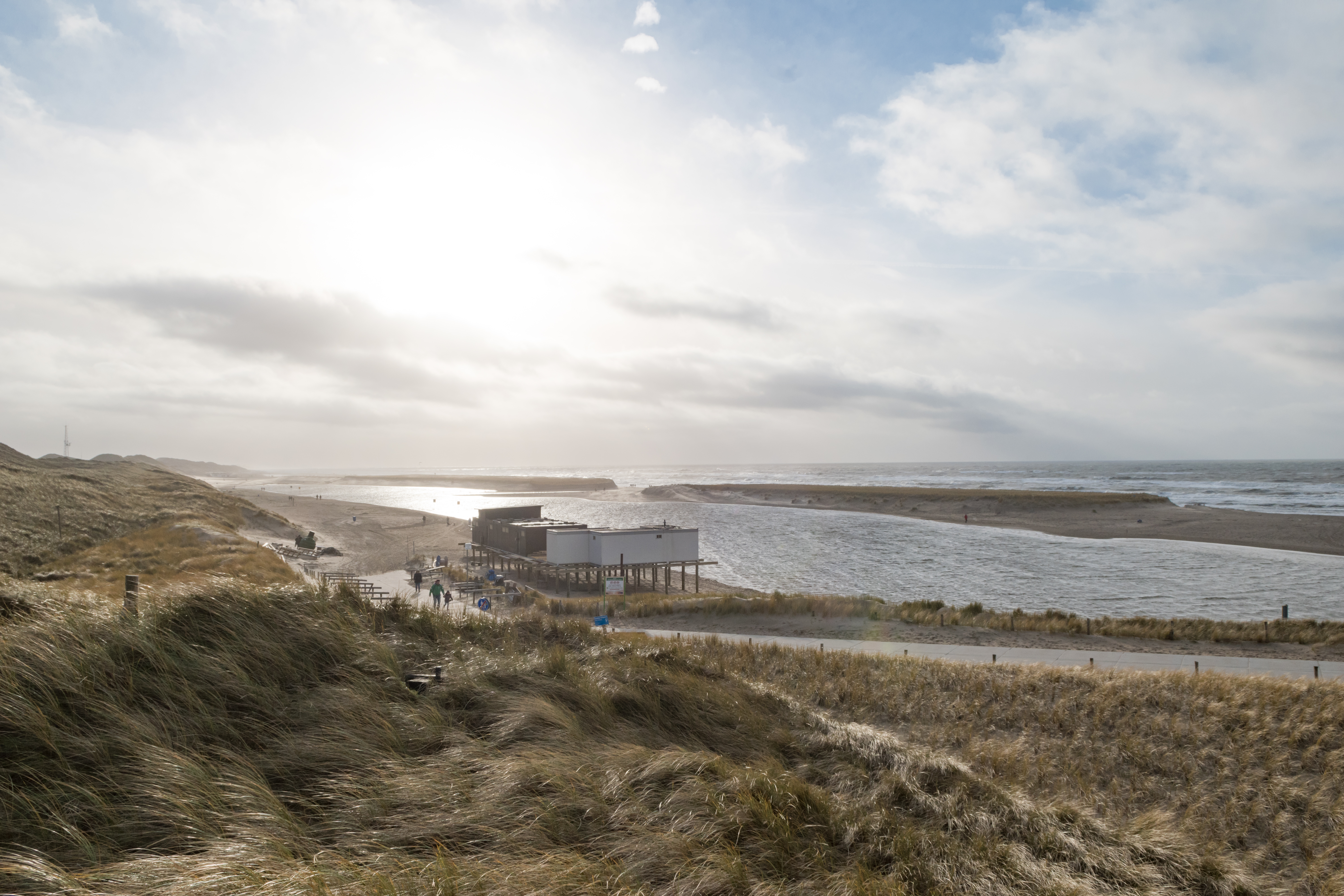
The beach at Camperduin
