= George Abercromby =

George Abercromby or Abercrombie may refer to:

- George Abercromby, 3rd Baron Abercromby (1800–1852), Scottish soldier, politician and peer
- George Abercromby, 2nd Baron Abercromby (1770–1843), Scottish lawyer, politician and peer
- George Abercromby, 4th Baron Abercromby (1838–1917), Scottish peer and politician
- Sir George Abercromby, 8th Baronet (1886–1964), Lord-Lieutenant of Banffshire
- George Francis Abercrombie (1896–1978), British physician
