= Governor Abercromby =

Governor Abercromby may refer to:

- John Abercromby (British Army officer) (1772–1817), Acting Governor of Madras in 1913
- Ralph Abercromby (1734–1801), Governor of Trinidad in 1797
- Robert Abercromby of Airthrey (1740–1827), Governor of Bombay from 1790 to 1792

== See also ==
- Neil Abercrombie (born 1938), 7th Governor of Hawaii
