= Clackmannanshire (Parliament of Scotland constituency) =

Parliamentary constituency to 1707

Before the Act of Union 1707, the barons of the shire of Clackmannan elected commissioners to represent them in the unicameral Parliament of Scotland and in the Convention of Estates. After 1708, Clackmannanshire and Kinross-shire alternated in returning one member to the House of Commons of Great Britain and later to the House of Commons of the United Kingdom.

== List of shire commissioners ==
- 1617: Robert Bruce, laird of Clackmannan
- 1639-1641: Sir Thomas Hope of Kerse
- 1639-1640: Sir Alexander Shaw of Sauchie; elected to serve in Hope's absence as necessary
- 1644 (convention): — Stewart, laird of Rosyth
- 1644: Sir Charles Erskine of Bandeath
- 1648: Robert Meldrum of Tillibody
- 1649-1650: Sir Charles Erskine of Bandeath
- 1650-1651: Sir Andrew Rollo, laird of Duncrub
- During the Protectorate, Linlithgowshire, Stirlingshire and Clackmannanshire jointly returned one member to the Commonwealth Parliament.
  - 1654-1655: Thomas Read
  - 1656-1658: Godfrey Rodes
  - 1659-1660: Adrian Scrope
- 1661-1663: Sir Henry Bruce of Clackmannan
- 1665 (convention): Sir Charles Erskine of Alva and Cambuskenneth
- 1667 (convention): Sir Henry Bruce of Clackmannan
- 1667 (convention): Sir Charles Erskine of Alva and Cambuskenneth
- 1669-1674: Sir Henry Bruce of Clackmannan
- 1678 (convention): David Bruce of Clackmannan
- 1681-1682: Sir William Sharp of Tullibodie
- 1685-1686: David Bruce of Clackmannan
- 1689 (convention): David Bruce of Clackmannan
- 1689: David Bruce of Clackmannan (seat declared vacant 28 April 1693 as he had not signed the assurance; vacant again 21 May 1700 as he had not signed the Association)
- 1700-1702: Sir John Erskine of Alva
- 1703-1707: Alexander Abercromby of Tullibody
