= Sir John Shaw, 3rd Baronet =

Scottish Whig politician (c. 1679–1752)

Sir John Shaw, 3rd Baronet (c. 1679–1752) of Greenock was a Scottish Whig politician who sat in the House of Commons between 1708 and 1734. He was instrumental in the construction of Greenock Harbour, and took part in actions against the Jacobite risings.

Shaw was the eldest son of Sir John Shaw, 2nd Baronet and his wife Eleanor Nicolson, daughter of Sir Thomas Nicolson, 2nd Baronet, of Carnock. The Shaw (or Schaw) family owned estates in Clackmannan, and his father became instrumental in developing the growth of Greenock to rival Glasgow on the River Clyde, and in particular seeking funds to build a harbour at Greenock. Shaw was educated at Glasgow in 1694. He married Margaret Dalrymple, eldest daughter of Hon. Sir Hew Dalrymple, 1st Baronet of North Berwick, Haddington on 15 March 1700. Also in 1700 he became a Burgess of Glasgow. He succeeded his father to the baronetcy on 16 April 1702 and set out to achieve his father's aim of creating a harbour at Greenock.

Shaw's various family properties at Greenock, Renfrewshire, Sauchie, Clackmannanshire; and Carnock Stirlingshire gave him several options for a parliamentary seat at the 1708 general election, and he chose to stand for Renfrewshire. He was returned unopposed as Member of Parliament for Renfrewshire. He and his fellow citizens raised their own funds to build Greenock Harbour, and the work was completed in 1710, with quays extended out into Sir John's Bay to enclose the harbour. Shaw did not stand at the 1710 and 1713 general elections, but he continued fight for better regulation of customs in western Scotland.

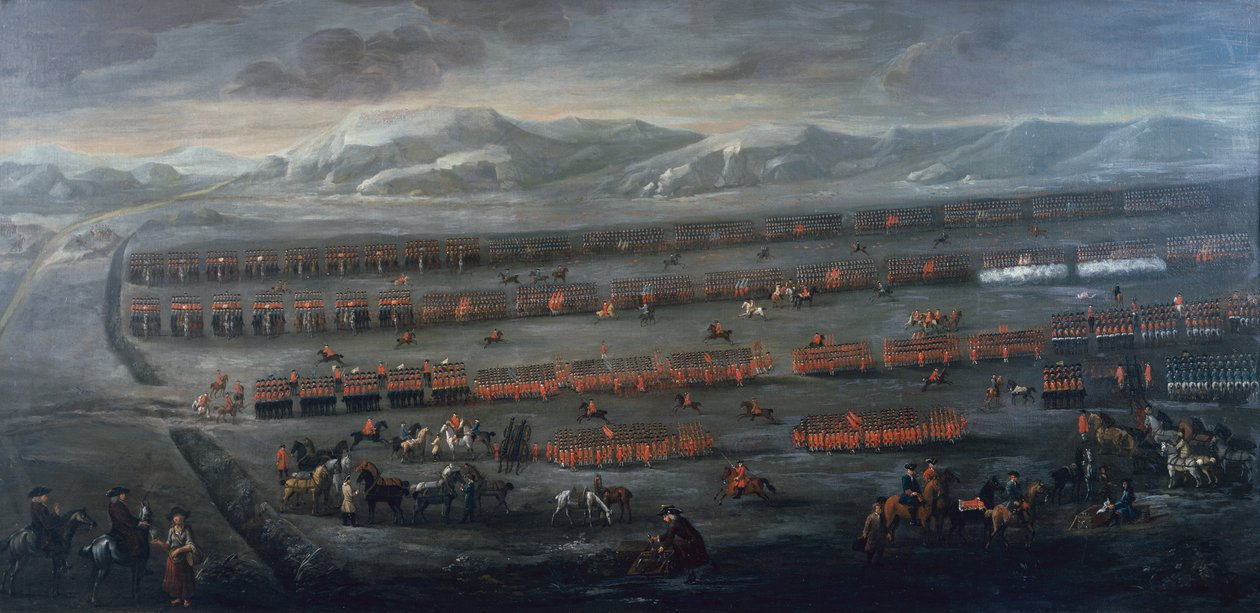
The Battle of Sheriffmuir, which Shaw fought in

Shaw celebrated the safe arrival of King George I in October 1714 in an elaborate manner. He did not stand at the 1715 general election but was active during the year in suppressing the Jacobite rising. He fought at several battles, including the Battle of Sheriffmuir in November 1715, acting closely with the Duke of Argyll. He became a burgess of Inveraray, the Duke's home town, in 1720.

With the support of the Duke of Argyll, Shaw revived his parliamentary career, and was returned as a Whig MP for Clackmannanshire in the 1722 general election. He supported the government and voted for the bills of pains and penalties against those involved in the Atterbury plot. He protested to Walpole against filling offices in Scotland with Englishmen. He was active on behalf of the Government. in the malt tax riots of 1725, when the Glasgow magistrates would not take action against the mob. For several years he had been pressing for strong measures to prevent the running of Irish goods into Scotland, and in 1725 was granted a commission which permitted him 'to burn all boats that shall bring meal or grain from Ireland to Scotland'.

Shaw was returned unopposed as MP for Renfrewshire at the 1727 general election. He continued to vote with the Administration. In 1734 he stood for parliament at Clackmannanshire but was unsuccessful. During the 1745 Jacobite rebellion, he and his wife mobilised support locally for General John Campbell's forces, and raised a militia in Greenock despite threats from the rebels.

Shaw died at Sauchie on 5 April 1752, and the baronetcy became extinct on his death. His daughter Marion married Charles Cathcart, 8th Lord Cathcart in 1718 and commissioned a new building at Nether Greenock Castle in the 1730. However, on her death in 1733 the mansion reverted to her father. On his death, his estates went to the family of his sister Margaret, who married Sir John Houston, 3rd Baronet and was grandmother of Sir John Stewart. Stewart adopted the additional surname Shaw, and his succession continued as the Shaw Stewart baronets of Greenock and Blackhall.

Parliament of Great Britain
New constituency	Member of Parliament for Renfrewshire; 1708 –1710	Succeeded by Sir Robert Pollock, 1st Baronet
Vacant Alternating constituency Title last held by Sir John Erskine, 3rd Baronet	Member of Parliament for Clackmannanshire; 1722–1727 -	Vacant Alternating constituency Title last held by James Erskine
Preceded by Thomas Cochrane	Member of Parliament for Renfrewshire; 1727–1734	Succeeded by Alexander Cunninghame
Baronetage of Nova Scotia
Preceded by John Shaw	Baronet (of Greenock); 1702-1752	Extinct
