= Mary Abercromby, 1st Baroness Abercromby =

The Right Honourable The Baroness Abercromby

suo jure Baroness Abercromby
- Reign: 1801–21
- Predecessor: New Creation
- Successor: George Abercromby
- Born: Before 1752
- Died: 11 February 1821 (aged 68–69)
- Spouse: Sir Ralph Abercromby
- Issue: Anne Abercromby; Mary Abercromby; Catherine Abercromby; George Abercromby, 2nd Baron Abercromby; Gen. Sir John Abercromby; James Abercromby, 1st Baron Dunfermline; Lt.-Col. Alexander Abercromby
- Father: John Menzies
- Mother: Ann Campbell

Mary Anne Abercromby, 1st Baroness Abercromby (née Menzies; born ca. 1752 – 11 February 1821) was a Scottish peeress, socialite and the wife of General Ralph Abercromby.

== Biography ==
Mary Anne was the daughter of John Menzies and Ann, daughter of Patrick Campbell. She was created suo jure 1st Baroness Abercromby, of Aboukir and of Tullibody, in the County of Clackmannanshire, by Letters Patent on 28 May 1801. The barony was awarded in recognition of her late husband's gallantry at the Battle of Alexandria, at which he was mortally wounded. On her death in 1821 she was succeeded in the barony by George, her eldest son.

== Family ==
She married Captain Ralph Abercromby (later Lt.-Gen. Sir Ralph Abercromby), son of George Abercromby and Mary Dundas, on 17 November 1767. They had children:

- Anne Abercromby (died 1844), married Donald Cameron, 22nd of Lochiel and had issue
- Mary Abercromby (died 1825)
- Catherine Abercromby (died 1841)
- George Abercromby, 2nd Baron Abercromby (1770–1843)
- Gen. Sir John Abercromby (1772–1817)
- James Abercromby, 1st Baron Dunfermline (1776–1858)
- Lt.-Col. Alexander Abercromby (1784–1853)

== Notes ==
Peerage of the United Kingdom
New creation	Baroness Abercromby; 1801–1821	Succeeded by George Abercromby
