= George Abercromby, 2nd Baron Abercromby =

Scottish lawyer and politician (1770-1843)

The Right Honourable The Lord Abercromby
- 2nd Baron Abercromby
- Predecessor: Mary Abercromby, 1st Baroness Abercromby
- Successor: George Abercromby, 3rd Baron Abercromby
- Born: George Abercromby; 14 October 1770; Tullibody, Clackmannanshire, Scotland
- Died: 15 February 1843 (aged 72); Airthrey Castle, Stirlingshire, Scotland
- Spouse: Montague Dundas (m. 1799; died 1837)
- Issue: George Abercromby, 3rd Baron Abercromby; Montague Maule-Ramsay, Countess of Dalhousie; Mary Ann Brown
- Parents: Ralph Abercromby; Mary Abercromby, 1st Baroness Abercromby

George Abercromby, 2nd Baron Abercromby (14 October 1770 – 15 February 1843) was a Scottish lawyer, politician and peer. The eldest son of Lt.-Gen. Sir Ralph Abercromby and Mary Abercromby, 1st Baroness Abercromby, he became, like his grandfather, a lawyer, and was called to the bar in 1794. On his death in 1843 he was succeeded in the barony by his son.

== Career ==
He was a Whig Member of Parliament for Edinburgh, 1805–1806; and for Clackmannanshire, 1806–1807 and 1812–1815. On the death of his mother on 11 February 1821 he succeeded to the title of 2nd Baron Abercromby. He also inherited the estate of Airthrey from his uncle, Robert Abercromby of Airthrey, in 1827. He was Lord Lieutenant of Stirlingshire, 1837–1843 and, despite his age and illness, greeted Queen Victoria on her progress through Scotland in 1842. Upon his death, he was buried at Tullibody.

== Family ==
He married Montague Dundas (born 30 April 1772), third daughter of Henry Dundas, 1st Viscount Melville and Elizabeth Rennie, in Edinburgh on 25 January 1799 and had issue:

- George Ralph Campbell Abercromby, 3rd Baron Abercromby (1800–1852). Married 3 April 1832 Louisa-Penuel, b. 22 July 1810. (Daughter of John Hay-Forbes, a Lord of Session in the Justiciary of Scotland)
- Montague Abercromby (1807–1853), married Fox Maule-Ramsay, 11th Earl of Dalhousie (1831)
- Mary Ann Abercromby (1811–1898), married Col. N.R. Brown (1857)

Parliament of the United Kingdom
Preceded by Charles Hope	Member of Parliament for Edinburgh; 1805–1806	Succeeded by Sir Patrick Murray
Preceded by Sir Robert Abercromby (until 1802)	Member of Parliament for Clackmannanshire; 1806–1807; 1812–1815	Succeeded by Sir John Abercromby
Honorary titles
Preceded by The Duke of Montrose	Lord Lieutenant of Stirlingshire; 1837–1843	Succeeded by The Duke of Montrose
Peerage of the United Kingdom
Preceded by Mary Anne Abercromby	Baron Abercromby; 1821–1843	Succeeded by George Abercromby
