= Baron Abercromby =

Extinct barony in the Peerage of the United Kingdom

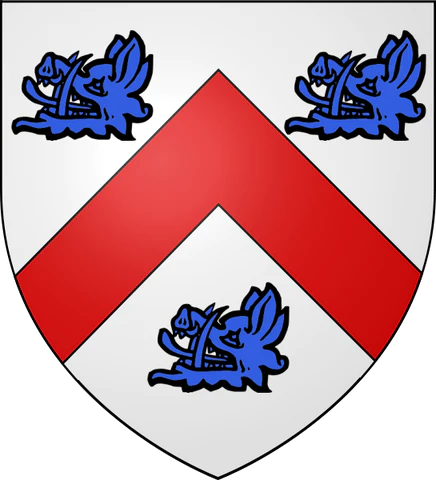
- Creation date: 28 May 1801
- Created by: George III
- Peerage: Peerage of the United Kingdom
- First holder: Mary Abercromby, 1st Baroness
- Last holder: John Abercromby, 6th Baron
- Remainder to: heirs male of the body of the 1st Baroness by her husband, Ralph Abercromby

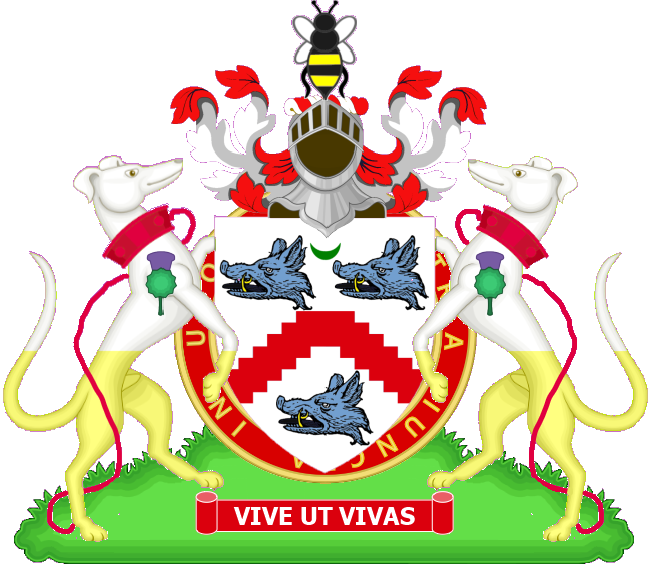
Achievement of Sir Ralph Abercromby

Baron Abercromby, of Aboukir and Tullibody, was a title in the peerage of the United Kingdom. It was created on 28 May 1801 for Mary, Lady Abercromby, in honour of her husband, the noted military commander Lieutenant-General Sir Ralph Abercromby, who won the Battle of Aboukir in 1801 and later died from wounds at the Battle of Alexandria. The latter was the grandson of Alexander Abercromby, member of the Scottish Parliament for Clackmannanshire from 1703 to 1707, younger son of Sir Alexander Abercromby, 1st Baronet, of Birkenbog (see Abercromby baronets).

Lady Abercromby was succeeded by her eldest son, George, the second baron. He represented Edinburgh and Clackmannan in the House of Commons. On his death the title passed to his son George, the third baron. He sat as member of parliament for Clackmannanshire, Stirling and Clackmannan and Kinross. He was succeeded by his eldest son, the fourth baron. He was deputy lieutenant of Stirlingshire in 1860. He was childless and was succeeded by his younger brother John, the fifth baron. He was president of the Society of Antiquaries of Scotland. On his death in 1924 without male issue the barony became extinct.

James Abercromby, third son of Sir Ralph Abercromby and Baroness Abercromby, served as speaker of the House of Commons from 1835 to 1839 and was created Baron Dunfermline in 1839.

== Barons Abercromby (1801) ==
- Mary Anne Abercromby, 1st Baroness Abercromby (d. 1821)
- George Abercromby, 2nd Baron Abercromby (1770–1843)
- George Ralph Campbell Abercromby, 3rd Baron Abercromby (1800–1852)
- George Ralph Campbell Abercromby, 4th Baron Abercromby (1838–1917)
- John Abercromby, 5th Baron Abercromby (1841–1924)

== See also ==
- Abercromby baronets, of Birkenbog
- Baron Dunfermline
