= Thomas Matthias Weguelin (East India Company officer) =

English soldier

- Born: London
- Died: 23 May 1828; London
- Occupation: Soldier

Thomas Matthias Weguelin (died 23 May 1828) was an English soldier.

== Biography ==
Weguelin born at Moorfields in London. He was the eldest son of John Christopher Weguelin by his second wife, Elizabeth. He was appointed a cadet in the East India Company's service in March 1781 on the Bengal presidency. He arrived in Calcutta in April 1782, having previously been promoted to an ensigncy on 16 June 1781. He joined the third European regiment at Burhánpur, and received a lieutenant's commission on 22 September 1782. In November he was removed to the first battalion of the 22nd native infantry, at the frontier station of Fatehgarh in the dominions of the nawáb of Oudh. In March 1783 he proceeded to the Farukhábád district, where he took part in some petty operations, and in 1796, when his regiment was incorporated with the 2nd native infantry, he received the brevet rank of captain. He served against Tipú Saib from 1790 to 1792 with Lieutenant-colonel John Cockrell's detachment. He took part in the battle of Seringapatam on 13 May 1791, in the assault on the enemy's entrenched camp on 6 February 1792, and in the siege of the city. In December 1797 he was transferred to the first battalion of the 13th native infantry, which he commanded in 1799 during the deposition of the nawáb of Oudh, and shortly after joined the 1st European regiment at Cawnpur, removing with it to Dinápur at the close of the year. On 10 August 1801 he received the regimental rank of captain, and in September 1803 he proceeded in command of the flank companies of his regiment to join the army under Lord Lake, then engaged with the Marattas in the north-west, where he took part in the siege of Gwalior. In September 1804 he accompanied Lake's army in the capacity of judge-advocate-general in the field provinces north and west of Allahábád, and took part in the siege of Bhartpur. He continued to hold the post until his appointment to a majority on 3 March 1808. In June he was nominated to command an expedition for the defence of the Portuguese of Macao against any French attempt, receiving the local rank of colonel. On his return to Bengal in February 1809 he received the thanks of the governor-general for his conduct. On the establishment of the commissariat in Bengal on 1 February 1810 Weguelin was appointed deputy commissary-general. He accompanied Major-general Sir John Abercromby in the expedition against Mauritius in 1810 as head of the commissariat department, and after the reduction of the island was appointed by the governor, Sir Robert Townsend Farquhar, commissary-general of Mauritius, Bourbon, and their dependencies. He returned to Bengal in March 1812 with a letter from Farquhar to the governor in council expressing his approbation of his services. On 1 July 1812 he was nominated commissary-general of Bengal with the rank of lieutenant-colonel, attaining the regimental rank on 16 March 1814. He discharged the duties of commissary-general through the two wars with Nepál between 1814 and 1816, and that with the Pindáris from 1816 to 1818, conducting the business of his office with so much ability that the extra expenses of the wars did not exceed the comparatively small sum of 600,000l. Being obliged by private affairs to return to England, he resigned his office at the close of 1820, embarking in January 1822. He received the rank of colonel commandant on 20 July 1823, and died in London at Montagu Square on 23 May 1828. He was twice married. By his first wife he had a son and a daughter, and by his second wife three sons.
