= John Abercromby, 5th Baron Abercromby =

Scottish soldier and archaeologist (1841-1924)

The Right Honourable The Lord Abercromby FSA Scot FRSE
- 5th Baron Abercromby
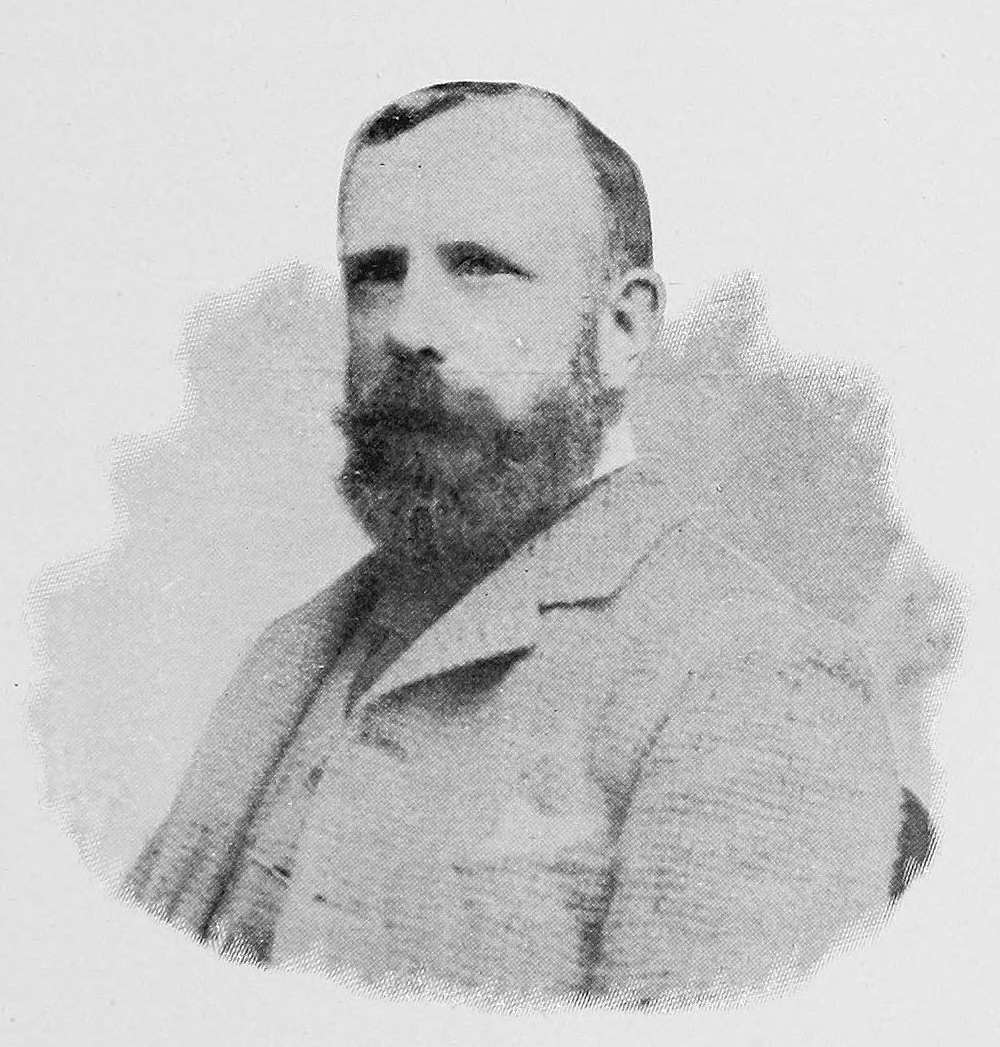
- Predecessor: George Abercromby, 4th Baron Abercromby
- Successor: Title extinct
- Born: John Abercromby; 15 January 1841; Logie, Perthshire, Scotland
- Died: 7 October 1924 (aged 83); Edinburgh, Midlothian, Scotland
- Spouse(s): Adele von Heidenstern (m. 1876; div. 1879)
- Issue: Edla Nasos
- Parents: George Abercromby, 3rd Baron Abercromby; Louisa Penuel Forbes

John Abercromby, 5th Baron Abercromby of Tullibody FSA Scot FRSE (15 January 1841 – 7 October 1924) was a Scottish soldier and archaeologist.

== Life ==
Abercromby was born in Tullibody House as the son of George Abercromby, 3rd Baron Abercromby, and Louisa Penuel Forbes, and had two brothers and a sister. He was educated at Harrow School in London as a boarder.

Around 1860 he received a commission in the Rifle Brigade but resigned in 1870 having risen no higher than Lieutenant. During this period he saw no conflict but was posted in Canada for a year.

After leaving the army in 1870 he devoted himself to languages, travel, and folklore. In 1904 he introduced the term beaker into the archaeological lexicon to describe the copper age drinking vessels being found all over western Europe.

He moved to Edinburgh in 1895 living at 62 Palmerston Place.

In 1898 he was elected a Fellow of the Royal Society of Edinburgh. His proposers were Lt Col Frederick Bailey, Alexander Buchan, John McLaren, Lord McLaren, and Peter Guthrie Tait.

In 1911 he was still living at 62 Palmerston Place in Edinburgh's fashionable West End.

He received an honorary doctorate from the University of Edinburgh with an honorary Doctorate of Law (LLD) in later life. On 3 October 1917, following the death of his elder brother George, he succeeded as the fifth Lord Abercromby. Prior to this he was styled the Hon. John Abercromby.

He supported the Society of Antiquaries of Scotland and served as its president from 1913 to 1918. His will provided for the foundation of the Abercromby Chair of Archaeology at Edinburgh University, a post occupied by Vere Gordon Childe and Stuart Piggott.

He died on 7 October 1924 and is buried in Dean Cemetery in Edinburgh at its east side, close to the main entrance.

Tullibody House was demolished following a fire in 1961.

== Family ==
Abercromby married his Swedish cousin, Adele Wilhelmina Marika von Heidenstern, on 26 August 1876. They had one daughter, Edla Louisa Montague Abercromby (b. 1877), who married Georges N. Nasos in 1906.

John and Adele divorced in 1879 after only three years of marriage. As he had no son, the Barony of Abercromby became extinct on his death.

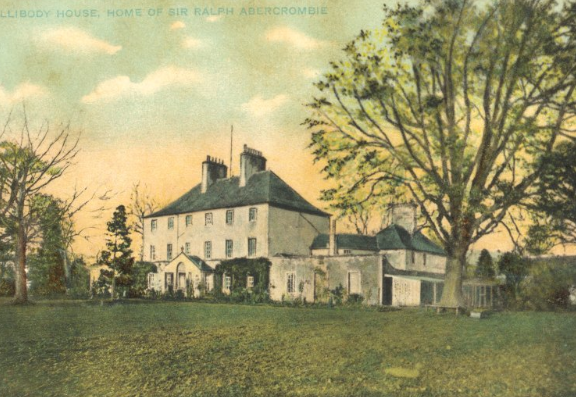
Tullibody House

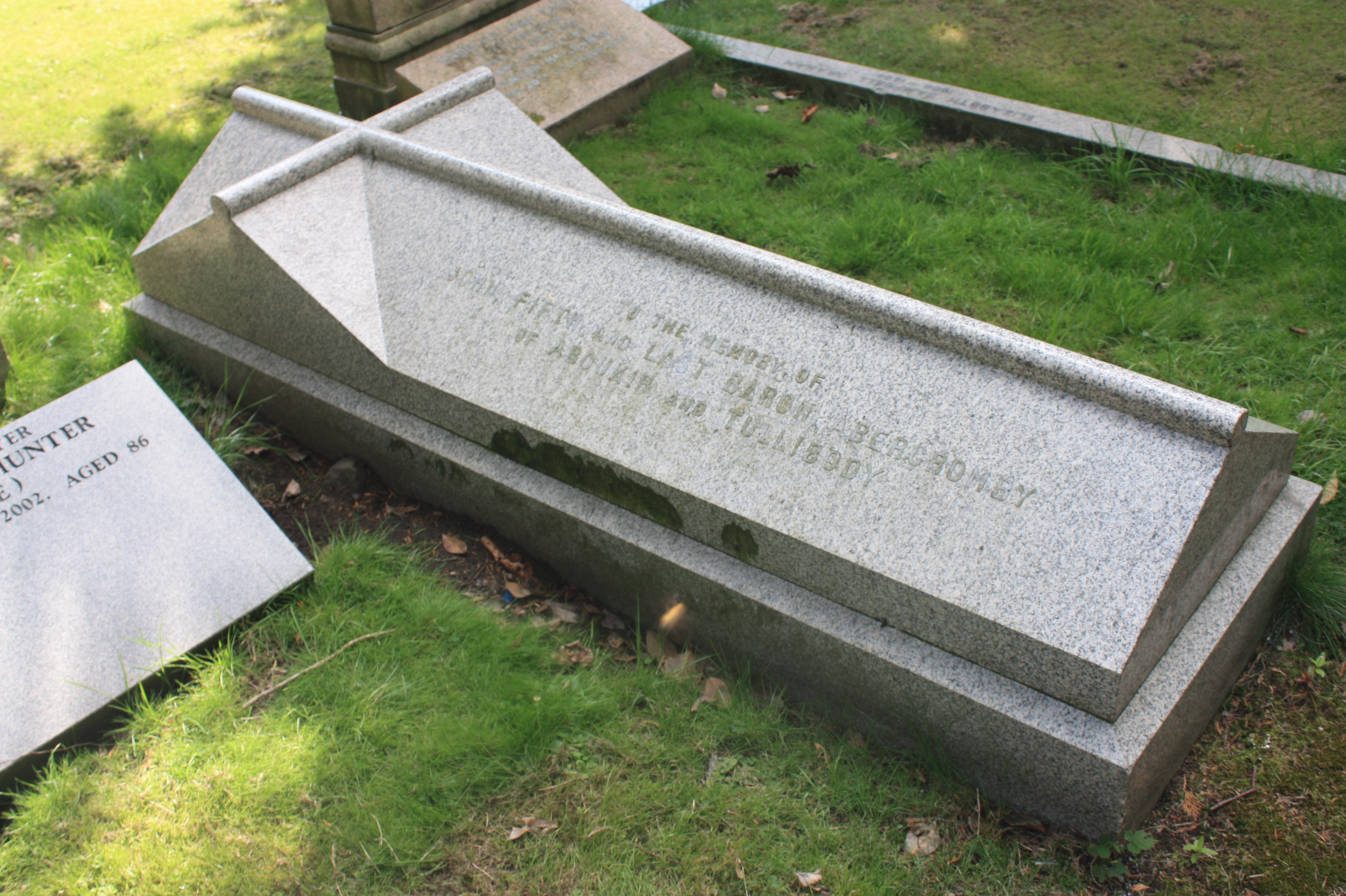
Lord Abercromby's grave, Dean Cemetery

== Works ==
- A trip through the Eastern Caucasus: with a chapter on the languages of the country, London: Edward Stanford, 1889
- "The pre- and proto-historic Finns, both Eastern and Western: with the magic songs of the west Finns", Grimm Library, vol. 9–10, 2 vols, London: Nutt, 1898
  - vol. 1, vol. 1, vol. 2, vol. 2
  - Much of this material was first published as a series of articles by The Folklore Society in Folklore as 'Magic Songs of the Finns' : v.1 (1890), 17–46, 331–48; v.2 (1891), 31–49; v.3 (1892), 49–66; v.4 (1893), 27–49.
- Haddon, A. C. (1912), "A study of the Bronze Age pottery of Great Britain and Ireland and its associated grave-goods", Nature, 2 vols (2236), Oxford: Clarendon Press: 2, Bibcode:1912Natur..90....2H, doi:10.1038/090002a0, S2CID 3971337
  - vol. 1, vol. 2

Peerage of the United Kingdom
Preceded by George Abercromby	Baron Abercromby; 1917–1924	Extinct
