= Patrick Green (VC) =

Irish Victoria Cross recipient (1824–1889)

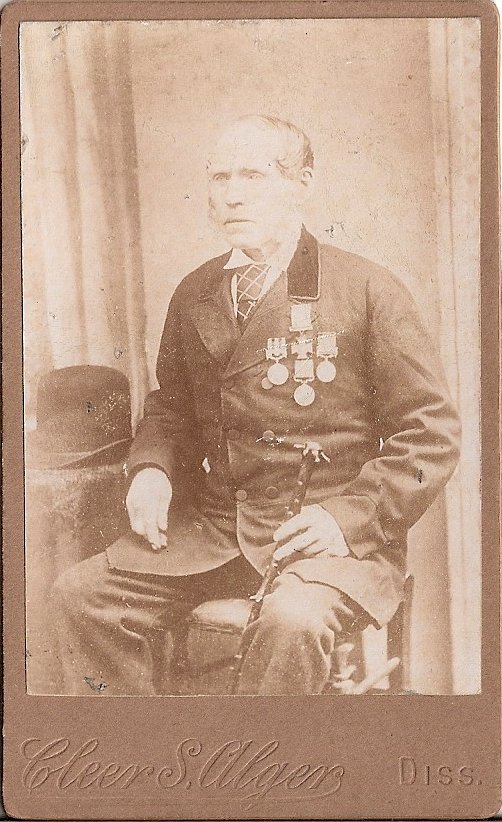
- Colour Sergeant Patrick Green
- Born: 1824; Ballinasloe, County Galway
- Died: 19 July 1889 (aged 64-65); Cork
- Burial place: Aghada Cemetery, Cork
- Military career
- Allegiance: United Kingdom
- Branch: British Army
- Rank: Colour-Sergeant
- Units: 75th Regiment of Foot
- Conflicts: Indian Mutiny
- Awards: Victoria Cross

Patrick Green VC (1824 – 19 July 1889) was born in Ballinasloe, County Galway and was an Irish recipient of the Victoria Cross, the highest and most prestigious award for gallantry in the face of the enemy that can be awarded to British and Commonwealth forces.

== Details ==
He was approximately 33 years old, and a private in the 75th Regiment of Foot (later The Gordon Highlanders), British Army during the Indian Mutiny when the following deed took place on 11 September 1857 at Delhi, India, for which he was awarded the VC.

For the Act of Bravery recorded in a General Order, issued by the Commander-in-Chief in India, of which the following is a copy:

" Head-Quarters, Allahabad, July 28, 1858.
"GENERAL ORDER,
" The Commander-in-Chief in India is pleased to approve that the undermentioned soldier be presented, in the name of Her Most Gracious Majesty, with a Medal of the Victoria Cross, for valour and daring in the field, viz.:
Private Patrick Green, Her Majesty's 75th Foot, for having, on the 11th of September, 1857, when the picquet at the Koodsia Baugh at Delhi was hotly pressed by a large body of the Enemy, successfully rescued a comrade, who had fallen wounded as a skirmisher.
(Signed) C. CAMPBELL, General,

Commander-in-Chief, East Indies."

He later achieved the rank of colour-sergeant. He died in Cork.
