= Alexander Abercromby (British Army officer) =

British Army officer and politician (1784–1853)

Colonel Alexander Abercromby CB
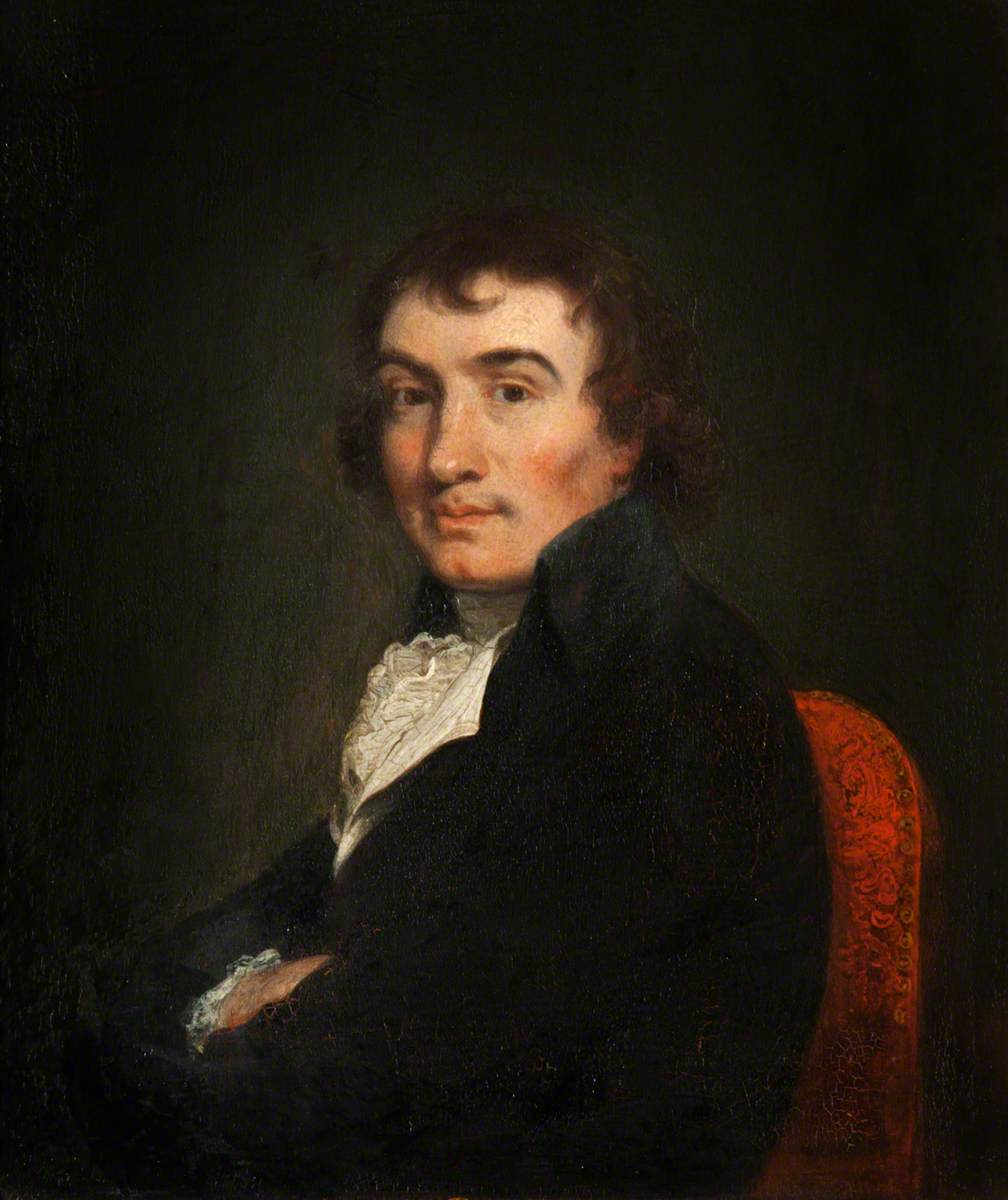
- Portrait of Abercromby
- Born: 4 March 1784
- Died: 27 August 1853 (aged 69)
- Relatives: Sir Ralph Abercromby (father); Sir John Abercromby (brother)
- Military career
- Allegiance: Great Britain; United Kingdom
- Branch: British Army
- Service years: 1799–1815
- Rank: Colonel
- Commands: 28th (North Gloucestershire) Regiment of Foot; Coldstream Regiment of Foot Guards
- Conflicts: French Revolutionary Wars; Napoleonic Wars
- Awards: Order of the Bath; Military Order of Maria Theresa (Austria); Order of the Tower and Sword (Portugal); Order of St. George (Russia)
- Other work: MP for Clackmannanshire (1817–1818)

Colonel Alexander Abercromby, CB (4 March 1784 – 27 August 1853) was a British Army officer and politician who served in the French Revolutionary and Napoleonic Wars. He also served for a short time as a Member of Parliament for Clackmannanshire.

== Biography ==
Alexander Abercromby was the youngest son of Sir Ralph Abercromby, a British Army officer noted for his services during the French Revolutionary Wars and Mary Abercromby, 1st Baroness Abercromby. Born on 4 March 1784, Abercromby entered the army at an early age, and served as a volunteer with the 92nd Regiment in the expedition to the Helder in 1799. He soon obtained a commission, and saw service with his regiment in Egypt. He was appointed aide-de-camp to his father's old lieutenant and friend, Sir John Moore, during his command in Sicily in 1806, but was not with him in Spain.

Like his brother John, he was rapidly promoted, and in 1808, when only twenty-four, became lieutenant colonel of the 28th (North Gloucestershire) Regiment of Foot. He accompanied his regiment when it was sent to Portugal to reinforce Lord Wellesley after the Battle of Talavera. He commanded it at the Battle of Bussaco, and in the lines of Torres Vedras, and as senior officer had the good fortune to command his brigade at the Battle of Albuera. His services there were very conspicuous, and his brigade has been immortalised by Charles James Napier. He was soon superseded, but commanded his regiment at the battles of Arroyo de Molinos and Almaraz.

In 1812 he was removed to the staff of the army, and was present as assistant-quartermaster-general at the battles of Vitoria, the Pyrenees and Orthez. He served in the same capacity in 1815, and was present at the battles of Quatre Bras and Waterloo.

For his active services he was promoted to colonel of Coldstream Regiment of Foot Guards, and made a companion of the Bath, a knight of the order of Maria Theresa of Austria, of the Tower and Sword of Portugal, and of St. George of Russia. He was returned to parliament in the Whig interest in 1817 for the county of Clackmannan in place of his brother Sir John, but retired next year. He was in command of the 2nd Guards, but retired on half-pay when there seemed to be no chance of another war, and died at his country seat in Scotland on 27 August 1853. He had no small share of the military ability of his family, and was an admirable regimental and staff officer; but the long peace which followed Waterloo gave him no opportunity to show whether he had his father's ability to command an army.

== Honours ==
- Companion of the Order of the Bath (1815)
- Knight of the Order of the Tower and Sword
- Knight of the Military Order of Maria Theresa
- Fourth Class, Order of St. George

== Notes ==
Parliament of the United Kingdom
Preceded by Sir John Abercromby	Member of Parliament for Clackmannanshire; 1817–1818	Succeeded by Robert Bruce (from 1820)
