= Clackmannanshire (UK Parliament constituency) =

Parliamentary constituency in the United Kingdom, 1801–1832

- Former county constituency for the House of Commons
- Subdivisions of Scotland: Clackmannanshire

1708–1832
- Seats: one
- Created from: Clackmannanshire
- Replaced by: Clackmannanshire and Kinross-shire

Clackmannanshire was a county constituency of the House of Commons of Great Britain from 1708 until 1800, and of the House of Commons of the United Kingdom from 1801 to 1832.

== The constituency ==
Clackmannanshire was Scotland's smallest county. The British parliamentary constituency was created in 1708 following the Acts of Union, 1707 and replaced the former Parliament of Scotland shire constituency of Clackmannanshire. Clackmannanshire was paired as an alternating constituency with neighbouring Kinross-shire. The freeholders of Clackmannanshire elected one Member of Parliament (MP) to one Parliament, while those of Kinross-shire elected a Member to the next.

== Abolition ==
The Representation of the People (Scotland) Act 1832 abolished the alternating constituencies. Clackmannanshire was merged with Kinross-shire into the single constituency of Clackmannanshire and Kinross-shire, electing one Member between them to each Parliament.

== Members of Parliament ==
Election	Member	Notes	Ref
16 June 1708	William Dalrymple		
1710	none		
18 September 1713	Sir John Erskine, 3rd Baronet		
1715	none		
19 April 1722	Sir John Shaw, 3rd Baronet		
1727	none		
10 May 1734	James Erskine		
1741	none		
25 July 1747	Thomas Erskine		
1754	none		
10 April 1761	James Abercromby		
1768	none		
3 November 1774	Ralph Abercromby		
1780	none		
10 April 1784	Charles Allan Cathcart	Died 10 June 1788.	
29 November 1788	Burnet Abercromby		
1790	none		
21 June 1796	Sir Ralph Abercromby	Appointed Steward of the Chiltern Hundreds, 8 February 1798.	
26 February 1798	Sir Robert Abercromby		
1802	none		
18 November 1806	George Abercromby		
1807	none		
22 October 1812	George Abercromby	Appointed Escheator of Munster, July 1815.	
7 August 1815	Sir John Abercromby	Died 14 February 1817.	
11 April 1817	Alexander Abercromby		
1818	none		
27 March 1820	Robert Bruce	Appointed Steward of the Chiltern Hundreds, 13 July 1824.	
13 July 1824	George Ralph Abercromby		
1826	none		
10 August 1830	George Ralph Abercromby		
1831	none		
