= John Thomas Hill =

British Army general

General John Thomas Hill
- Born: 10 January 1811; Pilton, Devon
- Died: 15 April 1902 (aged 91); Newton Abbot, Devon
- Burial place: Pilton, Devon
- Military career
- Allegiance: United Kingdom
- Branch: British Army
- Rank: General

General John Thomas Hill (10 January 1811 – 15 April 1902) was a senior British Army officer.

== Military career ==
He was born in Pilton, Devon and commissioned as an ensign in the 32nd Regiment of Foot on 13 March 1827. He was promoted to lieutenant on 19 April 1829, to captain on 13 February 1835 and to major on 12 March 1841. He was further promoted lieutenant-colonel in the 21st Regiment of Foot on 3 April 1846, and colonel in the 20th Regiment of Foot in June 1854.

He was given the colonelcy of the 75th Regiment of Foot on 24 October 1872 (until 1881), becoming Colonel of the 1st Battalion, Gordon Highlanders after their amalgamation with the Queen's Own Highlanders (Seaforth and Camerons). Promoted to full general on 24 June 1876, he transferred to be colonel of the 1st Battalion of the Duke of Cornwall's Light Infantry on 8 April 1890 and colonel of the full regiment in September 1892.

He died in 1902 at his home in Newton Abbot and was buried in St Mary's church, Pilton, where there is a memorial plaque to his memory.
