= Airthrey Castle =

Building at the University of Stirling, Scotland

Coordinates: 56°08′53.52″N 03°54′48.528″W

Designations

Inventory of Gardens and Designed Landscapes in Scotland
- Official name: University of Stirling (Airthrey Castle)
- Designated: 30 June 1987
- Reference no.: GDL00010

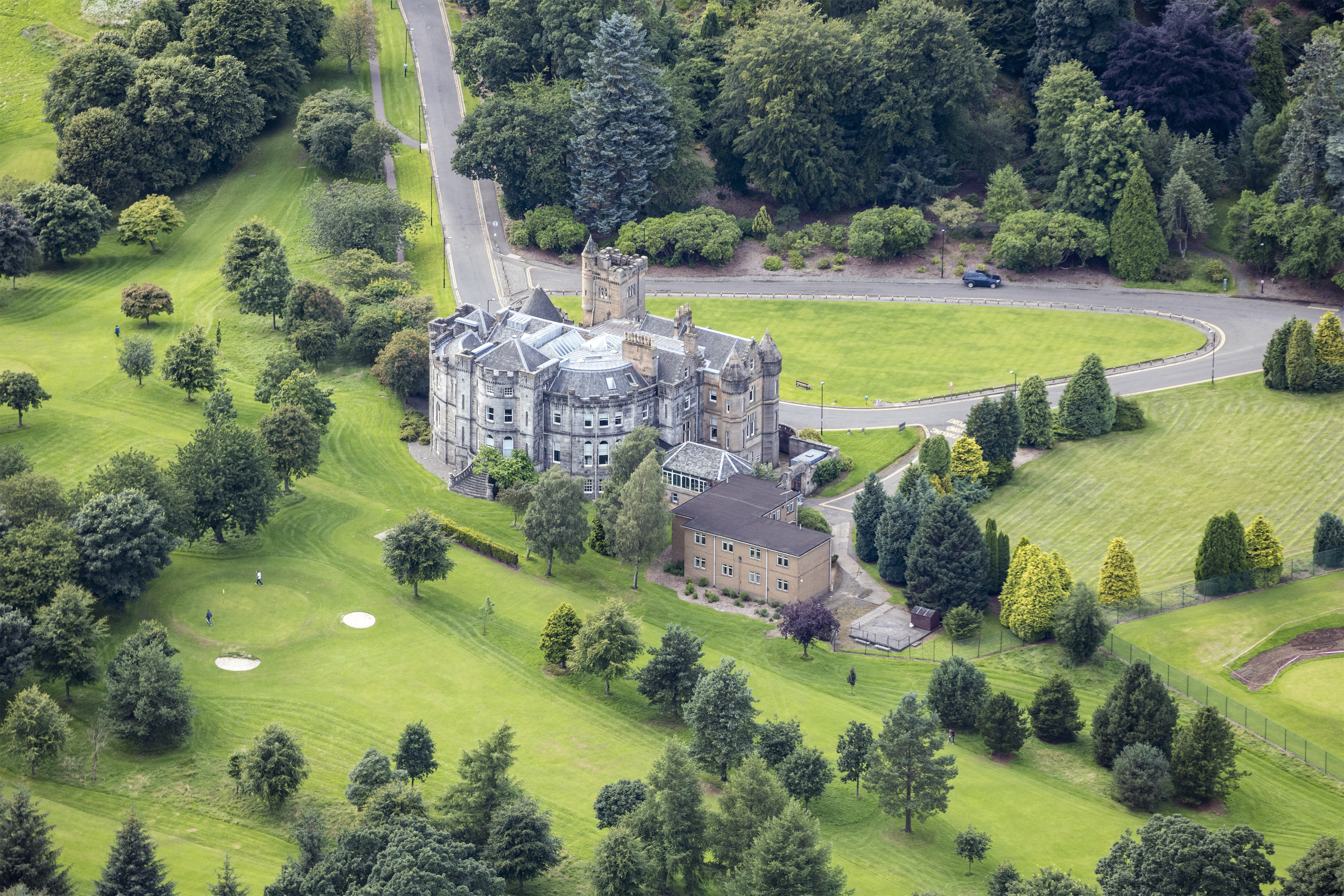
Aerial view of Airthrey Castle

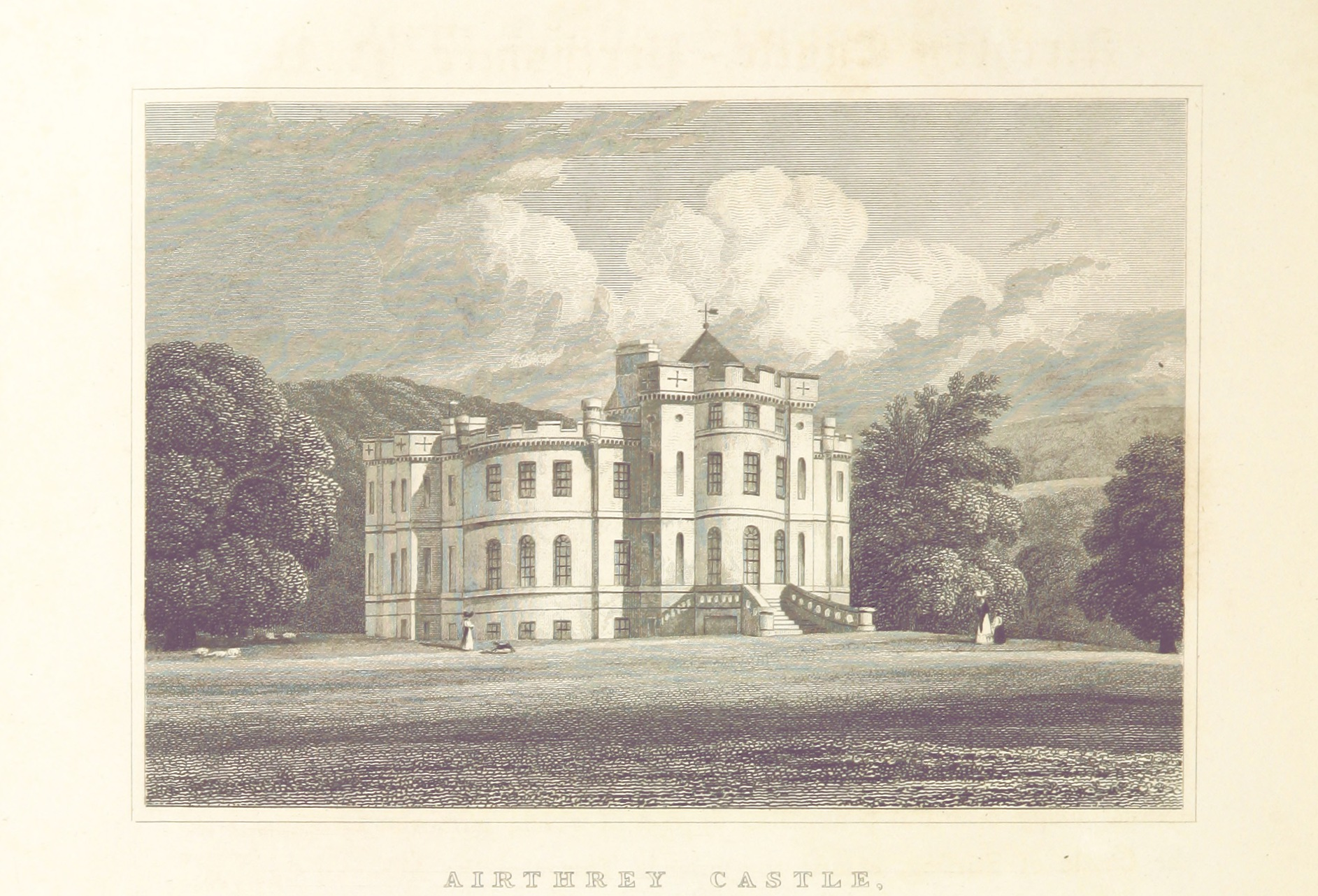
Airthrey Castle from the south-west in 1829, as built by Robert Haldane, showing the Robert Adam design

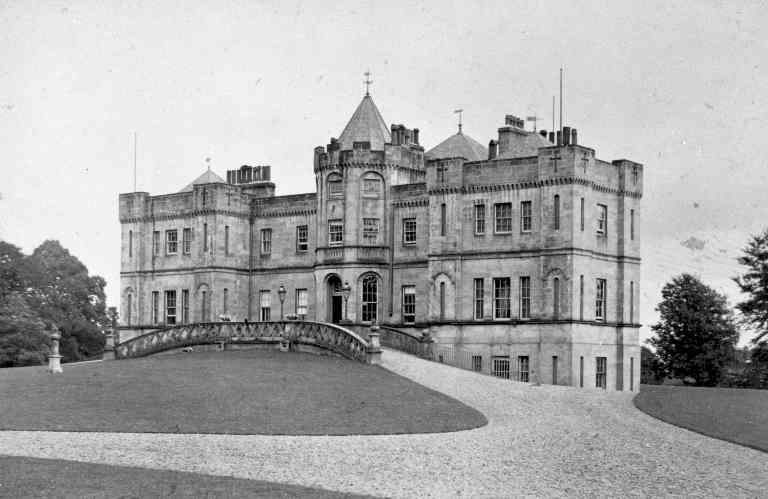
Airthrey Castle from the north-west, circa 1885, the original design in the era of the Abercrombies

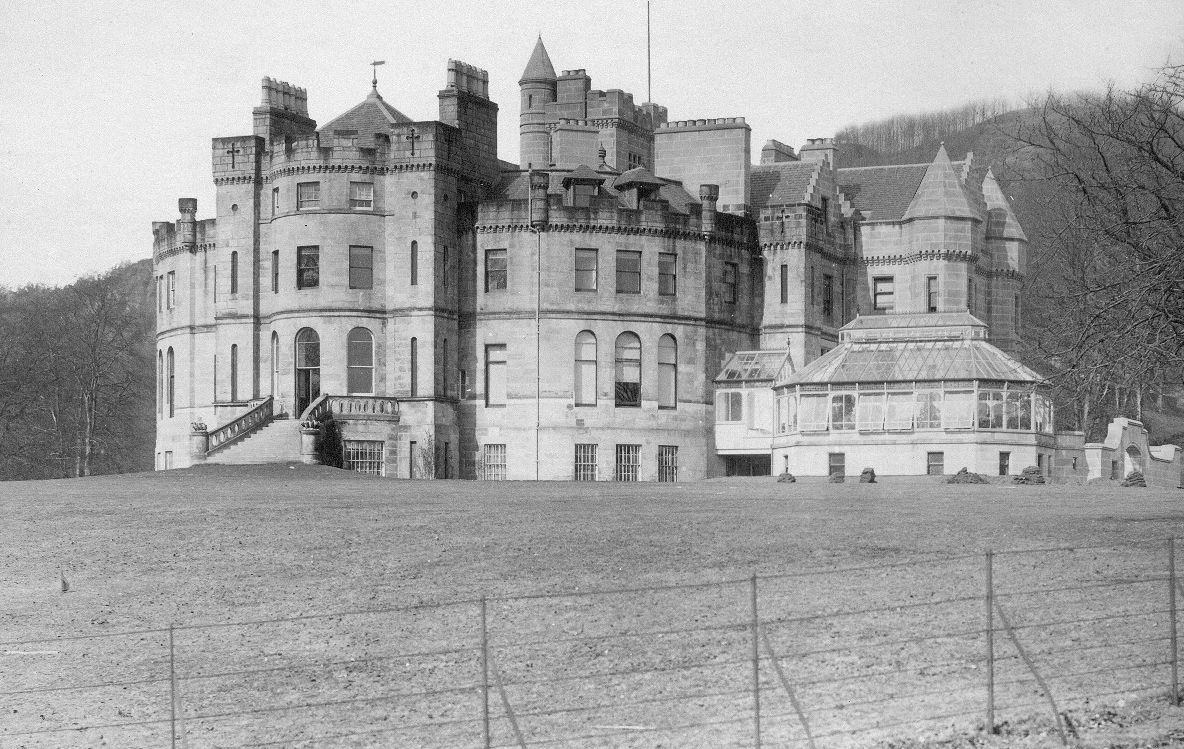
Airthrey Castle from the south-east, circa 1899, remodelled in Scottish Baronial style by Donald Graham

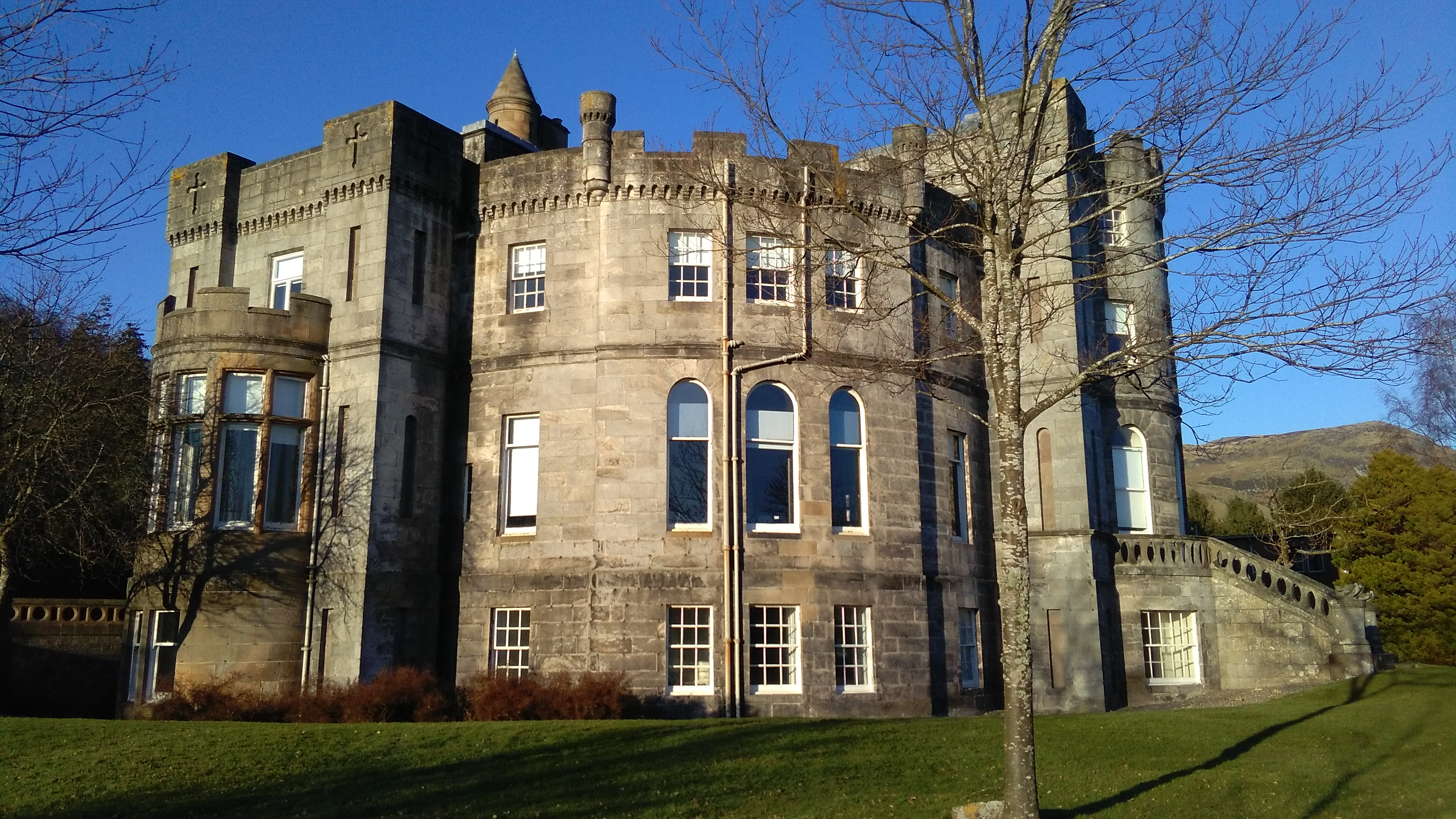
Airthrey Castle from the west, today

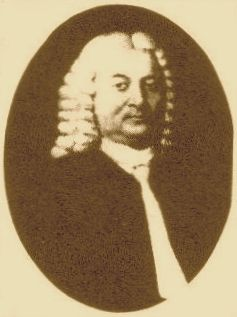
John Dundas of Manour, builder of "small, snug" Aithrey House in 1747

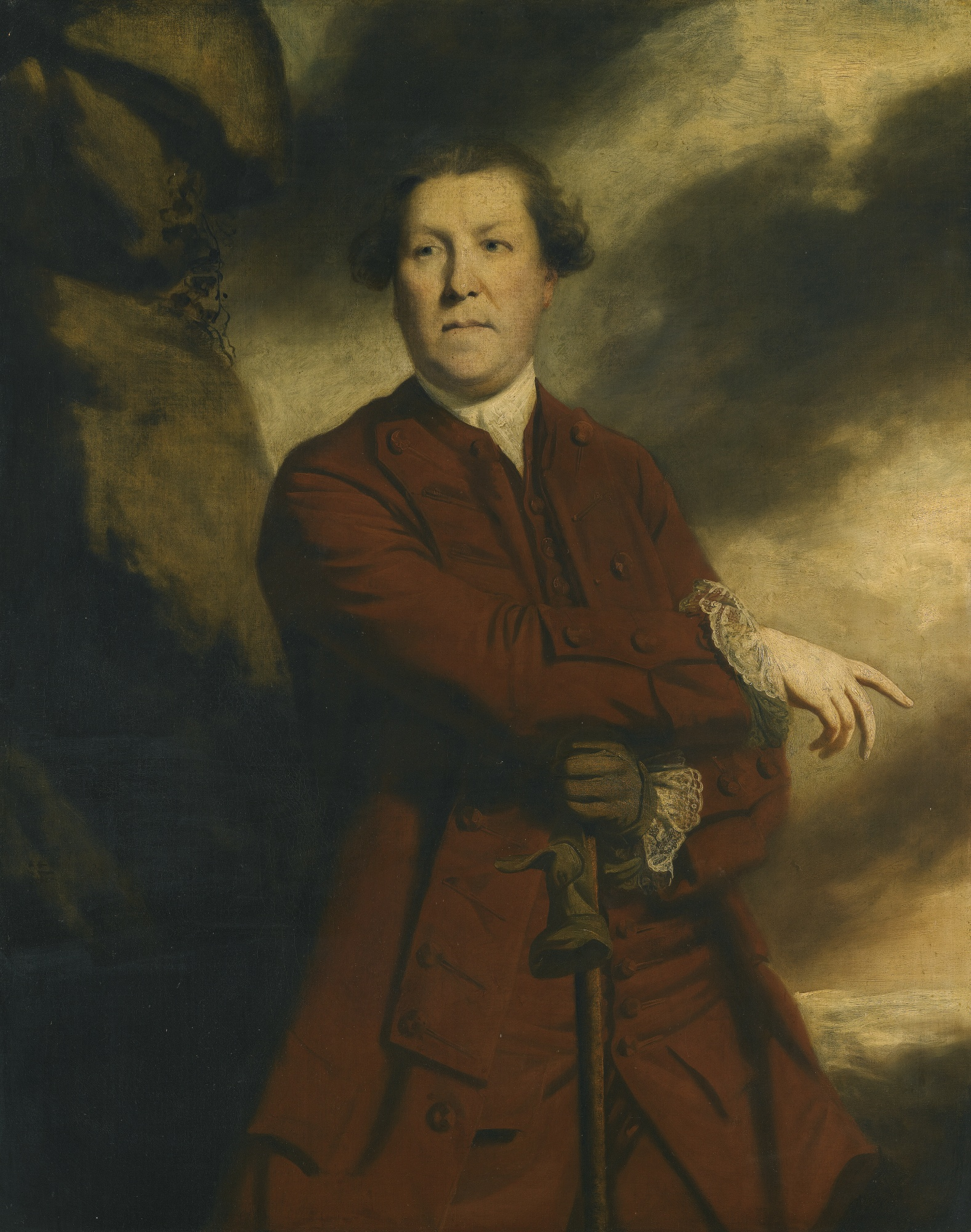
Captain Robert Haldane, who acquired the estate in 1759

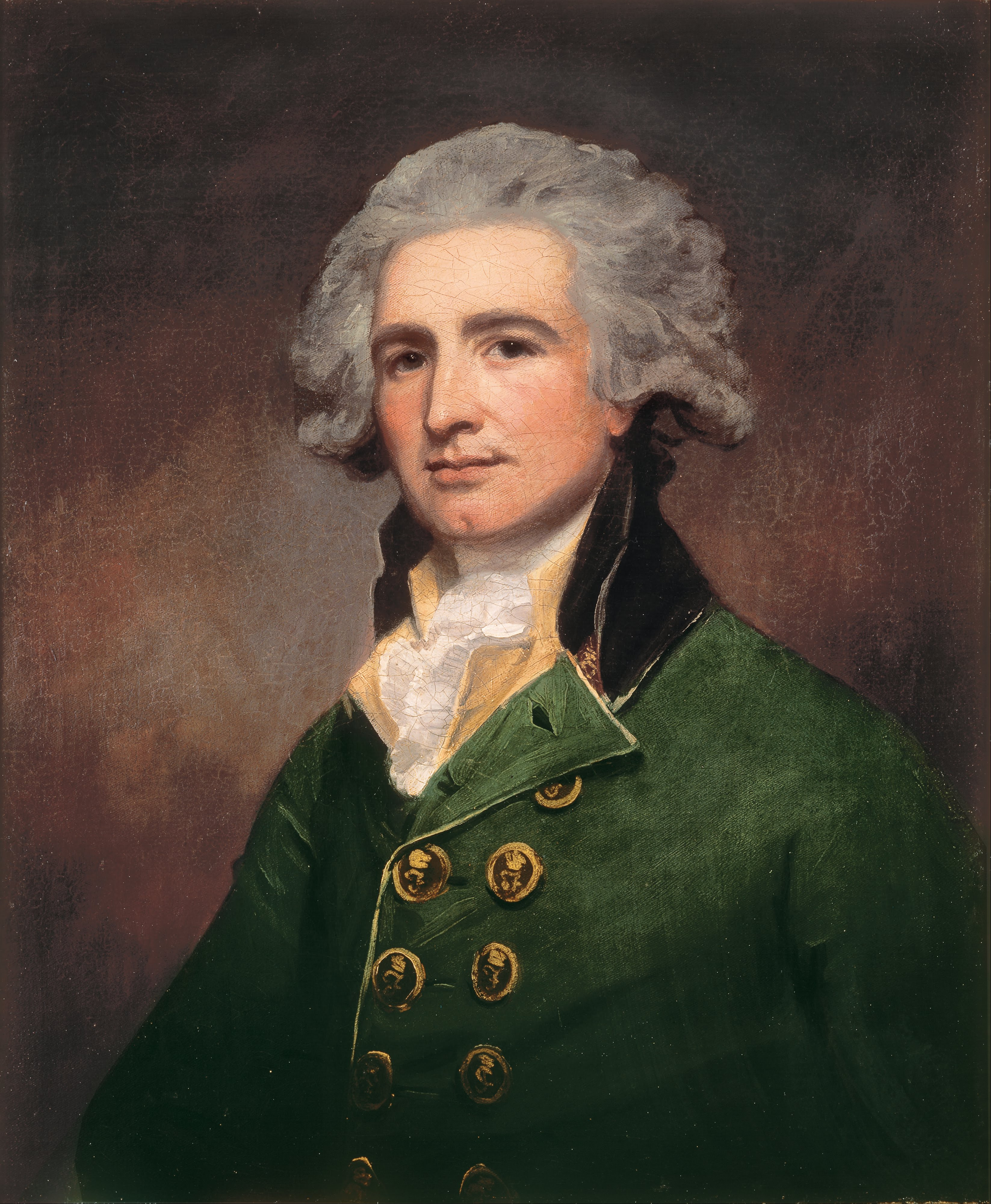
Sir Robert Abercromby, who acquired Airthrey Castle in 1798

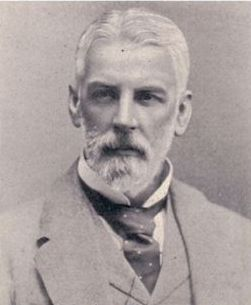
Donald Graham, who acquired the Airthrey estate in 1889

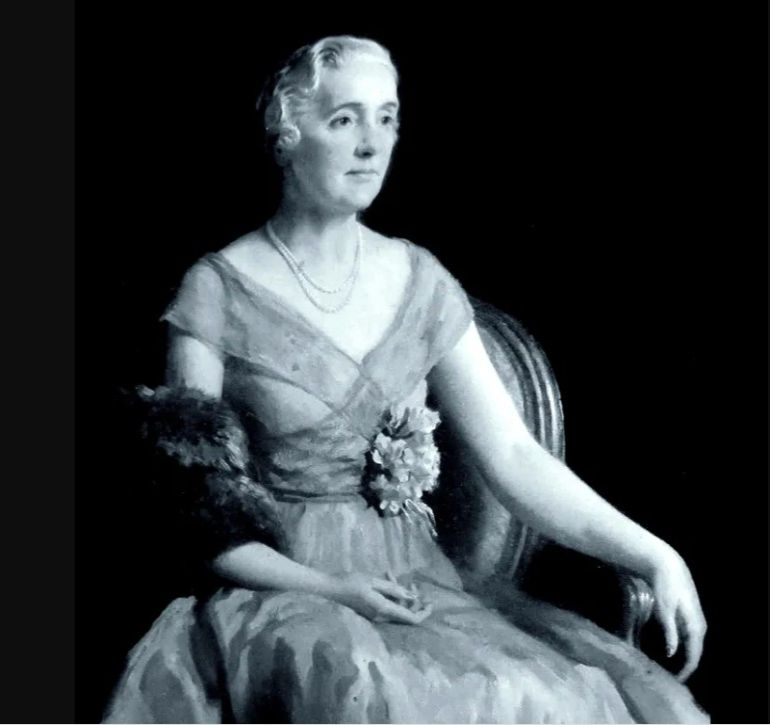
Grace Donaldson MBE, the last private resident of Airthrey Castle.

Airthrey Castle is a historic building and estate which now forms part of the buildings and grounds of the University of Stirling in central Scotland. The 18th-century building with 19th-century additions occupies a beautiful setting in landscaped grounds in the southern edge of the Ochil Hills, above the Forth valley. It is located close to Bridge of Allan, two miles from the historic city of Stirling.

== Name ==
There are several suggested origins of the name "Airthrey". One is that it is a corruption of Ard-rhedadie (a high or ascending road, referring to the old road which leads through it to Sheriffmuir). It could alternatively come from the Gaelic "Aithrin" – "a sharp point" or "conflict". This could refer to a battle fought near the site of the Castle in 839, when the Picts were defeated by the Scots under Kenneth McAlpine (standing stones in the park to the east of the Castle are reputed to commemorate the battle). Another, Brythonic rather than Gaelic, version sees the name as related to that of Airdrie in Lanarkshire, and parallel to the modern Welsh ard tref or "high steading or farmstead".

== History ==
Early references suggest that in medieval times the lands of Airthrey belonged to the Monks of Cambus, Kenneth & Dunfermline. The name Aithrey appears in a charter of King David I, thought to be from before 1146. In 1370, the estate was granted to Sir John Herice, Keeper of the nearby Stirling Castle. Then the land passed to William Graham, 3rd Lord Graham. He came into ownership of "the lands of Athra", probably in 1472. He was created Earl of Montrose in 1504 but died at the Battle of Flodden in 1513. The estate remained in the ownership of members of the Clan Graham down to James Graham, 1st Marquess of Montrose, who fought a famous campaign in support of King Charles I from 1644 to 1650. In 1630 Montrose transferred the Airthrey Estate to a cadet branch of the family, the Grahams of Braco. In 1645, the manor house at Aithrey was burned to the ground by Montrose's implacable foe, the covenanting Archibald Campbell, 1st Marquess of Argyll (1598–1661), reputedly in reprisal for an attack on Argyll's own estate at nearby Castle Campbell by Montrose's followers, en route to victory at the Battle of Kilsyth. The Marquess of Montrose was executed on the orders of the Scottish Parliament in 1650 (during the Commonwealth period). In 1660 the estate passed from the Grahams of Braco to Sir Henry Stirling of Ardoch, and in 1670 his son Sir William Stirling is recorded as being in possession of ‘villa et terris de Athrie’.

The Hopes of Hopetoun

In 1678, the estate was purchased by John Hope of Hopetoun, sheriff and shire commissioner for Linlithgow, and son of James Hope of Hopetoun. The Hope family had profitable interests in lead mines in the Lowther Hills in the Southern Uplands. John Hope died four years later in 1682, drowned on the frigate HMS Gloucester, which struck a sandbank off Great Yarmouth, carrying a distinguished company which included the Duke of York (the future King James II) and John Churchill (the future Duke of Marlborough). John Hope reputedly gave up his place on the rescue vessel to the Duke of York. He was succeeded by his infant son Charles Hope, 1st Earl of Hopetoun (1681–1742) who after attaining his majority was elevated by Queen Anne to the House of Lords in 1703 with the titles of Viscount Airthrie, Baron Hope and Earl of Hopetoun in the Peerage of Scotland, reputedly in gratitude for his father saving the life of her father King James II. The Hopes may well not have lived at the as yet modest house at Airthrey; they owned extensive property and in 1699 they built the palatial Hopetoun House, 30 miles away at Queensferry.

Dundas of Manour

In 1706 the Airthrey estate was bought by Ralph Dundas of Manour (or Manor), son of John Dundas of Manour (1641–1711). A later legend suggests a canny deal between Dundas and the Earl of Hopetoun. "John Dundas owned a property called Stang Hill Tower which was on the edge of the Earl of Hopetoun's estate. For many years the Earl tried to obtain the tower from John Dundas to add to his estate, but John Dundas refused all offers to let it go, despite the threat of law suits and even bribery. Finally on his death bed he told his son "It is foolish forever to struggle against our rich and powerful neighbour. He will, sooner or later, have our little property; make the best terms with him you can". Soon after John Dundas' death, an exchange highly advantageous to the Dundas of Manour was effected. Stang Hill Tower being given to Lord Hopetoun and the estate of Aithrey which belonged to Lord Hopetoun being made over to Ralph Dundas" (1675–1729). In 1747 John Dundas of Manour (1701–1780) (grandson of the John Dundas in the legend) rebuilt Airthrey House for himself and his family (including his son General Ralph Dundas, 1730–1814). His niece's husband, the writer John Ramsay of Ochtertyre (1736–1814), later described the house he built as "a small, snug house" and says that "conscious of his ignorance of country affairs", John Dundas "contented himself while there with making a kitchen-garden, and having a few acres in grass, without any corn, or adding to his father’s small enclosures. He spent his time … among his books". Ramsay wrote a description of John Dundas. "His candour, meekness, and benevolence, his piety and spotless morals, commanded the esteem of all that knew him; whilst his cheerful sweet disposition, joined to a great fund of anecdote, rendered him an agreeable instructive companion. He unhappily dipped too deep into polemical divinity, which, though it did not abate his charity towards those who were of a different opinion, exposed him in the decline of his faculties to the snares of Popish emissaries."

Aithrey then passed through the hands of three families in succession whose fortunes had been made in India.

The Haldanes

In 1759, "from want of relish for a country life" John Dundas sold "this sweet place" to Captain Robert Haldane of Gleneagles and Plean, an extremely wealthy nabob, and sometime Member of Parliament. "He returned home from the sea service of the East India Company with a great fortune" and was "an arrogant, ambitious, purse-proud man". "He conceived to himself the fashionable modern fancy of beautifying his place in an elegant manner, and considered it as an essential requisite to get quit of these roads which intersected his ground in an ugly and inconvenient manner; and, amongst others, he was not a little hurt with the idea of one passing hard by the door of his house; a situation which, whether really incommodious in itself or not, it is well-known no person chooses to put up with if he can possibly avoid it." Haldane built a new road at his own expense and placed gates on the old public roads.

On Captain Haldane's death the estate passed to his nephew, Captain James Haldane, and in due course, in 1768, to James's infant son Robert Haldane (1764-1842). It was this second Robert Haldane who went on to build a grand new house on the estate in 1791, naming it Airthrey Castle. It was built to a 'castellated villa' design by the pre-eminent Scottish neo-classical architect Robert Adam. Haldane, however, tried to skimp on the architect's fees for supervising the buildings work and Adam retired from the commission before the Castle was actually constructed, leaving the surveying of the building work to the mason, Thomas Russell of Edinburgh. Adam's designs cost £37.6s.2d, and the building work £3,755.13s. Haldane also had the 363-acre (1.47 km^{2}) grounds landscaped to designs by Thomas White of Durham, a student of Capability Brown. The works included the beautiful, man-made 23-acre loch (later much used for curling), a hermitage (of which the ruins remain, in Hermitage Wood), and a 4-mile boundary wall. Haldane is said to have advertised locally for a full-time hermit to live in the hermitage, and to have received one serious applicant, who later changed his mind. It is also said that Haldane nearly drowned in Airthrey Loch, but was saved by a man called Sandy Morrison, a shoemaker, to whom in gratitude he gave the use of one of the lodges and a pension for life.

Remarkably, shortly after his vast investment in the house and estate, Robert Haldane had an epiphany and resolved to divest himself of his estates and devote himself to evangelical work. Refused permission by the East India Company to invest all in an ambitious mission in Bengal, he proceeded instead to build a number of churches and seminaries in Scotland, fund the training of numerous missionaries, lead a theological revival in Geneva, and become the founder of Scottish Congregationalism. He was joined in these worthy activities by his younger brother James Haldane.

The Abercrombies

Robert Haldane sold the Airthrey estate in 1798 to his sister-in-law's uncle, General Sir Robert Abercromby, a distinguished soldier whose military career had been pursued in America (in the War of Independence) and in India, and who had been Governor of Bombay. Coincidentally, his mother was daughter of Ralph Dundas of Manour, the family who had sold the estate to the Haldanes. Abercromby's considerable fortune derived from prize money: he "realized a handsome fortune whilst fighting the battles of the East India Company in Hindostan".

There were springs on the Airthrey estate which emerged from the site of a disused copper mine. The medicinal qualities of the spring water had been known to locals since at least the mid-18th century (indeed, cattle and sheep which drank from a particular drinking trough were said always to arrive at market in much better condition), and in the 1820s Abercromby had the qualities of the water scientifically analysed by the Professor of Chemistry at the University of Glasgow. He confirmed their exceptionally high mineral content and medicinal qualities. On the back of this, Abercromby (by now in his eighties) decided to make the waters available for the public good, and invested in a properly engineered well-head to secure the source. When the scientific report was published, "the Airthrey waters" became famous and people soon came in large numbers to take them. Herein lay the origins of adjoining Bridge of Allan as a spa town: it was transformed from a "sequestered retreat of rural life" to "a favoured resort of elegance and fashion", with the springs one of the highest quality in Great Britain. ‘A silent, modest, sensible man’, Abercromby died at Airthrey in 1827 aged 87, by when he was the oldest general in the British army. He was succeeded by his nephew (1770–1843), a lawyer, member of parliament and Lord Lieutenant of Stirlingshire, who was succeeded by George Abercromby, 3rd Baron Abercromby (1800–1852), a soldier, member of parliament and Lord Lieutenant of Clackmannanshire, who was in turn succeeded by his son George Abercromby, 4th Baron Abercromby (1838–1917).

The Grahams

The Abercrombies owned Airthrey for just over 100 years. In 1889 George Abercromby, 4th Baron Abercromby sold the Airthrey estate (3,100 acres in all) to Donald Graham, a prosperous Glasgow merchant, for £75,000. Donald Graham was a partner in William Graham & Co, a business built on the India trade, and spent many years in Bombay. One limb of the business was the famous port shipper W & J Graham. Donald Graham was a Justice of the Peace for the Counties of Lanark and Stirling, and Deputy Lieutenant for the County of Stirling and County of Glasgow. He also served a term as Lord Dean of Guild for Glasgow, was a director of the Union Bank of Scotland, and was a member of Stirling County Council. He is also thought to have been an early investor in and director of the oil business which became Shell, and one long-standing theory is that the famous Shell logo is ultimately derived from the scallop shell in the clan Graham coat of arms. He was also a distant kinsman of the Grahams who had lived at Airthrey until 1678. Donald Graham constructed a large addition to the castle in 1889–91, remodelling the north facade in a late Scots Baronial style. The original Robert Adam design survives largely intact on the south side of the building, facing the gardens and loch. The Graham coat of arms can still be found in the stained glass window in the main entrance. During this period Aithrey Loch was popular with curlers and ice skaters, until an accident in 1901 which killed Frederick Pullar, a young surveyor noted for his part in a bathymetric survey of Scottish lochs, together with the lady he was attempting to rescue. After this tragic event Airthrey Castle Curling Club (founded 1878) only used the loch once more, in the cold winter of 1979. Donald Graham died in 1901 after his carriage overturned on the drive at Airthrey and he caught pneumonia (his ornate monument is at neighbouring Logie Old Kirk). The estate passed to his widow Clara Graham, who in 1924 leased Airthrey Castle to the Glasgow shipping magnate Charles Donaldson, Chairman of the Donaldson Line group of shipping companies, who died at Airthrey in 1938.

Hospital

With the outbreak of the Second World War, in 1939 Airthrey Castle became an emergency maternity hospital, under the emergency evacuation scheme. Mrs Charles Donaldson (the castle's last private resident) helped to establish it. "Bedrooms were cleared, the Billiard Room and Gun Room were dismantled, a large bedroom became the Delivery Room, and the adjacent bathroom had planks laid along the bath to act as an examining couch, the planks being removed for a bath". The maternity hospital at this stage had only 25 beds, but it nonetheless didn't reach full occupancy until a rush of evacuees following the 1941 Clydebank Blitz. Some of the evacuee babies were christened 'Airthrey' to remind them of their place of birth. After the Donaldsons' lease expired in 1941, the Graham family leased Airthrey Castle to Stirling County Council for several years (the rent for the castle, garden and policies being £320, with "shooting excluded and no disturbance to be caused"). As for the early nurses' experience, "the long unlit drive along the loch from the main road was scary in the dark. Two cottages were renovated for nurses and were reasonably comfortable, but approached by tree-shaded paths, they were seasonably infested by migrations of small frogs and were peculiarly squelchy underfoot in the dark. Skating on the frozen loch was at first considered safe if the shepherd's dog frolicked on the ice, until the gamekeeper's labrador fell through".

In 1947 the Grahams sold the Airthrey estate to developers, finally ending its period of private ownership. The particulars of sale described the estate as follows. "The property extends to upwards of 2900 acres, of which 300 acres are within the Policies, including Airthrey Loch (25 acres), grass parks and woodlands, all enclosed by a substantial wall, ensuring privacy; 150 acres are carse land situated to the west of the Stirling-Bridge of Allan Road, and the remainder comprises arable land, grazings, moorland and woodlands, mainly situated on the south and west slopes of the Ochil Hills and rising to and altitude of about 1000 feet. The Castle is pleasantly situated on ground rising to about 150 feet overlooking the Loch and Parks, and has extensive views in all directions. The principal entrance is at the West Lodge on the Stirling- Bridge of Allan Road, and there is also an entrance by the East Lodge on the Stirling-Alva Road. The policy grounds are laid out with mature timber, rhododendrons (which are a feature in their season) etc., while the Loch with its trout fishing is an added attraction." The house and its immediate environs was bought by Stirling County Council, who leased it to the National Health Service. Airthrey Castle continued to be used as a maternity hospital until 1969, supplementing the needs of Stirling Royal Infirmary. An illustrated history of the hospital can be found on YouTube.

== University of Stirling ==
In the 1960s, as a result of the Robbins Report, the estate was selected as the site of the first completely new Scottish university since the University of Edinburgh was established in 1582. One contributing factor in the selection of Stirling over other prospective university towns was the beautiful site available at Airthrey. The University of Stirling opened in 1967. Its campus is located in 60 acres (240,000 m^{2}) of woodland, 300 acres (1.2 km^{2}) of mature landscaped parkland, a loch with an abundance of wildlife – and incorporates Airthrey Castle. In 2014 Airthrey Castle became home to the University's international study centre, operated in partnership with INTO University Partnerships.

== Tennis Scotland ==
The castle is currently the headquarters of Tennis Scotland the governing body of tennis in Scotland.

== Listed building ==
Aithrey Castle retains many original features and is a category B listed building.

== Gallery ==
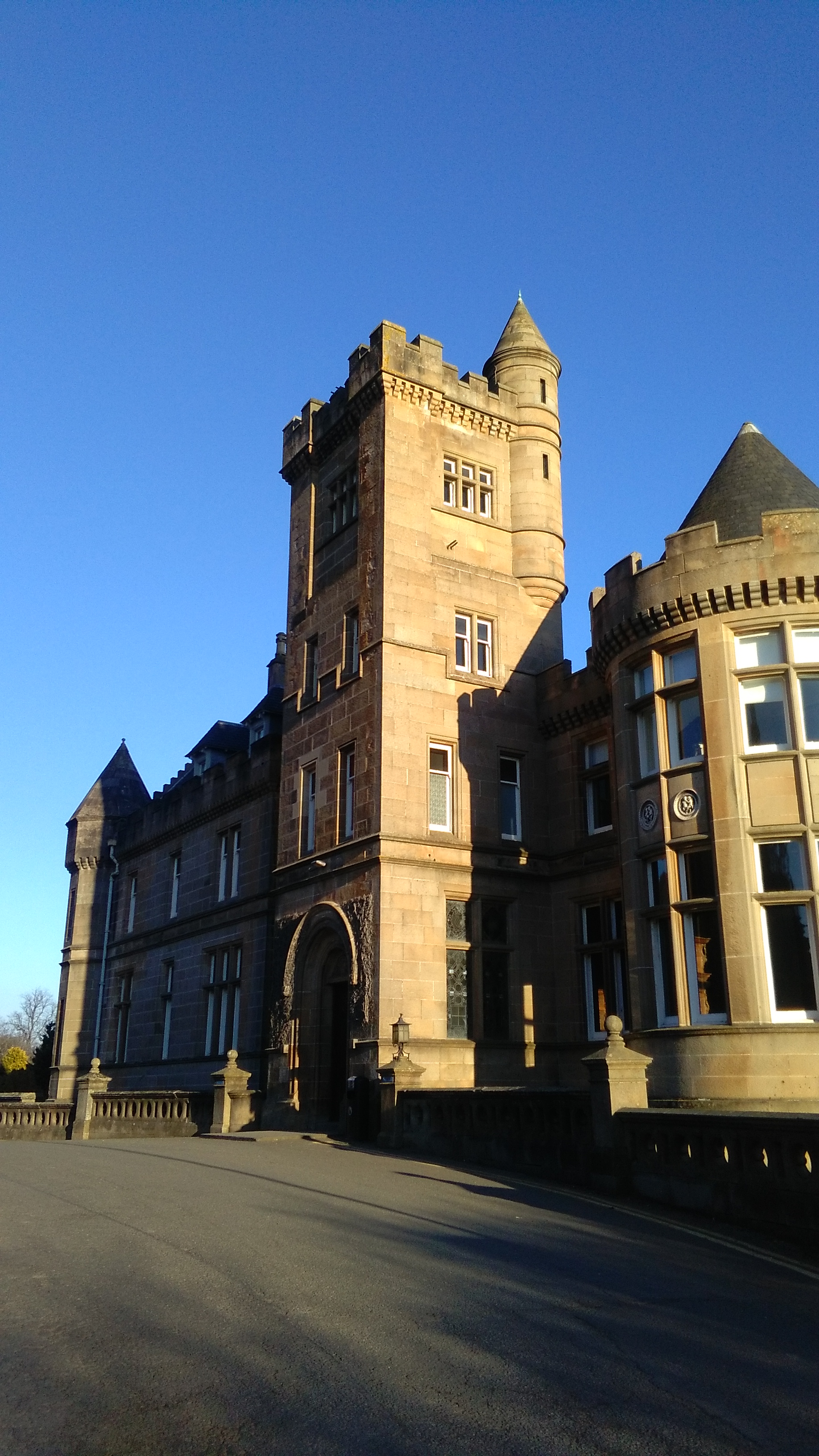
Airthrey Castle from north-west; Scots Baronial additions by Donald Graham, c.1890

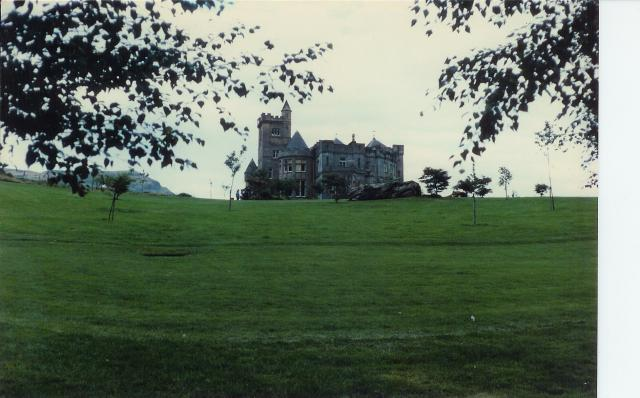
Airthrey Castle. At the eastern end of the campus of Stirling University

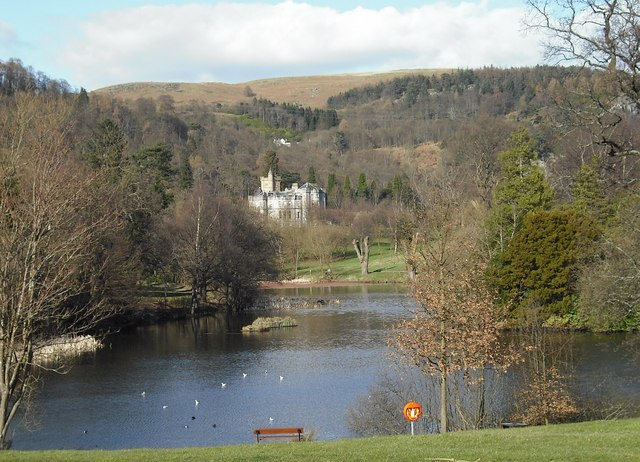
Airthrey Castle
