= 75th (Stirlingshire) Regiment of Foot =

- Active: 1787–1881
- Country: Kingdom of Great Britain (1787–1800); United Kingdom (1801–1881)
- Branch: British Army
- Type: Infantry
- Size: One battalion
- Garrison/HQ: Dorchester Barracks
- Engagements: Third Anglo-Mysore War; Fourth Anglo-Mysore War; Second Anglo-Maratha War; Napoleonic Wars; Indian Rebellion

The 75th (Stirlingshire) Regiment of Foot, was a British Army line infantry regiment, raised in 1787. Under the Childers Reforms it amalgamated with the 92nd (Gordon Highlanders) Regiment of Foot to form the Gordon Highlanders in 1881.

== History ==
=== Formation ===
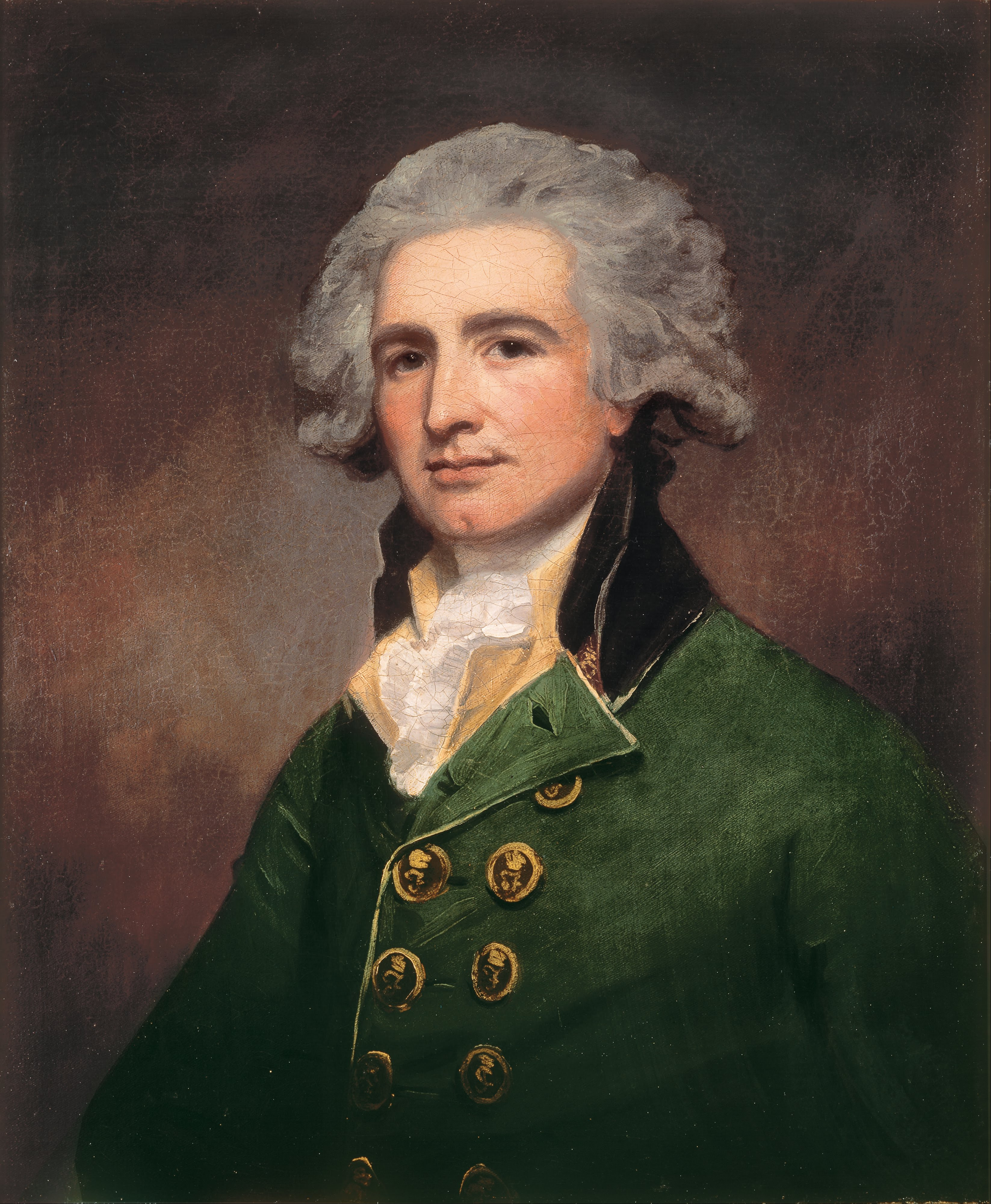
Colonel Robert Abercromby, founder of the regiment, by George Romney

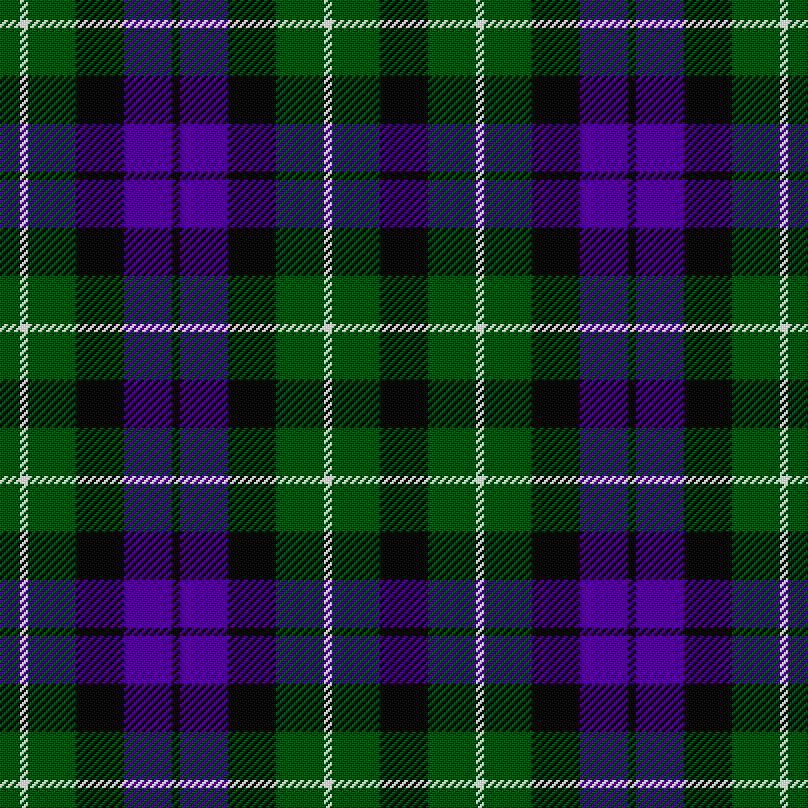
The probable tartan of the regiment

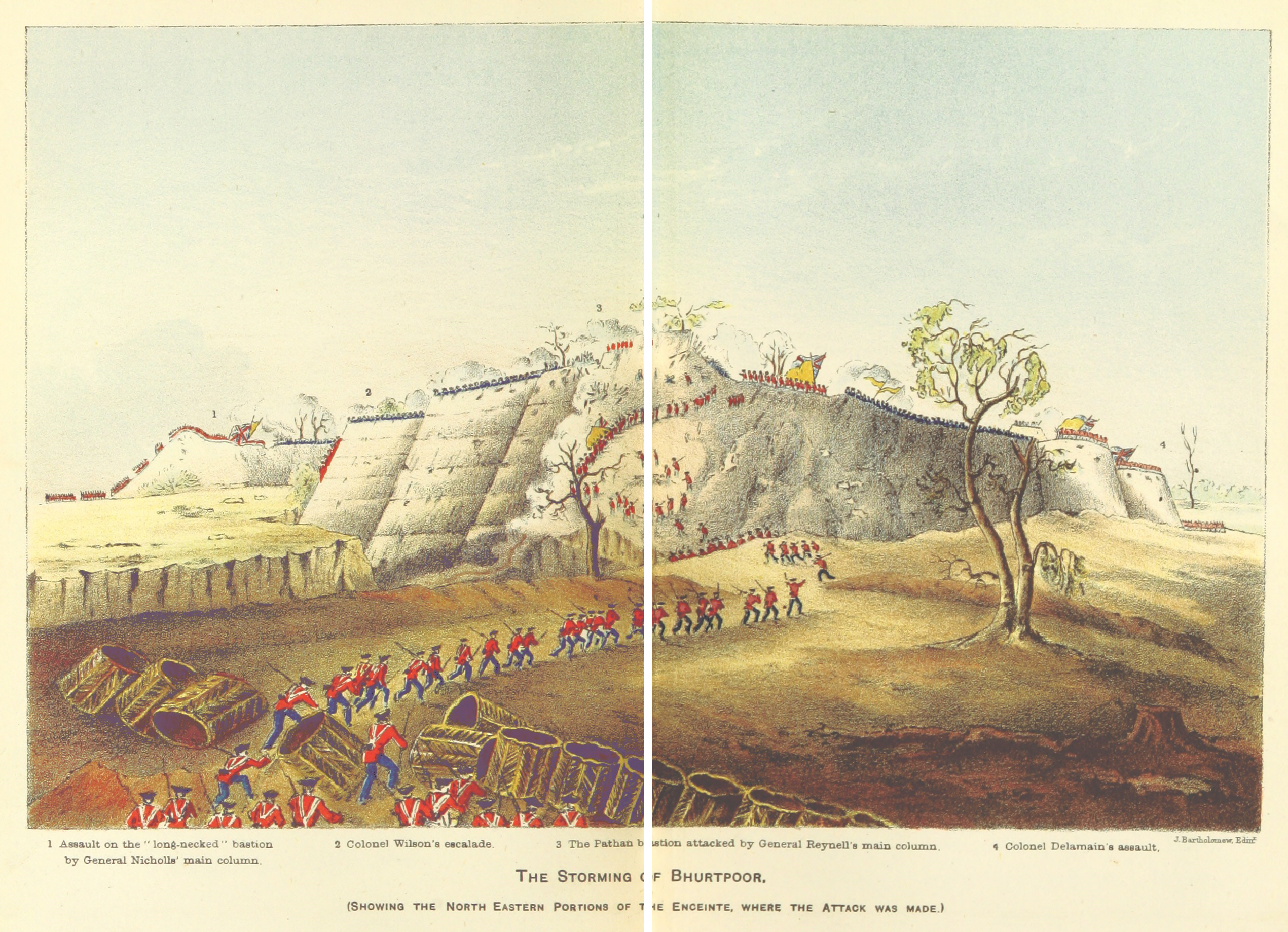
The siege of Bharatpur in January 1805

The regiment was raised in Stirling by Colonel Robert Abercromby for service in India as the 75th (Highland) Regiment of Foot in October 1787. In accordance with the Declaratory Act 1788 the cost of raising the regiment was recharged to East India Company on the basis that the act required that expenses "should be defrayed out of the revenues" arising there. First assembled in June 1788, the regiment proceeded to England and embarked for India arriving there by the end of the year. It saw action at the siege of Seringapatam in February 1792 during the Third Anglo-Mysore War. It went on to fight at the Battle of Seedaseer in March 1799 and formed part of the storming party at the siege of Seringapatam in April 1799 during the Fourth Anglo-Mysore War. It also took part in the siege of Bharatpur in January 1805 during the Second Anglo-Maratha War. It then returned home in August 1806 and then lost its Highland status due to recruiting difficulties, becoming the 75th Regiment of Foot in April 1809.

=== Napoleonic Wars ===
The regiment embarked for Jersey in June 1811 and was deployed to Messina in Sicily in October 1811. Internal dissensions in the Sicilian government and an ever-increasing suspicion that Queen Maria Carolina was aiming to have the French reinstate her in Sicily had led to Lord William Bentinck's appointment as British representative to the Court of Palermo in July 1811. Bentinck established a new constitution under which the Sicilians gained an autonomy they had never experienced before. The constitution set up the separation of the legislative and executive powers and abolished the feudalistic practices that had been established and recognised for the past 700 years. Bentinck went on to lead an Anglo-Sicilian force, involving the regiment, which raided the Calabrian coast in February 1813. The regiment transferred to the Ionian Islands in July 1814 and to Gibraltar in 1821 before returning to England in 1823.

=== The Victorian era ===
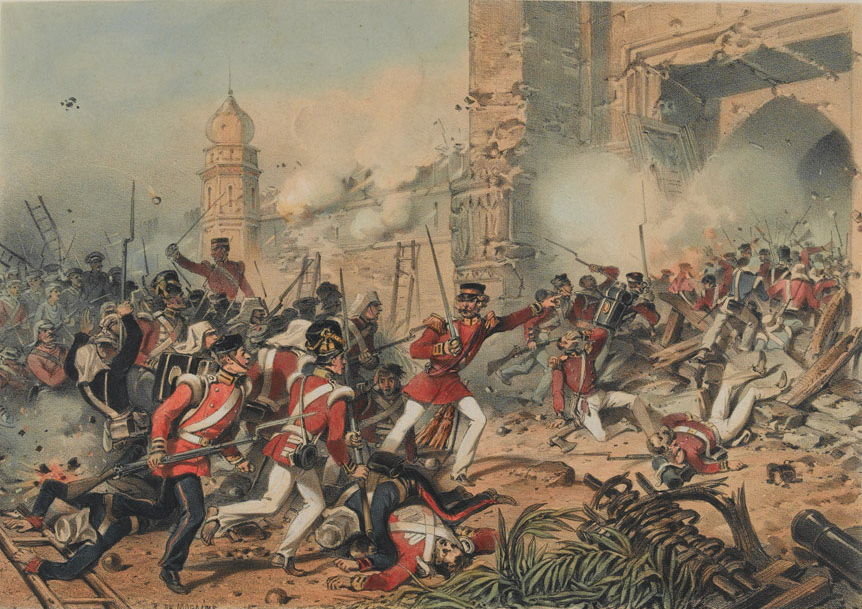
The Capture of Delhi, 1857

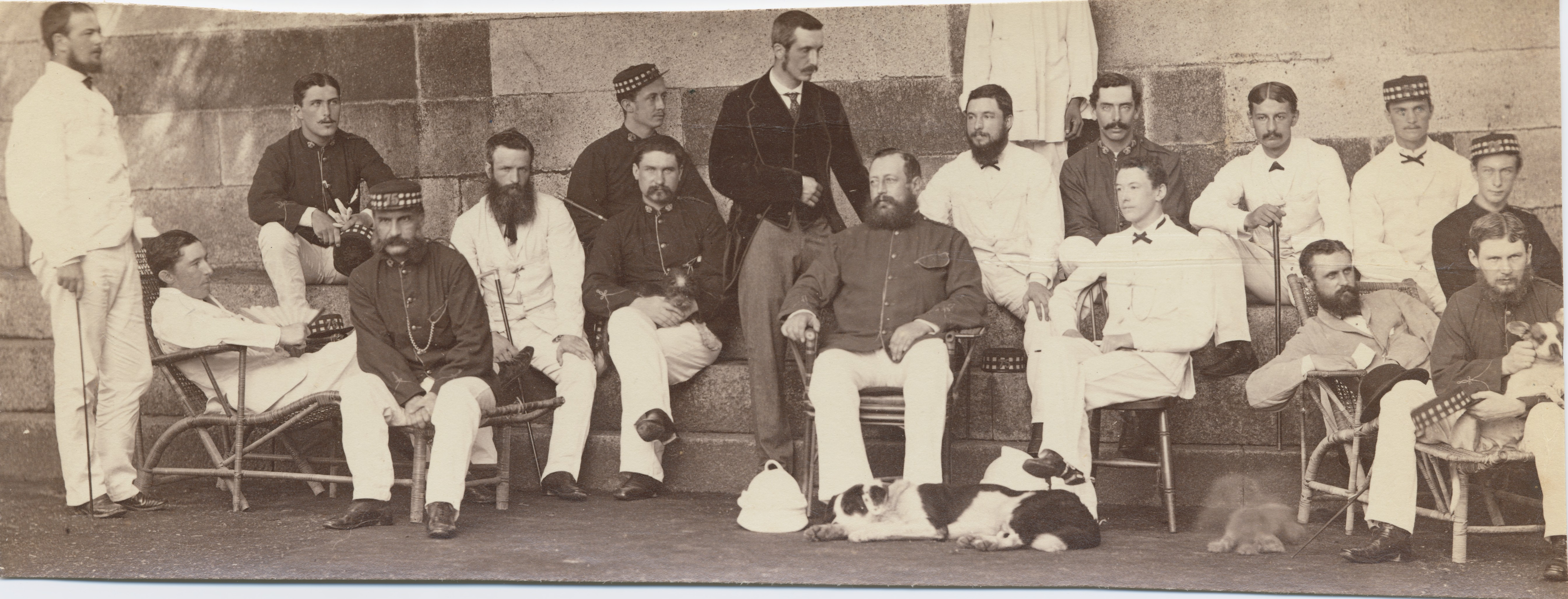
Officers of the 75th Regiment of Foot in Hong Kong, 1869

The regiment embarked for the Cape Colony in 1830 and took part in the Sixth Xhosa War in December 1834. It returned home in 1843 and then embarked for India again in 1849. The regiment, as part of the first storming column, led a bayonet charge at the siege of Delhi in June 1857 during efforts to suppress the Indian Rebellion. It was also engaged at the siege of Lucknow in November 1857 and formed the funeral party for Major-General Sir Henry Havelock later that month before going on to take part in the Capture of Lucknow in March 1858.

The regiment returned home in 1862 and was renamed the 75th (Stirlingshire) Regiment of Foot later in November 1862. It was deployed to Gibraltar again in 1867, to Hong Kong in 1868 and to Singapore in 1869 before returning to the Cape Colony in 1870. It returned home again in 1875.

As part of the Cardwell Reforms of the 1870s, where single-battalion regiments were linked together to share a single depot and recruiting district in the United Kingdom, the 75th was linked with the 39th (Dorsetshire) Regiment of Foot, and assigned to district no. 39 at Dorchester Barracks in Dorchester. On 1 July 1881 the Childers Reforms came into effect and the regiment amalgamated with the 92nd (Gordon Highlanders) Regiment of Foot to become the 1st battalion, the Gordon Highlanders.

== Battle honours ==
Battle honours won by the regiment were:

- Fourth Anglo-Mysore War: Seringapatam, India
- Indian Mutiny: Delhi 1857, Lucknow

== Victoria Cross recipients ==
- Colour Sergeant Cornelius Coughlan, Indian Mutiny (8 June 1857)
- Private Patrick Green, Indian Mutiny (11 September 1857)
- Lieutenant Richard Wadeson, Indian Mutiny (17 July 1857)

== Colonels of the Regiment ==
Colonels of the Regiment were:

=== 75th (Highland) Regiment of Foot ===
- 1787–1827: Gen. Sir Robert Abercromby of Airthrey, GCB

=== 75th Regiment of Foot – (1809) ===
- 1827–1832: Lt-Gen. James Dunlop of Dunlop
- 1832–1841: Lt-Gen. Sir Joseph Fuller, GCH
- 1841–1845: Gen. Sir William Hutchinson, KCH
- 1845–1858: Gen. Sackville Hamilton Berkeley
- 1858–1870: Gen. St. John Augustus Clerke, KH

=== 75th (Stirlingshire) Regiment of Foot – (1862) ===
- 1870–1872: Gen. Sir David Russell, KCB
- 1872–1881: Gen. John Thomas Hill (to 1st Battalion, Gordon Highlanders)
- 1881: amalgamated with the 92nd (Gordon Highlanders) Regiment of Foot to form the Gordon Highlanders

== Sources ==
- Leask, Anthony (2006). Sword of Scotland: 'Our Fighting Jocks'. Pen and Sword. ISBN 978-1844154050.
- Reid, Stuart; Fosten, Bryan (1992). Wellington's Highlanders. Osprey. ISBN 978-1855322561.
- Stewart, David (1825). Sketches of the Character, Manners, and Present State of the Highlanders of Scotland: With Details of the Military Service of the Highland Regiments. Vol. 2. Constable.
- Theal, George McCall (2010). History of South Africa Since September 1795. Cambridge University Press. ISBN 978-1108023634.
