= John Abercromby (British Army officer) =

British Army officer and politician (1772–1817)

Lieutenant-General Sir John Abercromby GCB
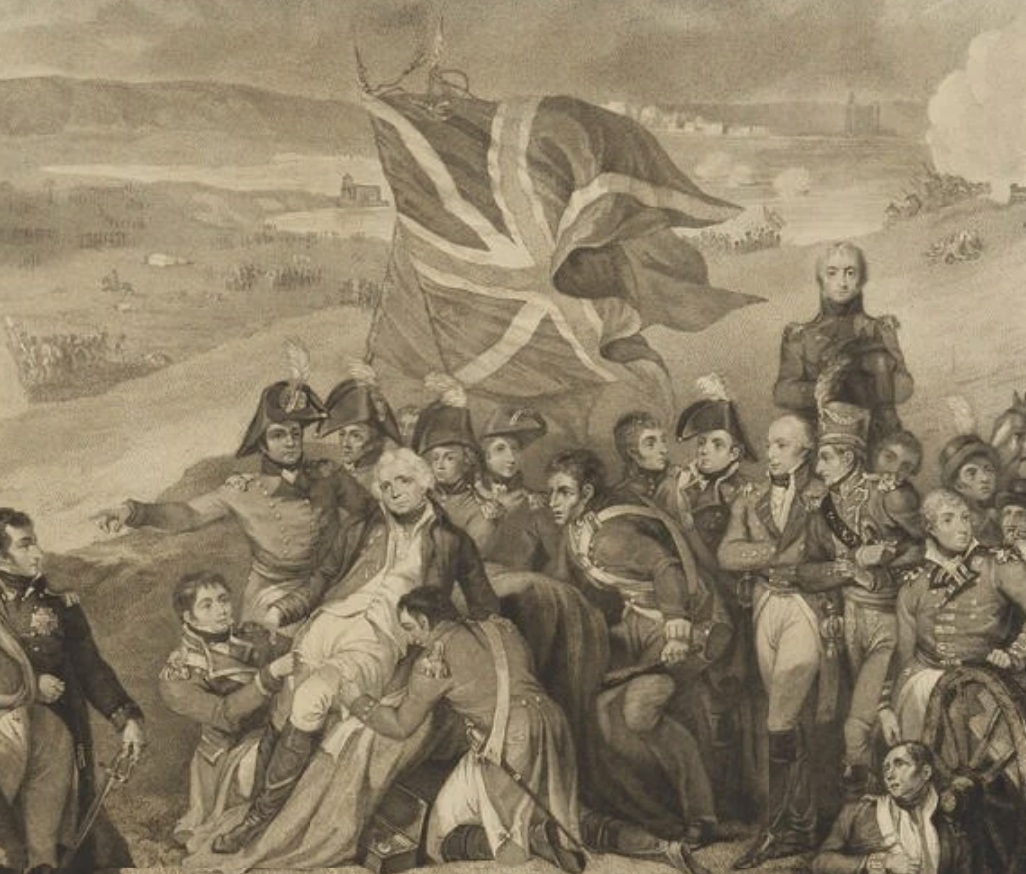
- Abercromby (pointing) at the Battle at Alexandria
- Born: 2 April 1772
- Died: 14 February 1817 (aged 44)
- Military career
- Allegiance: Great Britain; United Kingdom
- Service years: 1782–1817
- Rank: Lieutenant-general
- Commands: Bombay Army; Madras Army
- Conflicts: Napoleonic Wars
- Awards: Knight Grand Cross of the Order of the Bath

Lieutenant-General Sir John Abercromby, GCB (2 April 1772 – 14 February 1817) was a British Army officer and politician who represented Clackmannanshire in the House of Commons of the United Kingdom from 1815 to 1817.

== Family and early life ==
John Abercromby was born the son of Lt.-Gen. Sir Ralph Abercromby and Mary Abercromby, 1st Baroness Abercromby. He had an elder brother George, who was born in 1770, and two younger brothers, of whom James was born in 1776 and Alexander in 1784. Abercromby also had three sisters, Anne, Mary, and Catherine.

== Career ==
=== 1782–1802 ===
Abercromby entered the army in 1782 as a cornet in the 4th Dragoons, transferring in 1786 as an ensign to the 75th Highland Regiment. He gained promotion to lieutenant in 1787, and to captain in 1792. He subsequently served as an ADC to his father during campaigns in Flanders (1793–1794), the West Indies (1796–1797), Ireland (1798) and against the Batavian Republic (1799). Promoted to colonel in 1800, he left his father's staff, but became deputy adjutant general and served under General Hutchinson in the force led by his father to Egypt (1801). His father died at the Battle at Alexandria; but John continued to render admirable service, for which General Hutchinson commended him.

=== 1803–1817 ===
When war broke out anew in 1803 the French detained Abercromby whilst he was travelling in France and imprisoned him at Verdun for the next five years. During his captivity he received promotion to major-general in 1805 and the appointment for life as colonel of the 53rd Regiment of Foot in 1807. Exchanged in 1808 for General Brenier, he became Commander-in-Chief of the Bombay Army in 1809. From there he led the forces that captured Mauritius in 1810, returning to Bombay in 1811.

In 1813, he transferred to become Commander-in-Chief of the Madras Army and temporary acting Governor of Madras, with promotion to lieutenant-general. The Indian climate had broken his health, however, and he had to return to Britain at the end of 1813, where he was appointed Knight Commander of the Order of the Bath.

He was elevated to Knight Grand Cross of the Order of the Bath in 1815, and succeeded his elder brother George as Member of Parliament (MP) for Clackmannanshire. However, his worsening health drove him to the Continent, and he died in Marseille in 1817.

== See also ==
- Records of members of parliament of the United Kingdom

Military offices
Preceded by Oliver Nicolls	C-in-C, Bombay Army; 1809–1813	Succeeded by Sir Miles Nightingall
Preceded by Sir Samuel Auchmuty	C-in-C, Madras Army; 1813	Succeeded by Sir Thomas Hislop
Preceded by Charles Crosbie	Colonel of the 53rd (Shropshire) Regiment of Foot; 1807–1817	Succeeded by Rowland Lord Hill
Parliament of the United Kingdom
Preceded by George Abercromby	Member of Parliament for Clackmannanshire; 1815–1817	Succeeded by Alexander Abercromby
