= George Abercromby, 4th Baron Abercromby =

Scottish politician (1838-1917)

The Right Honourable The Lord Abercromby DL JP
- 4th Baron Abercromby
- Predecessor: George Abercromby, 3rd Baron Abercromby
- Successor: John Abercromby, 5th Baron Abercromby
- Born: George Ralph Campbell Abercromby; 23 September 1838; Leamington Spa, Warwickshire, England
- Died: 30 October 1917 (aged 79); London, England
- Spouse: Julia Haldane-Duncan (m. 1858; died 1915)
- Parents: George Abercromby, 3rd Baron Abercromby; Louisa Penuel Forbes

George Ralph Campbell Abercromby, 4th Baron Abercromby DL JP (23 September 1838 – 30 October 1917), styled The Honourable from 1843 to 1852, was a Scottish peer and politician.

== Background ==
Abercromby was born in Leamington, Warwickshire on 23 September 1838. He was the oldest son of George Abercromby, 3rd Baron Abercromby. His mother Louisa Penuel Forbes was the daughter of the judge John Forbes, Lord Medwyn and sister of the clergyman Alexander Penrose Forbes.

== Career ==
Abercromby succeeded his father as baron in 1852 and joined the House of Lords. He was justice of the peace for Clackmannanshire and Stirlingshire and was nominated a deputy lieutenant for the latter county in 1860.

== Family ==
Abercromby married Lady Julia Janet Georgiana Duncan (b. 1840), the daughter of Adam Haldane-Duncan, 2nd Earl of Camperdown and his wife Juliana Cavendish Philips, at the earl's residence Camperdown House on 6 October 1858. The marriage produced no children.

Lady Abercromby served Queen Victoria as a Lady of the Bedchamber 1874–1885. She died in 1915.

Abercromby survived her for two years, he died in Kensington area of London aged 79. He was succeeded in the barony by his younger brother John.

== Notes ==
Peerage of the United Kingdom
Preceded by George Abercromby	Baron Abercromby; 1852–1917	Succeeded by John Abercromby
