= George Abercromby, 3rd Baron Abercromby =

Scottish politician and peer (1800–1852)

The Right Honourable The Lord Abercromby
- 3rd Baron Abercromby
- Predecessor: George Abercromby, 2nd Baron Abercromby
- Successor: George Abercromby, 4th Baron Abercromby
- Born: George Ralph Campbell Abercromby; 30 May 1800; Edinburgh, Scotland
- Died: 25 June 1852 (aged 52); Airthrey Castle, Stirlingshire, Scotland
- Spouse: Louisa Penuel Forbes (m. 1832)
- Issue: Montague Boyle, Countess of Glasgow; George Abercromby, 4th Baron Abercromby; John Abercromby, 5th Baron Abercromby; Lt. Ralph Abercromby
- Parents: George Abercromby, 2nd Baron Abercromby; Montague Dundas

George Ralph Campbell Abercromby, 3rd Baron Abercromby (30 May 1800 – 25 June 1852) was a Scottish soldier, politician and peer. The son of George Abercromby, 2nd Baron Abercromby and Montague Dundas, on his death in 1852 he was succeeded in the barony by his eldest son.

== Career ==
He was commissioned into the 51st Foot. In 1817 he purchased a lieutenancy in the 3rd Foot Guards and in 1818 exchanged into the 3rd Dragoon Guards as a cornet. In 1821 he purchased a lieutenancy in the regiment and in 1822 he purchased a captaincy in the 12th Light Dragoons. By 1828 he was back in the 3rd Dragoon Guards as a major and in that year he purchased an unattached infantry Lieutenant-colonelcy. By 1842 he was a colonel and in that year he exchanged into the Coldstream Guards as a lieutenant-colonel. On the death of his father on 15 February 1843 he succeeded to the title of 3rd Baron Abercromby.

He was a Whig Member of Parliament for Clackmannanshire, 1824–26 and 1830–1831; for Stirlingshire, 1838–1841; and for Clackmannanshire and Kinross-shire, 1841–1842. He was Lord Lieutenant of Clackmannanshire, 1840–1852.

On his death, he was buried at Tullibody.

== Family ==
He married Louisa Penuel Forbes, daughter of John Hay Forbes, Lord Medwyn and Louisa Cumming-Gordon, on 3 April 1832 and had issue:

- Montague Abercromby (1835–1931), married George Boyle, 6th Earl of Glasgow (1856)
- George Ralph Campbell Abercromby, 4th Baron Abercromby (1838–1917)
- John Abercromby, 5th Baron Abercromby (1841–1924)
- Lt. Ralph Abercromby (1842–1897)

Parliament of the United Kingdom
Preceded by Robert Bruce (1795–1864)	Member of Parliament for Clackmannanshire; 1824–1826	Succeeded by George Edward Graham (Alternating constituency)
Preceded by George Edward Graham (Alternating constituency)	Member of Parliament for Clackmannanshire; 1830–1831	Succeeded by Sir Charles Adam
Preceded by William Forbes	Member of Parliament for Stirlingshire; 1838–1841	Succeeded by William Forbes
Preceded by Sir Charles Adam	Member of Parliament for Clackmannanshire and Kinross-shire; 1841–1842	Succeeded by Sir William Morison
Honorary titles
Preceded by The Earl of Mansfield	Lord Lieutenant of Clackmannanshire; 1840–1852	Succeeded by The Earl of Mansfield and Mansfield
Peerage of the United Kingdom
Preceded by George Abercromby	Baron Abercromby; 1843–1852	Succeeded by George Abercromby
