= Erskine baronets of Alva (1666) =

Coat of arms of Erskine of Alva: Quarterly: 1st and 4th Azure a bend between six cross crosslets fitchée or, 2nd and 3rd Argent a pale sable, all within a bordure quartered or and vert

The Erskine baronetcy, of Alva in the County of Fife, was created in the Baronetage of Nova Scotia on 30 April 1666 for Charles Erskine.

The 3rd Baronet was one of the Scottish representatives to the 1st Parliament of Great Britain and also represented Clackmannanshire. The 4th Baronet was killed in action at the Battle of Lauffeld in 1747. The 5th Baronet sat as Member of Parliament for Ayr Burghs and Anstruther Easter Burghs. He married Janet, daughter of Peter Wedderburn (a Lord of Session under the judicial title of Lord Chesterhall) and sister of Alexander Wedderburn, 1st Earl of Rosslyn. Their son, the 6th Baronet, succeeded to the earldom of Rosslyn in 1805 according to a special remainder in the letters patent. For further history of the baronetcy, see Earl of Rosslyn.

== Erskine baronets, of Alva (1666) ==
- Sir Charles Erskine, 1st Baronet (1643–1690)
- Sir James Erskine, 2nd Baronet (c. 1670–1693)
- Sir John Erskine, 3rd Baronet (1672–1739)
- Sir Charles Erskine, 4th Baronet (born 7 May 1709 died 2 July 1747)
- Sir Henry Erskine, 5th Baronet (c. 1710–1765)
- Sir James Erskine, 6th Baronet (1762–1837) (succeeded as Earl of Rosslyn in 1805)
