= Robert Abercromby (British Army officer) =

British Army officer (1740–1827)

General Sir Robert Abercromby GCB
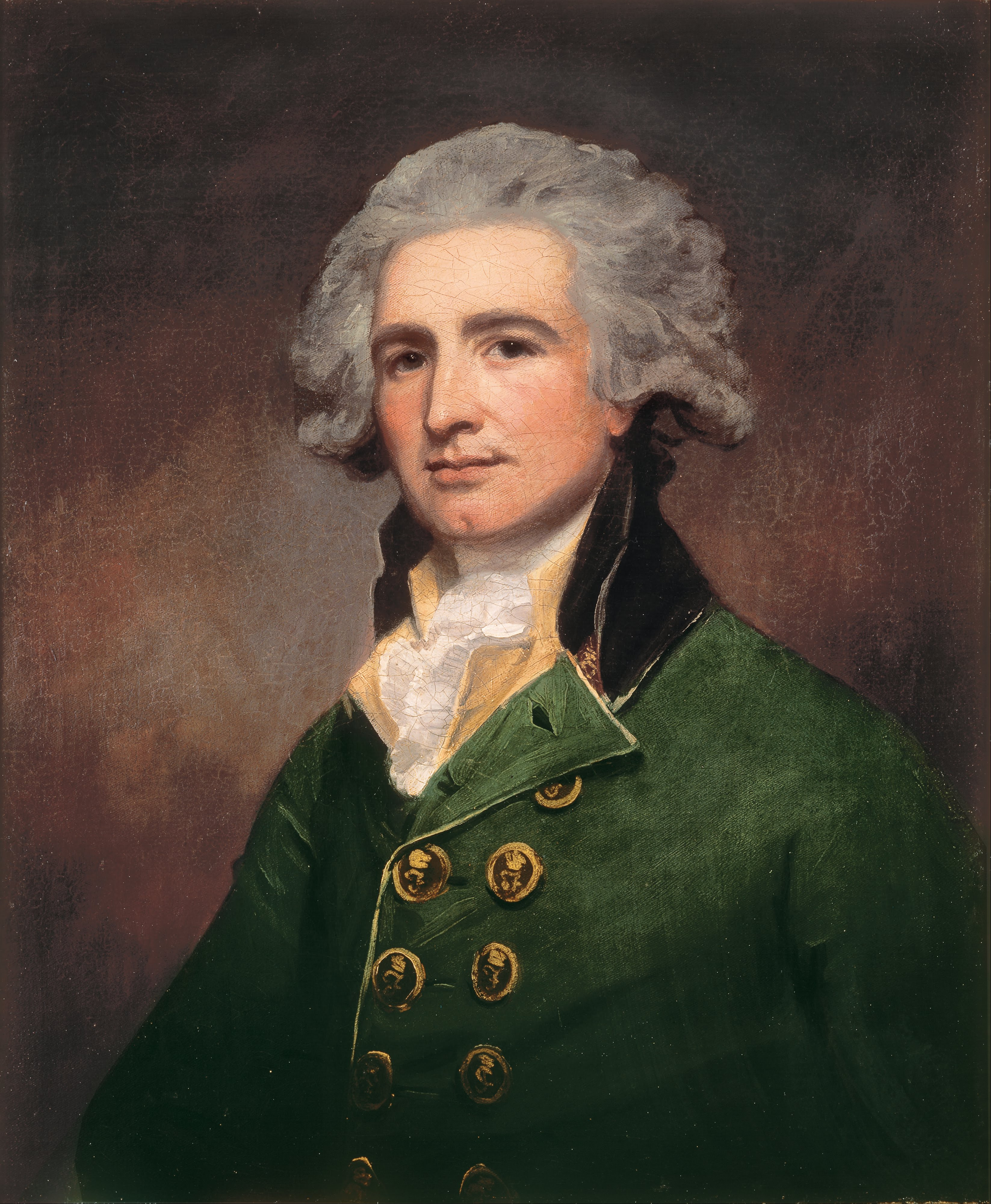
- Portrait by George Romney, 1788
- Born: 21 October 1740
- Died: 3 November 1827 (aged 87); Airthrey Castle, Scotland
- Military career
- Allegiance: Great Britain; United Kingdom
- Branch: British Army; Bombay Army
- Service years: 1758–1827
- Rank: General
- Units: 44th Regiment of Foot; 62nd Regiment of Foot; 37th Regiment of Foot
- Commands: 75th Regiment of Foot
- Conflicts: French and Indian War; American War of Independence; New York and New Jersey campaign; Battle of Long Island; Battle of Brandywine; Battle of Germantown; Battle of Crooked Billet; Battle of Monmouth; Siege of Charleston; Siege of Yorktown (POW); Third Anglo-Mysore War; Second Rohilla War
- Awards: Knight Grand Cross of the Order of the Bath

General Sir Robert Abercromby, GCB (21 October 1740 – 3 November 1827) was a British Army officer, politician and colonial administrator who served as the governor of Bombay from 1790 to 1792. He also represented Clackmannanshire and Kinross-shire in the British House of Commons from 1798 to 1802. The youngest brother of Sir Ralph Abercromby, he fought in the American War of Independence before serving in India as part of the Bombay Army, where he eventually rose to the rank of Commander-in-Chief, India.

== Life ==
Robert Abercromby was born on 21 October 1740. On 8 July 1758 he was commissioned into the British Army's 44th Regiment of Foot at the rank of ensign during the French and Indian War. Abercromby was promoted to captain in 1761 and was promoted again to major in the 62nd Regiment of Foot in 1772. On 30 November 1775 he was promoted to lieutenant colonel in the 37th Regiment of Foot. During the American War of Independence Abercromby fought at the battles of Long Island, Brandywine, Germantown, Crooked Billet and Monmouth along with the sieges of Charleston and Yorktown, the latter of which saw him commanding the left wing of the British army.

Following the end of the American War of Independence in 1783 Abercromby was made colonel of the 75th Regiment of Foot, which had been raised to serve in British India. In 1790 he was promoted to major general and sent to India, having been appointed as both the governor of Bombay and commander-in-chief of the Bombay Army. He served as governor until 1792 and commander-in-chief until 1793, participating in the Third Anglo-Mysore War. Abercromby served in the Second Rohilla War before returning to Britain in 1797, where in 1798 he purchased Airthrey Castle from the Haldane family and was thereafter entitled Abercromby of Aithrey.

Abercromby was promoted to lieutenant-general in 1797, elected as a member of parliament for Clackmannanshire and Kinross-shire in the place of his brother Ralph in 1798, and was made governor of Edinburgh Castle in 1801 and promoted to general in 1802. His increasing blindness, arising from an eye disease contracted in India, made it impossible for him ever again to take active service, and obliged him to resign his seat in parliament in 1802. He died at Airthrey Castle on 3 November 1827.

Military offices
New regiment	Colonel of the 75th (Stirlingshire) Regiment of Foot; 1787–1827	Succeeded by James Dunlop of Dunlop
Preceded by William Medows	C-in-C, Bombay Army; 1790–1793	Succeeded by James Stuart
Preceded by Charles Cornwallis	Commander-in-Chief, India; 1793–1797	Succeeded by Charles Morgan
Preceded by Lord Adam Gordon	Governor of Edinburgh Castle; 1801–1827	Succeeded by The Duke of Gordon
Political offices
Preceded by William Medows	Governor of Bombay; 1790–1792	Succeeded by George Dick
Parliament of Great Britain
Preceded by Sir Ralph Abercromby	Member of Parliament for Clackmannanshire and Kinross-shire; 1798–1801	Succeeded by Parliament of the United Kingdom
Parliament of the United Kingdom
Preceded by Parliament of Great Britain	Member of Parliament for Clackmannanshire and Kinross-shire; 1801–1802	Succeeded by William MacLean-Clephane
