= Abercromby (name) =

Origin
- Region of origin: Scotland, United Kingdom

Other names
- Variant form: Abercrombie

== Surname ==
- Alexander Abercromby (disambiguation), name of several people
- Andrew Abercromby (born 1980), NASA biomedical engineer
- Billy Abercromby (born 1958), Scottish football player
- David Abercromby (died 1702), Scottish physician and writer
- George Abercromby, 2nd Baron Abercromby (1770–1843), Scottish lawyer and politician
- George Abercromby, 3rd Baron Abercromby (1800–1852), Scottish soldier and politician
- George Abercromby, 4th Baron Abercromby (1838–1917), Scottish politician
- Sir George Abercromby, 8th Baronet (1886–1964), Scottish landowner
- Sir James Abercromby, 2nd Baronet (c. 1670–1734), Scottish MP for Banffshire
- James Abercromby, 1st Baron Dunfermline (1776–1858), British politician and son of Ralph Abercromby
- John Abercromby (monk) (died 1561), victim of the Scottish Reformation
- Sir John Abercromby (British Army officer) (1772–1817), British general and politician, son of Ralph Abercromby
- John Abercromby, 5th Baron Abercromby (1841–1924), Scottish antiquary
- Julia Janet Georgiana Abercromby (1840–1915), British Courtier, Baroness and artist
- Mary Abercromby, 1st Baroness Abercromby (née Menzies, b. 1752–1821), Scottish socialite
- Patrick Abercromby (1656–1716), Scottish physician and antiquarian
- Ralph Abercromby (1734–1801), British general and father of James Abercromby
- Ralph Abercromby, 2nd Baron Dunfermline (1803–1868), British diplomat and son of James Abercromby.
- Ralph Abercromby (meteorologist) (1842–1897), Scottish meteorologist
- Robert Abercromby (disambiguation), name of several people

== See also ==
- Abercromby baronets
- Abercrombie (disambiguation)
- Crombie (disambiguation)
