= James Abercromby =

James Abercromby or Abercrombie may refer to:

- Sir James Abercrombie, 1st Baronet (c. 1680–1724), British Army officer and politician
- Sir James Abercromby, 2nd Baronet (c. 1670–1734), Scottish MP for Banffshire
- James Abercrombie (British Army officer, born 1706) (1706–1781), British general
- James Abercrombie (British Army officer, born 1732) (1732–1775), British colonel
- James Abercromby, 1st Baron Dunfermline (1776–1858), British politician
- James Abercrombie (Alabama politician) (1792–1861), American politician from Alabama
- James Abercrombie (inventor) (1891–1975), American inventor
- James Abercrombie (priest) (1758–1841), American Episcopal priest
- James Abercrombie Jr., American politician from Florida

== See also ==
- Jim Abercrombie (1880–1948), Australian rugby league footballer
- Abercrombie (surname)
