= 1688 in literature =

This article contains information about the literary events and publications of 1688.

== Events ==
- February – John Locke returns to England in the escort of Princess Mary, the same year that the first abstract of his seminal An Essay Concerning Human Understanding appears in Leclerc's Bibliotheque universelle, although the work itself is not published until the following year.
- December – John Dryden refuses to swear allegiance to the new monarchy after the Glorious Revolution and is dismissed as Poet Laureate of the United Kingdom. He is the only laureate not to die in office until the initiation of fixed-term appointments with Andrew Motion in 1999.
- unknown date – The fourth, first illustrated edition of John Milton's Paradise Lost is published by Jacob Tonson in London. The illustrators include John Baptist Medina.

== New books ==
=== Prose ===
- David Abercromby – Ars explorandi medicas facultates plantarum ex solo sapore
- Etienne Baluze – Marca hispanica
- Aphra Behn:
  - The History of the Nun, or the Fair Vow-Breaker
  - Oroonoko, or the Royal Slave
  - The Fair Jilt: or, the Amours of Prince Tarquin and Miranda
- Biblia de la București (Bucharest Bible, first complete translation into Romanian)
- Bernard le Bovier de Fontenelle – Digression sur les anciens et les modernes
- Jean de La Bruyère – Les Caractères
- Ihara Saikaku (井原 西鶴)
  - The Eternal Storehouse of Japan
  - Tales of Samurai Honor
- Henry More – Divine Dialogues
- George Savile, 1st Marquess of Halifax
  - The Anatomy of an Equivalent
  - The Lady's New-Years Gift: or, Advice to a Daughter (anonymous)

=== Drama ===
- John Crowne – Darius, King of Persia
- Thomas D'Urfey – A Fool's Preferment
- William Mountfort – The Injured Lovers
- Thomas Shadwell – The Squire of Alsatia
- Sor Juana Inés de la Cruz – El divino Narciso

=== Poetry ===
- See 1688 in poetry
- Romances varios

== Births ==
- January 29 – Emanuel Swedenborg, Swedish scientist, philosopher and theologian. (died 1772)
- February – Hermanus Angelkot junior, Dutch pharmacist, poet and dramatist (died 1727)
- February 4 – Pierre de Marivaux, French playwright (died 1763)
- February 7 – John Morgan, Anglo-Welsh poet (died 1733)
- April 2 (baptised) – Lewis Theobald, English Shakespearean editor (died 1744)
- May 21 – Alexander Pope, English poet (died 1744)
- September 6 (baptised) – Laurence Eusden, English poet laureate (died 1730)
- November 13 – Noël-Antoine Pluche, French natural historian and priest (died 1761)
- November 15 (baptised) – Charles Rivington, English publisher (died 1742)
- December 24 – Johann Bachstrom, Polish theologian and writer (died 1742)
- Unknown date – Richard Bradley, English scientific writer (died 1732)
- probable – William Meston, Scottish poet (died 1745)

== Deaths ==
- March 15 – Peter Walsh, Irish politician and historian (born 1618)
- May 14 – Antoine Furetière, French satirist (born 1619)
- May 22 – Johannes Andreas Quenstedt, German theologian (born 1617)
- June 26 – Ralph Cudworth, English philosopher (born 1617)
- August 31 – John Bunyan, English writer and preacher (born 1628)
- September 22 – François Bernier, French physician and travel writer (born 1625)
- October 14 – Joachim von Sandrart, German/Dutch art historian (born 1606)
- November 16 – Bengt Gottfried Forselius, Swedish Estonian educational pioneer (born c. 1660)
- November 26 – Philippe Quinault, French dramatist (born 1635)
- December 8 – Thomas Flatman, English poet and painter (born 1635)
- December 20 – Thomas Jevon, English playwright and harlequin (born 1652)
