= Abercrombie (surname) =

Abercrombie (/ˈæbərkrʌmbi, -krɒmbi/ AB-ər-krum-bee, -krom-bee) is a Scottish surname, and may refer to:

- Alexander Abercrombie (1949–2023), British pianist, composer, and mathematician
- Cecil Abercrombie (1886–1916), British rugby player and cricketer
- Charles Abercrombie Smith (1834–1919), South African scientist and politician
- David Abercrombie (linguist) (1909–1992), British phonetician
- David T. Abercrombie (1867–1931), American businessman and founder of the company Abercrombie & Fitch
- Frank Abercrombie (1850–1939), American baseball player
- Gertrude Abercrombie (1909–1977), American painter
- Gordon Abercrombie, Australian rugby league player
- E. Wayne Abercrombie (born 1938), American choral director
- Ian Abercrombie (1934–2012), British actor
- James Abercrombie (disambiguation), various people
- Jeff Abercrombie (born 1969), American musician, co-founder of the hard-rock band Fuel
- Jim Abercrombie (1880–1948), Australian rugby league player
- Joe Abercrombie (born 1974), British fantasy writer
- John Abercrombie (disambiguation), the name of several people
- Josephine Abercrombie (1926–2022), American horse breeder
- Lascelles Abercrombie (1881–1938), British poet and literary critic
- Leonard A. Abercrombie (1832–1891), American politician, lawyer and Confederate army officer
- Michael Abercrombie (1912–1979), British cell biologist and embryologist
- Minnie Abercrombie (1909–1984), British zoologist
- Neil Abercrombie (born 1938), American politician and Governor of Hawaii
- Patrick Abercrombie (1879–1957), British town-planner, responsible for the Abercrombie Plan for the redevelopment of post-war London
- Percy Abercrombie (1884–1964), Australian rules footballer
- Reggie Abercrombie (born 1980), American baseball player
- Thomas Abercrombie (disambiguation), the name of several people
- Walter Abercrombie (born 1959), American football player

== See also ==
- Abercrombie (disambiguation)
- Abercromby (name)
