= Abercromby =

Abercromby may refer to:

- Abercromby (name) (includes a list of people with the surname Abercromby)
- Abercromby (UK Parliament constituency), 1885–1918
- Abercromby (Liverpool ward), an electoral ward of the Liverpool City Council
- Abercromby Square, Liverpool, England
- Abercromby (1795 ship), a British East India Company ship, wrecked 1812
- Captain Abercromby a UK children's television show
- Lord Abercromby (1745–1795), Scottish advocate, judge and essayist
- Clan Abercromby, a Scottish lowland clan

== See also ==
- Abercrombie (disambiguation)
