= David Abercrombie =

David Abercrombie may refer to:

- David T. Abercrombie (1867–1931), American entrepreneur and co-founder of Abercrombie & Fitch
- David Abercrombie (linguist) (1909–1992), British academic and author

== See also ==
- David Abercromby (before 1650–after 1700), Scottish physician and writer
- David Abercrombie Donaldson (1916–1996), Scottish artist
- Abercrombie (surname)
