= Crombie =

Crombie may refer to:

== People ==
- Alexander Crombie (1762–1840), British educator, philosopher and Presbyterian minister
- Alistair Cameron Crombie (1915–1996), Australian historian
- Bonnie Crombie (born 1960), Canadian politician and current mayor of Mississauga, Ontario
- Cameron Crombie (born 1986), Australian para-athlete
- Charles Crombie (1914–1945), Australian flying ace of the Second World War
- David Crombie (born 1936), Canadian politician
- Deborah Crombie (born 1952), American author of mystery books
- Donald Crombie (1942–2025), Australian film director, father of Fiona
- Ed Crombie (born 1945), Canadian racecar driver
- Elaine Crombie, Australian actress, daughter of Lillian
- Fiona Crombie, Australian costume and production designer, daughter of Donald
- James Crombie, multiple people
- Jamie Crombie (born 1965), American-Canadian squash player
- John Crombie, multiple people including:
  - John Crombie, founder of the Crombie (clothing), a clothing brand
  - John Crombie (1900–1972), Scottish Royal Navy officer
- Jonathan Crombie (1966–2015), Canadian actor
- Leslie Crombie (1923–1999), British chemist
- Lillian Crombie (1958–2024), Australian actress and dancer, mother of Elaine
- Noel Crombie (born 1953), musician (member of Split Enz)
- Peter Crombie (1952–2024), American film and television actor
- Tony Crombie (1925–1999), English jazz drummer and bandleader
- Tony Crombie, Commissioner of the British Antarctic Territory since 2004
- Thomas Crombie Schelling (1921–2016), American economist

=== Fictional characters ===
- Blake Crombie, fictional character from New Zealand soap opera Shortland Street

== Other uses ==
- Crombie (clothing), trade name for clothing made by the J&J Crombie company
- Crombie Settlement, New Brunswick, a Canadian rural community in Victoria County, New Brunswick
- Crombie REIT, Canadian property management company
- Crombie, Fife, a village in Scotland
- DM Crombie, a military munitions storage depot on the Firth of Forth, Scotland
