= Abercrombie =

Abercrombie may refer to:

== People ==
- Abercrombie Lawson (1870–1927), botanist and professor
- Abercrombie (surname) (list of people with the family name Abercrombie)

== Places ==
=== Antarctica ===
- Abercrombie Crests, rock summits in Antarctica

=== Australia ===
- Abercrombie Caves, a cave system in New South Wales
- Abercrombie River, a river in New South Wales
- Abercrombie House, a house in Bathurst, New South Wales
- Abercrombie River National Park, a national park in New South Wales
- Abercrombie, Tasmania, a former town

=== Canada ===
- Abercrombie, Nova Scotia, a community

=== United Kingdom ===
- Abercrombie, Fife, village in Fife, Scotland

=== United States ===
- Abercrombie, North Dakota, a city
- Abercrombie Township, Richland County, North Dakota, a township
- Fort Abercrombie, a historic fort in North Dakota
- Abercrombie, Alabama, an unincorporated community
- Abercrombie Mountain, a mountain in Washington
- John H. and Mary Abercrombie House, a historic home in Fort Wayne, Indiana

== Ships ==
- Abercrombie-class monitor, a class of monitors that served in the Royal Navy during the First World War
- HMS Abercrombie, the name of three ships of the Royal Navy
- USS Abercrombie (DE-343), a US Navy John C. Butler-class destroyer escort of World War II

== Other ==
- Abercrombie & Fitch, an American apparel chain
- Abercrombie & Kent, luxury travel company
- Abercrombie (horse) (1975–2000), a bay harness racing horse
- Lord Abercrombie, a title peerage in Scotland
- Operation Abercrombie, 1942 raid on Hardelot, France
- Sir Ralph Abercromby (pub), in Manchester

== See also ==
- Abercromby (disambiguation)
- Abercrombie Plan (disambiguation)
