= John Abercrombie =

John Abercrombie or Abercromby may refer to:

- John Abercrombie (guitarist) (1944–2017), American jazz guitarist
- John Abercrombie (politician) (1866–1940), president of the University of Alabama and United States representative from Alabama
- John Abercromby, 5th Baron Abercromby (1841–1924), Scottish antiquary
- John Abercrombie (cricketer) (1817–1892), English cricketer
- John Joseph Abercrombie (1798–1877), US Army Civil War brigadier general
- John Abercrombie (physician) (1780–1844), Scottish physician and philosopher
- John Abercrombie (horticulturist) (1726–1806), Scottish horticulturalist and writer
- John Abercromby (monk) (fl. 1561), 16th-century Roman Catholic martyr, maybe fictitious
- Sir John Abercromby (British Army officer) (1772–1817), British general and politician
- John Brown Abercromby (1843–1929), Scottish artist
