= Abercrombie Plan =

Abercrombie Plan may refer to any one of a number of urban planning proposals written or co-written by Sir Leslie Patrick Abercrombie, including:

- County of London Plan (1943, with John Henry Forshaw)
- Greater London Plan (1944)
- A Plan for the City & County of Kingston upon Hull (1945, with Sir Edwin Lutyens)
- Abercrombie Plan (Edinburgh), a plan for Edinburgh

== See also ==
- Abercrombie (disambiguation)
