= Cameron ram-type blowout preventer =

Blowout preventer for oil wells

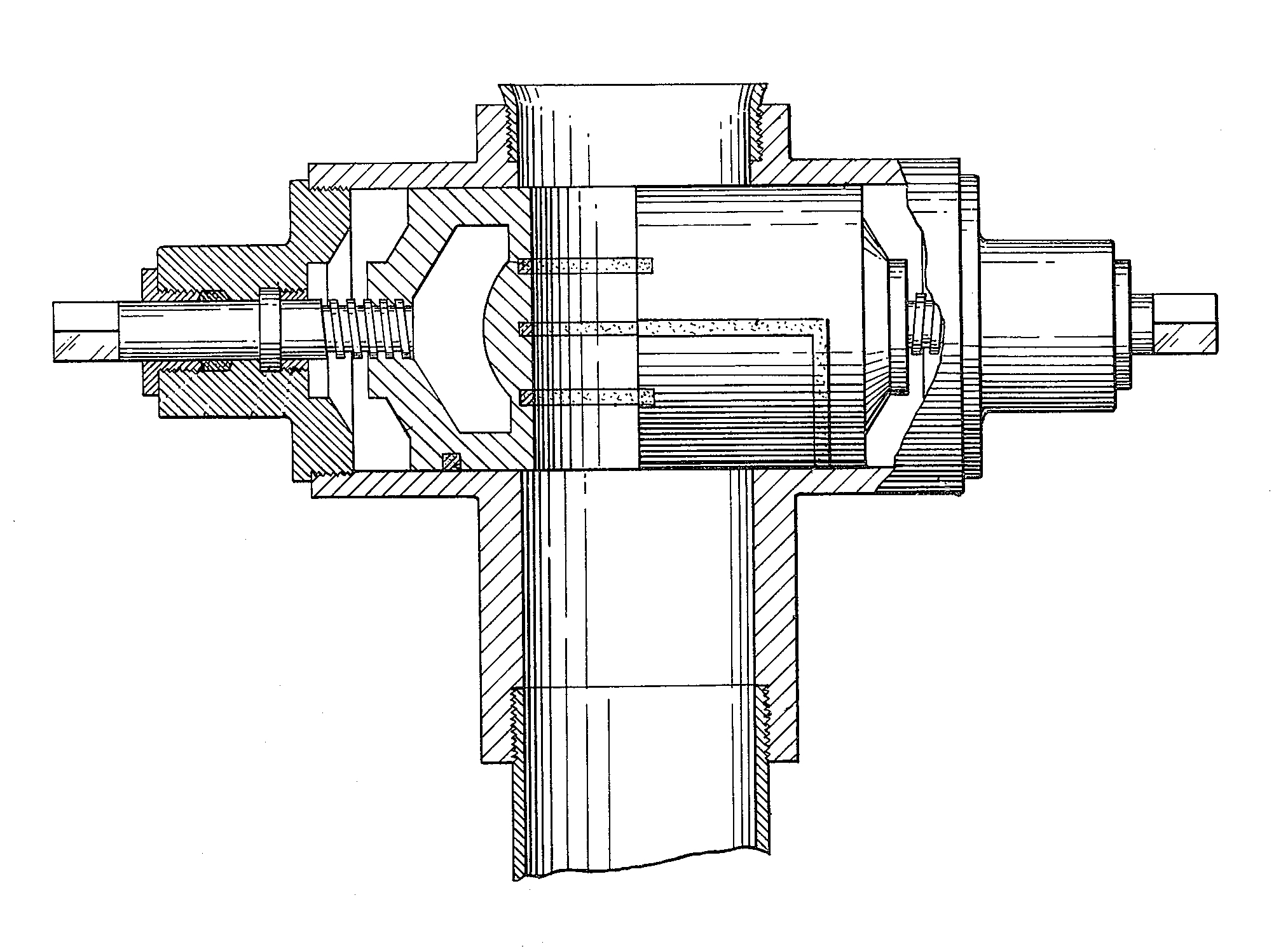
Cameron ram-type blowout preventer

The Cameron ram-type blowout preventer was the first successful blowout preventer (BOP) for oil wells. It was developed by James S. Abercrombie and Harry S. Cameron in 1922. The device was issued U.S. patent 1,569,247 on January 12, 1926. The blowout preventer was designated as a Mechanical Engineering Landmark in 2003.

== History ==
While drilling an oil or gas well, the top of the wellbore is lined with a casing. The drill string runs through the casing. The annular (ring-shaped) region between the casing and the drill stem is filled with drilling mud which provides hydrostatic pressure to keep the formation fluid from coming up the wellbore. If the pressure of the formation fluid exceeds the hydrostatic pressure of the drilling mud, the oil or gas can blow out of the wellbore. This has caused spills of large quantities of oil and fires on drilling rigs. The blowout of the Lucas well at the Spindletop field in 1901 lasted for over nine days and spilled over 500,000 US barrels (60,000,000 L; 16,000,000 US gal; 13,000,000 imp gal) of oil.

James Smither Abercrombie (1891–1975), a Texas oil driller, and Harry S. Cameron (1872–1928), who operated a machine shop, formed the Cameron Iron Works in 1920. Abercrombie had an idea for a blowout preventer and took it to Cameron. They designed and built the device at the Cameron Iron works. This resulted in the first ram-type blowout preventer, which they called the MO BOP.

Cameron Iron Works successfully marketed their blowout preventer and developed other tools for petroleum exploration. In 1990, Cooper Industries acquired the company. Cooper's petroleum divisions were transferred into the Cooper Cameron Corporation. This company is now called Cameron International Corporation.

== Design ==
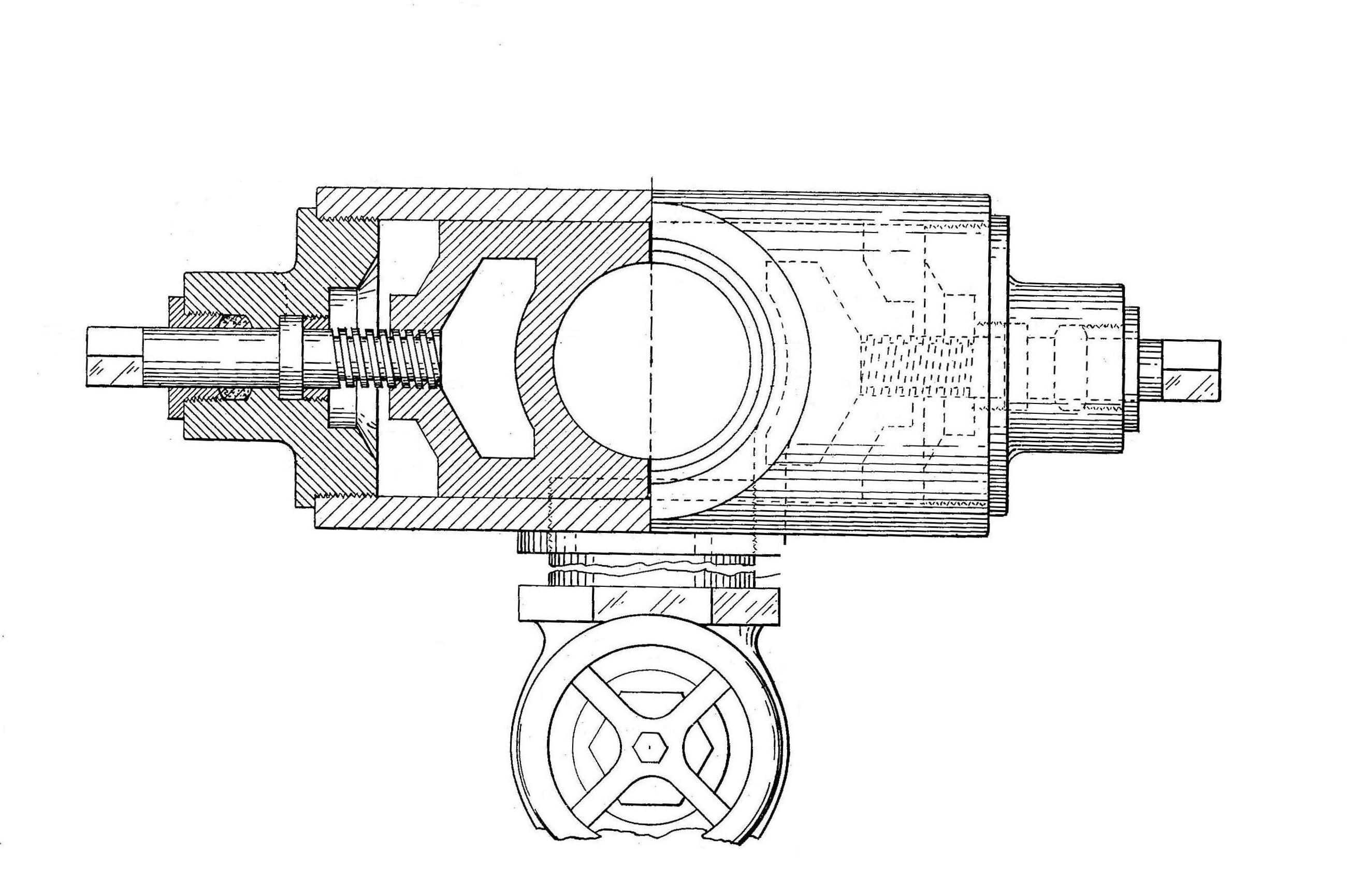
Plan view of the Cameron BOP

The blowout preventer is a T-shaped coupling that is screwed onto the top of the casing. It has a passage through the coupling for the drill string. There is a ram with a concave, semi-circular face in each arm of the tee. Each ram is moved in or out by turning its valve stem, which extends beyond the coupling. The ends of the stems are squared off.

When the rams are retracted, there is a passage for the drilling mud. If a blowout begins, the drill string is stopped. Then wrenches are used to manually close the rams around the drill string to seal the wellbore. The MO BOP was tested to withstand 3,000 pounds per square inch (21,000 kPa).

The device had a lateral valve below the rams on its bottom section. In case of a blowout, a mud pump could be used to pump drilling mud into the wellbore to control the blowout.
