= Alexander Abercromby =

Alexander Abercromby may refer to:

- Sir Alexander Abercromby, 1st Baronet (c. 1603–1684), Scottish politician, commissioner for Banffshire 1640–1641, 1643, 1646–1648 and 1661–1663
- Alexander Abercromby (Scottish politician, born 1678) (1678–1728), Scottish politician, MP for Banffshire 1706–1727
- Alexander Abercromby, Lord Abercromby (1745–1795), Scottish advocate, judge and essayist
- Alexander Abercromby (British Army officer) (1784–1853), Scottish army officer and politician, MP for Clackmannanshire

== See also ==
- Abercromby (surname)
