= Clan Abercromby =

Scottish clan

- Crest: A falcon rising belled Proper.
- Motto: Petit Alta ('He seeks high deeds')

Profile
- District: Banffshire, Clackmannanshire, Fife
- Clan Abercromby no longer has a chief, and is an armigerous clan
Clan branches
Abercromby of Birkenbog (historic chiefs) (see Abercromby baronets)
Titles
Baron Abercromby

Clan Abercromby, also known as Clan Abercrombie, is a Scottish clan with lands in the Scottish Highlands and Lowlands. The clan was first attested to in 1296 with William de Abercromby, who was given charter of Abercrombie, Fife.

Lt.-Gen. Sir Ralph Abercromby was a notable commander during the French Revolutionary Wars who greatly reformed the British Army. His widow was created Baroness Abercromby in 1801.

== Tartan ==
Tartan image	Notes
	Clan Abercromby/Abercrombie
