= James Abercrombie (inventor) =

American inventor

- Born: July 7, 1891; Huntsville, Texas
- Died: January 7, 1975 (aged 83); Houston, Texas
- Known for: Cameron ram-type blowout preventer

James Smither Abercrombie (7 July 1891 – 7 January 1975) was an American inventor who is best known for designing the world's first reliable blowout preventer (BOP) to contain disastrous well blowouts.

Abercrombie was born the fourth of 13 children in Huntsville, Texas to parents James Buford and Evelina Abercrombie Jr on 7 July, 1891. He attended a grammar school in his hometown throughout childhood, before eventually his family was forced to move in 1900, citing a combination of the harsh winters in the area, as well as an infestation of boll weevil feeding on local cotton crops. During this period he attended school and picked up various jobs to help his family make money, one such as a soda jerk. Around turning 15, he worked to help with his family's newly started dairy farm on the outskirts of Houston.

In 1909, Abercrombie got his first job working in the oil industry as a deckhand for one of Goose Creek Production Company's drilling rigs. This would evolve into buying a drilling rig of his own in 1918 to be stationed north of Wichita Falls. His engagement in the oil industry continued until he eventually became president of Cameron Iron Works.

Abercrombie's work to develop the Cameron ram-type blowout preventer in 1922 would later find him inducted into the National Inventors Hall of Fame in 2020.

While working in Lake Charles, Louisiana, Abercrombie met his wife Lillie Frank. The two married on 6 May, 1925, and had one daughter together, Josephine Abercrombie. Later in life, he along with several others from Houston would help to charter the Texas Children's Hospital through donations towards construction. He would die on 7 January, 1975 in Houston and be buried at Glenwood Cemetery.
