= Abercromby (1795 ship) =

British ship in India

History

Great Britain
- Name: Abercromby
- Owner: Fairlie & Co.
- Port of registry: 1795:Calcutta; 1796:London
- Builder: George Foreman & Nathaniel Bacon, Calcutta
- Launched: 1795
- Fate: Wrecked 29 July 1812

General characteristics
- Tons burthen: 615, or 670 (bm)
- Propulsion: Sail

Abercromby (or Abercrombie) was launched at Calcutta in 1795. She made one voyage from Bengal to England for the British East India Company. She wrecked in 1812.

== Career ==
Captain John Gilmore sailed from Calcutta, passing Kedgeree on 1 February 1796. Abercromby reached Saint Helena on 23 April and Falmouth on 21 June, before arriving at Blackwall on 18 July Blackwall. She carried rice on behalf of the British government which was importing grain to address high prices for wheat in Britain following a poor harvest.

Abercromby was admitted to the Registries of Great Britain on 26 August 1796. The bill for fitting out while in London, dated 1 October 1796, was £1091 4s 8d.

Abercrombie first appeared in Lloyd's Register for 1796 with L. Betts, master, "Farly", owner, and trade London—India. Lloyd's Register for 1797 corrected Farly to Fairlie, and her trade to London-East Indies.

The British government prepared an expedition against Manila in 1797-8 that it cancelled. Abercrombie was one of the vessels chartered as a transport.

== Fate ==
Lloyd's List reported that Abercrombie was lost in the Karimata Strait, Dutch East Indies, in 1812. Her crew were rescued. She was on a voyage from Bombay, India to Canton, China.

The wreck reportedly occurred on 29 July at "Abercromby Reef" (named for the wreckage visible for some years later), in Gaspar Strait at about 2°29′S 107°30′E.
