= Robert Abercromby =

Robert Abercromby may refer to:

- Robert Abercromby (Jesuit) (1536–1613), Scottish Jesuit missionary
- Robert Abercromby (saddler), Scottish artisan serving James VI and I
- Sir Robert Abercromby of Airthrey (1740–1827), general
- Sir Robert Abercromby, 5th Baronet (1784–1855), British politician
- Sir Robert John Abercromby, 7th Baronet (1850–1895)

== See also ==
- Robert Abercrombie Pringle (1855–1922), Canadian lawyer
