= Leslie Crombie =

British chemist

Leslie Crombie FRS FRSC (10 June 1923 – 3 August 1999) was a British chemist.

He was educated at King's College London, where he completed his PhD. He was a lecturer at Imperial College London from 1950 to 1958, professor of organic chemistry at University College, Cardiff from 1963 to 1969, and Sir Jesse Boot Professor of Organic Chemistry at the University of Nottingham from 1969 to 1988, where he was later made an emeritus professor.

He was made a Fellow of the Royal Society in 1973. He was also a Fellow of the Royal Society of Chemistry and a Fellow of King's College London.
