= James Abercrombie (Alabama politician) =

American politician (1792–1861)

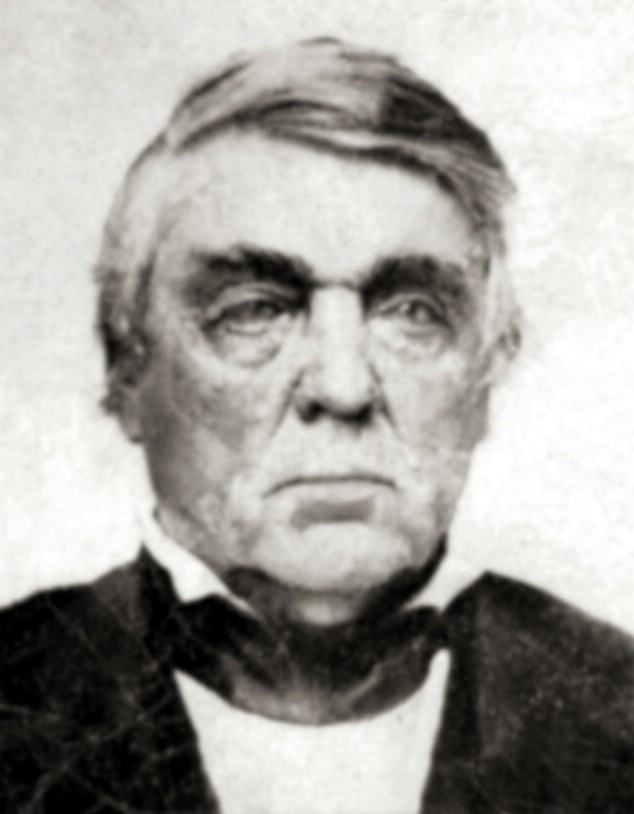

Member of the U.S. House of Representatives from Alabama's 2nd district
- In office March 4, 1851 – March 3, 1855
- Preceded by: Henry Washington Hilliard
- Succeeded by: Eli Sims Shorter

Member of the Alabama House of Representatives
- In office 1820-1822
- In office 1824-1825
- In office 1838-1839

Member of the Alabama Senate
- In office 1825-1833
- In office 1847-1850

Personal details
- Born: February 18, 1792 Hancock County, Georgia
- Died: July 2, 1861 (aged 69) Pensacola, Florida
- Citizenship: United States
- Party: Whig

Military service
- Allegiance: United States of America
- Branch/service: United States Army
- Rank: corporal
- Unit: Squadron of Georgia Cavalry
- Battles/wars: War of 1812

James Abercrombie (February 18, 1792 – July 2, 1861) was an American politician, serving as a member of the Alabama House of Representatives and the Alabama Senate. He later represented Alabama's Second Congressional District in the United States Congress from 1851 to 1855.

== Early life ==
Abercrombie was born in Hancock County, Georgia on February 18, 1792, to Charles and Edwina Dicey Malinda Booth Abercrombie. His father was an officer in the American Revolutionary War and later became an active politician in Georgia. Abercrombie received a good education and fought in the War of 1812, serving as corporal in Major F. Freeman's Squadron of Georgia Cavalry.

Following the war, Abercrombie moved to Monroe County (present-day Dallas County), Alabama and settled in Montgomery County, Alabama, in 1819. He married Evelina Elizabeth Ross in 1816, and they had four sons and six daughters, including James, Sarah, Jane, and Clara. While becoming interested in politics, Abercrombie owned and managed several large plantations and was a slave owner.

== Career ==
Abercrombie was elected to the Alabama House of Representatives in 1822, 1824, and later in 1838. He served as a captain in the Alabama Militia during this time, and was present when the Marquis de la Lafayette visited Fort Mitchell during his tour of the state. Abercrombie became a member of the Whig Party and served in the Alabama Senate from 1847 to 1850.

Abercrombie was a delegate to the first Nashville Convention in 1850 that was held to bring pro-slavery Southerners together to discuss the possibility of secession, considering himself a Unionist, despite supporting the institution of enslavement. He was elected to the United States House of Representatives from Alabama's Second Congressional District, where he served from March 4, 1851, to March 3, 1855.

== Death ==
After retiring from politics in 1856, Abercrombie moved to Pensacola, Florida, where he worked as a brick contractor for the U.S. government. He remained involved in Alabama politics, and although he did not serve, he helped in campaigns and political efforts. Abercrombie died on July 2, 1861, and is interred at Linwood Cemetery in Columbus, Georgia.

U.S. House of Representatives
Preceded by Henry Washington Hilliard	Member of the U.S. House of Representatives from Alabama's 2nd congressional district March 4, 1851 – March 3, 1855	Succeeded by Eli Sims Shorter
