= James Abercrombie Jr. =

American politician

James Abercrombie Jr. was an American politician. He was a state legislator in Florida. From 1860 to 1865 he served in the Florida Senate, representing the 1st District. He was born in Alabama, and was the son of Congressman James Abercrombie (1792–1861).

Abercrombie managed his family's brickmaking business in Pensacola. It worked to supply the U.S. government with bricks for its forts. He was an incorporator of Florida Gas Light Company in 1861.
