= Noël-Antoine Pluche =

French priest

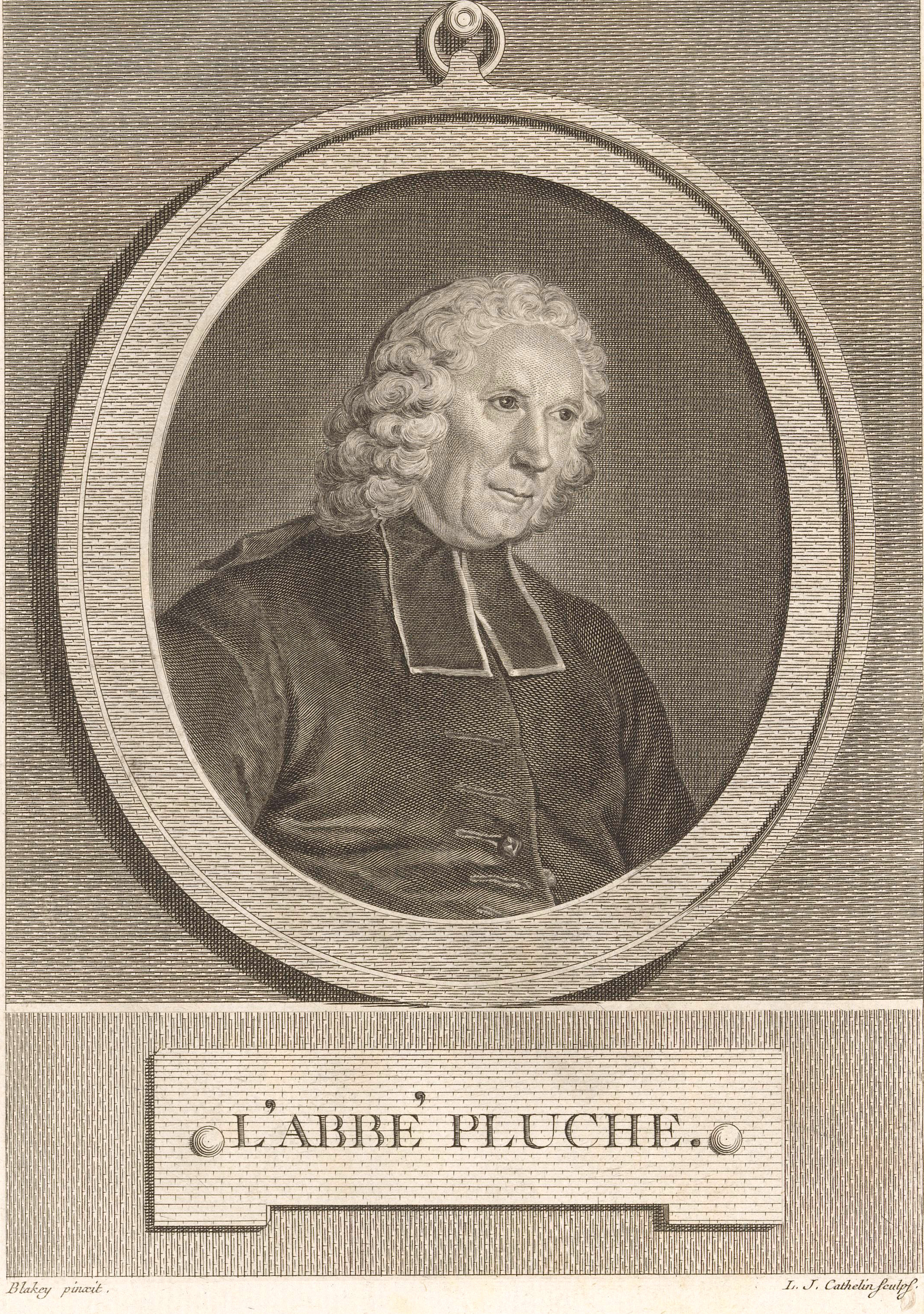
- Born: 13 November 1688; Reims, Kingdom of France
- Died: 19 November 1761 (aged 73); La Varenne-Saint-Maur, Kingdom of France
- Writing career
- Subject: natural history
- Notable work: Spectacle de la nature

Noël-Antoine Pluche (13 November 1688 – 19 November 1761), known as the abbé Pluche, was a French priest. He is now known for his Spectacle de la nature, a most popular work of natural history.

== Biography ==
Pluche, son of a baker, was born in Reims, in a street now named after him. He became a teacher of rhetoric. The Bishop of Laon made him head of the town's college, a post he accepted to escape judicial consequences of opposing the papal bull Unigenitus (1713)

He withdrew in 1749 to La Varenne-Saint-Maur, near Paris, where he died.

His Spectacle de la nature, ou Entretiens sur les particularités de l'Histoire naturelle qui ont paru les plus propres à rendre les jeunes gens curieux et à leur former l'esprit was published in nine volumes 1732–1742, and widely translated all over Europe. Although it influenced many to become naturalists, it was a work of popularization, not of science.

== Works ==
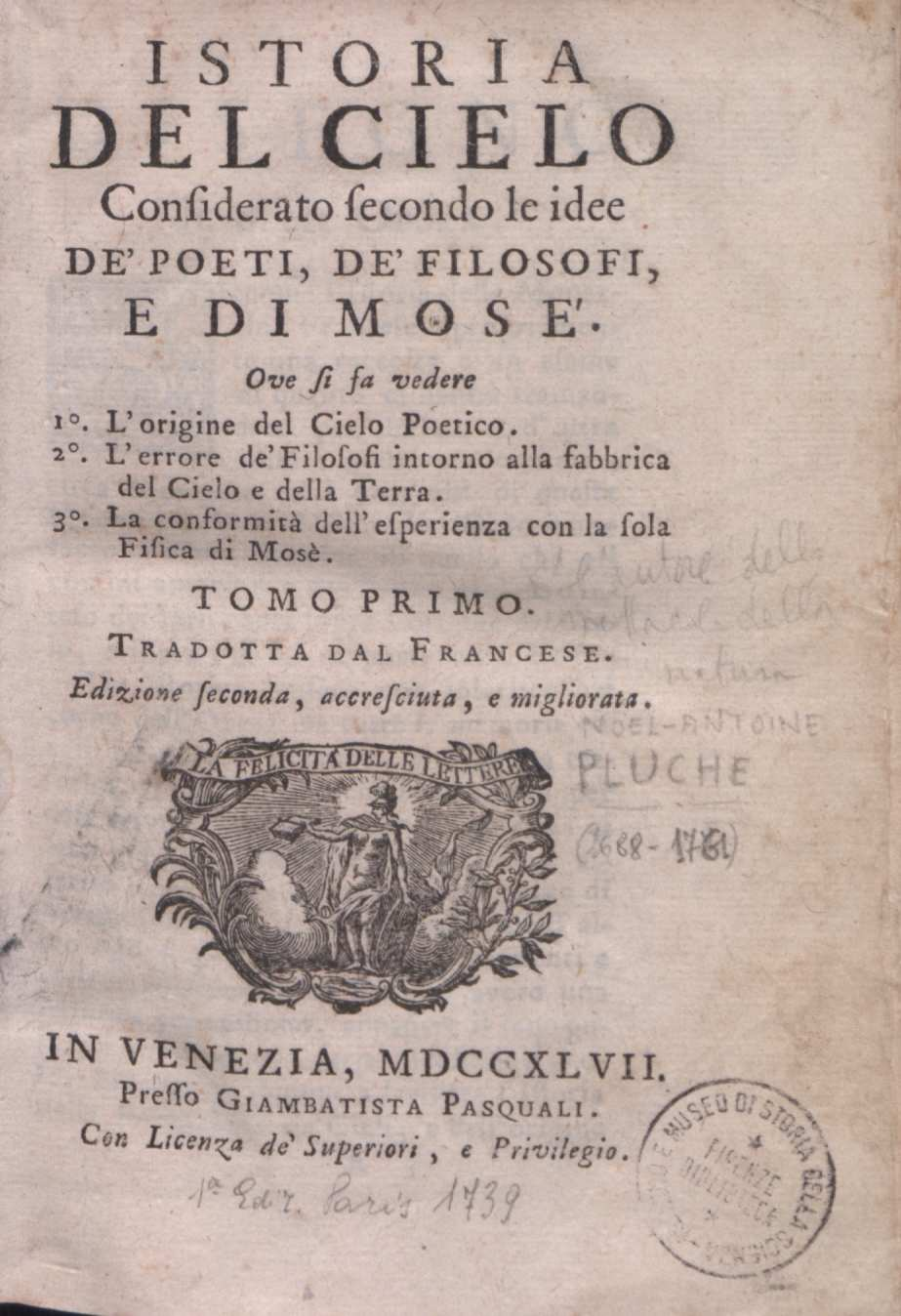
Istoria del cielo considerato secondo le idee de' poeti, de' filosofi, e di Mosè, 1747

- Le spectacle de la nature, ou Entretiens sur les particularités de l'histoire naturelle qui ont paru les plus propres à piquer la curiosité de la jeunesse et à lui former l'esprit. 7 volumes. Bar-le-Duc: L. Guérin. 1732–1742.
- Histoire du ciel considéré selon les idées des poètes, des philosophes et de Moïse. Paris: Vve Estienne. 1739.
- La Mécanique des langues et l'art de les enseigner. Translated in the same year into Latin with the title De Linguarum artificio et doctrina. Paris: Vve Estienne et fils. 1751.
- Harmonie des pseaumes et de l'Evangile ou traduction des pseaumes et des cantiques de l'Eglise avec des notes. Paris: Frères Estienne. 1761.
- Concorde de la géographie des différents âges. posthumous. Paris: Frères Estienne. 1764.

== Sources ==
- Biographical note at Biographies rémoises.
