= James Crombie =

James Crombie may refer to:

- James Crombie (minister) (1730–1790), Scottish Presbyterian minister, founder of Belfast Academy
- James Crombie (politician) (1834–1898), politician in colonial Queensland
- James Edward Crombie (1862–1932), Scottish philanthropist, meteorologist and seismologist
- James Crombie (civil servant) (1902–1969), English civil servant
- James Mascall Morrison Crombie, Scottish lichenologist
- James Crombie (badminton), Scottish badminton player
