= Abercrombie Lawson =

Abercrombie Anstruther Lawson FRSE FLS (13 September 1870 – 26 March 1927) was a botanist, foundation professor of botany at the University of Sydney.

== Early life ==
Lawson was born in Hamilton, Ontario, Canada, the fourth son of William Lawson.

== Career ==
In 1909 he was elected a Fellow of the Royal Society of Edinburgh. His proposers were Frederick Orpen Bower, Robert Kidston, Sir Isaac Bayley Balfour, and Ramsay Heatley Traquair. He won the Society's Makdougall-Brisbane Prize for the period 1916-1918.
