= Johann Bachstrom =

- Born: December 24, 1688 near Rawicz, Polish–Lithuanian Commonwealth
- Died: 1742; Nieśwież, Polish–Lithuanian Commonwealth
- Occupations: writer, scientist, Lutheran theologian

Jan Fryderyk or Johann Friedrich Bachstrom (24 December 1688, near Rawicz, Poland - June 1742, Nieśwież, now Nyasvizh, Belarus) was a writer, scientist and Lutheran theologian who spent the last decade of his life in Leiden. His surname is sometimes spelt Bachstroem or Bachstrohm. He mostly wrote in Latin, German, and French (with his given names adjusted to Joannis Friderici and Jean-Frédéric as appropriate), while in English biographies he can appear as John Frederic Bachstrom. Since he is best known for his publications while he was in the Netherlands, he is often mistakenly described as a Dutch physician and writer.

In Observationes circa scorbutum ("Observations on Scurvy"), Bachstrom wrote that scurvy is solely owing to a total abstinence from fresh vegetable food, and greens; which is alone the primary cause of the disease.

== Early life ==
Bachstrom was born in 1688 the son of a barber near Rawicz, Poland. By 1708 he studied theology in Halle and since March 1710 in Jena in Germany. He moved to Stroppen in Silesia to become a preacher, but was refused based on doubts about his orthodoxy. In 1717 he became a professor at the gymnasium of Toruń. He was expelled from this city after a heterodox sermon had resulted in much disorder. He moved to Węgrów, then a centre for Reformation movements in Poland, where he combined the offices of physician and pastor. By 1729 he, somehow, was in Constantinople where he established a printing shop and undertook to translate the Bible into Turkish. This led to much consternation and he was once more compelled to flee a city.

== Leiden and treatise on scurvy ==
He may have gone directly to Leiden, from where his studies appeared from the early 1730s. Many of his opinions appear common sense but ahead of his time. For example, he promoted that women should be allowed to become medical doctors and that sailors should be taught to swim before taking off to sea. Most famously, he urged the use of fresh fruit and vegetables to cure scurvy. In his 1734 book Observationes circa scorbutum ("Observations on Scurvy"), he wrote that:-

"scurvy is solely owing to a total abstinence from fresh vegetable food, and greens; which is alone the primary cause of the disease."

This publication preceded James Lind's celebrated experiment on scurvy by 13 years and Lind's publication A treatise of the scurvy by 19 years, and he has been called "the one light of the era who, more than any other writer for centuries before or decades after, truly understood scurvy as a deficiency disease." Bachstrom's book probably was dismissed in its time as it did not fit in the then prevailing holistic views in medicine, which sought to explain all diseases by a single theory and to cure them by a universal cure.

== Novelist ==
In 1736/37 he published, anonymously, a novel describing a utopian society established by shipwrecked religious dissidents (the Inqviraner) near an unnamed North-African mountain range, in which complete religious freedom existed. The novel drew from his own experiences of his time in Constantinople and on French and British novels, like Montesquieu's Lettres persanes and Defoe's Robinson Crusoe.

At the urging of Jesuits, presumably for his liberal opinions on religion, he was imprisoned and killed (by strangulation) in Nieswiez in Poland–Lithuania (now Belarus) in 1742.

== Books ==
- Observationes circa scorbutum : ejusque indolem, causas, signa, et curam, institutæ, eorum præprimis in usum, qui Groenlandiam & Indiam Orientis petunt. Leiden, Conrad Wishoff, 1734
- Nova aestus marini theoria, Leiden, 1734
- Bey zwei hundert Jahr lang unbekannte, nunmehro aber entdeckte vortreffliche Land der Inqviraner: : Aus der Erzehlung Eines nach langwieriger Kranckheit in unsern Gegenden verstorbenen Aeltesten dieses glückseligen Landes, Nach allen seinen Sitten, Gebräuchen, Ordnungen, Gottesdienst, Wissenschafften, Künsten, Vortheilen und Einrichtung umständlich beschrieben, Und dem gemeinen Wesen zum Besten mitgetheilet. Breslau (probably not Frankfurt, as usually quoted), 1736/37
- L'Art de Nager, ou Invention à l'aide de laquelle on peut toujours se sauver du Naufrage; &, en cas de besoin, fair passer les plus larges Rivières à les Armées entières. Amsterdam, Zacharie Chatelain, 1741. Though called "The Art of Swimming" this book is about life-saving and mostly describes his invention of a life-jacket (made out of cork).
