= Josephine Abercrombie =

American horsewoman (1926–2022)

- Born: Josephine Avalona Abercrombie; January 15, 1926; Kingston, Jamaica
- Died: January 5, 2022 (aged 95); Versailles, Kentucky, U.S.
- Occupations: thoroughbred owner and breeder; philanthropist
- Spouse: five times divorced
- Children: Two sons, Jamie Abercrombie Robinson and George Anderson Robinson
- Parents: Lillie Frank; James Smither Abercrombie (married May 6, 1925)

Josephine Avalona Abercrombie (January 15, 1926 – January 5, 2022) was an American horsewoman, businesswoman, boxing promoter, philanthropist, and founder of The Lexington School in Lexington, Kentucky.

== Early life and education ==
Abercrombie was the daughter of Lillie Frank of Lake Charles, Louisiana and Houston oilman James Smither Abercrombie. She rode Quarter Horses on her father's ranch in west Texas then began taking lessons to ride a saddle horse before she was ten. That led to her competing in horse shows, including the Madison Square Garden where she won twelve blue ribbons at the 1953 National Horse Show. She traveled back and forth to board school between shows in a private jet. She graduated from Pine Manor Junior College then Rice University in 1946.

== Pin Oak Stud ==
Abercrombie first came to the Keeneland Yearling Sale with her father in 1949, and in 1952 they built Pin Oak Farm in Woodford County, Kentucky. Their early success included graded stakes winners such as Make A Play, Roman Patrol and Elocutionist. By 1987, Ms. Abercrombie had purchased a new Pin Oak Farm not far from the original one, and she established a thoroughbred breeding operation with sires such as Sky Classic, Peaks and Valleys, Maria's Mon and Broken Vow.

In 1995, the Thoroughbred Owners and Breeders Association recognized Pin Oak Stud as the state and national Thoroughbred Breeder of the Year. In that same year Canada's Sovereign Award went to Peaks and Valleys for Canadian Horse of the Year and Canadian Champion 3-year-old colt. The Pin Oak Stable currently houses nearly 40 broodmares and the stallions Bob and John, Cowboy Cal, Broken Vow and Sky Classic.

Upon Josephine Abercrombie's death the stud was sold and bought by James Bernhard in November 2022.

== Houston Boxing Association ==
In 1982, Abercrombie started the Houston Boxing Association and within four years was hosting nearly 50 fights in a single year. With a nutritionist, her signed boxers lived rent free in an apartment complex and trained in custom exercise facilities in Houston or traveled to her Abercrombie Cannonade Ranch near Gonzales Texas. Abercrombie provided her boxers with health-care insurance as well as profit-sharing benefits. Among the boxers she promoted were International Boxing Hall of Fame members Mike Tyson and Orlando Canizales as well as fellow world champions Frank Tate and Calvin Grove, and a young prospect, Lou Savarese.

== Philanthropy ==
=== Rice University ===
Rice University received gifts of at least $4.6 million from Abercrombie and acknowledged their gratitude when they created the Legacy Society and included her in it. Her work as a member of the Rice University Board of Trustees left a lasting impression on the campus. Her work on the building and grounds committee began in 1979, directing patronage in supporting high quality architectural projects in new buildings, continued even after her retirement from the board in 1994.

=== Kentucky Equine Humane Center ===
Abercrombie cofounded the nonprofit Kentucky Equine Humane Center which works closely with the state's major thoroughbred racetracks (Turfway, Keeneland, Churchill Downs and Ellis Park), where owners can surrender unwanted horses directly from a training or racing stable. The Center opened in 2007 in Nicholasville, Kentucky, and no horse is turned away nor are fees required for surrendering a horse to them.

=== The Lexington School ===
One of Abercrombie's more beloved results of her philanthropy is a private K-8 school, The Lexington School, located in Lexington, Kentucky. It opened in the fall of 1959. In honor of her 90th birthday, The Lexington School created a video that included a variety of images of her early life and the beginning of the school: "A Birthday Salute to Ms. A" (January 25, 2016).

== Political affiliations ==
Abercrombie was a strong supporter of the Republican Party but also contributed to the political campaigns of certain Kentucky Democrats.

== Personal life and death ==
Abercrombie was married and divorced five times and had two sons.

In 1950, she married Argentinian architect Fernando H. Segura (1916–2013). Her two sons, Jamie Abercrombie Robinson (1957–) and George Anderson Robinson (1959–) were born in Houston where they continue to live.

In 1964, she married Tony Bryan, a Harvard graduate and Royal Canadian Air Force pilot. He became president and CEO of J.S. Abercrombie's Cameron Iron Works in 1973 and fourteen years later they divorced.

She died in Versailles, Woodford County, Kentucky, on January 5, 2022, aged 95.

== Other resources ==
- Nicholson, Patrick J. (1983). Mr. Jim: The Biography of James Smither Abercrombie. Houston: Gulf. ISBN 9780872014046.
- "Interview with Josephine Abercrombie, March 21, 2007; interviewer, Dan Kenny". 2007OH082 HIK 020 Horse Industry in Kentucky Oral History Project. Louie B. Nunn Center for Oral History, University of Kentucky Libraries.
- "History". Pin Oak Stud.
- "October 2016 Member of the Month: Joesphine Abercrombie". Thoroughbred Owners & Breeders Association. 10 October 2016.
- Rogers, Karen Hess; Pecht, Lee; Bath, Alan Harris (2012). Rice University: One Hundred Years in Pictures. College Station: Texas A&M University Press. p. 75.
- "Town and Country, 1954". Rice History Corner: Gleanings from the Rice University Archives. Rice University. 2 July 2014.
