= John Crombie =

John Crombie may refer to:

- John Crombie (Royal Navy officer) (1900–1972), Scottish Royal Navy admiral
- John Crombie (minister) (1789–1872), minister of the Church of Scotland
- John William Crombie (1858–1908), Scottish woollen manufacturer, folklorist and politician
- John Nicol Crombie (1827–1878), New Zealand photographer and businessman

== See also ==
- Jonathan Crombie (1966–2015), Canadian actor
