= Thomas Abercrombie =

Thomas Abercrombie may refer to:

- Thomas A. Abercrombie (1951–2019), American professor of anthropology at New York University
- Thomas Abercrombie (basketball) (born 1987), New Zealand basketball player
- Thomas J. Abercrombie (1930–2006), American adventurer, photographer and writer for National Geographic
