= John H. and Mary Abercrombie House =

Historic house in Indiana, United States

- U.S. National Register of Historic Places
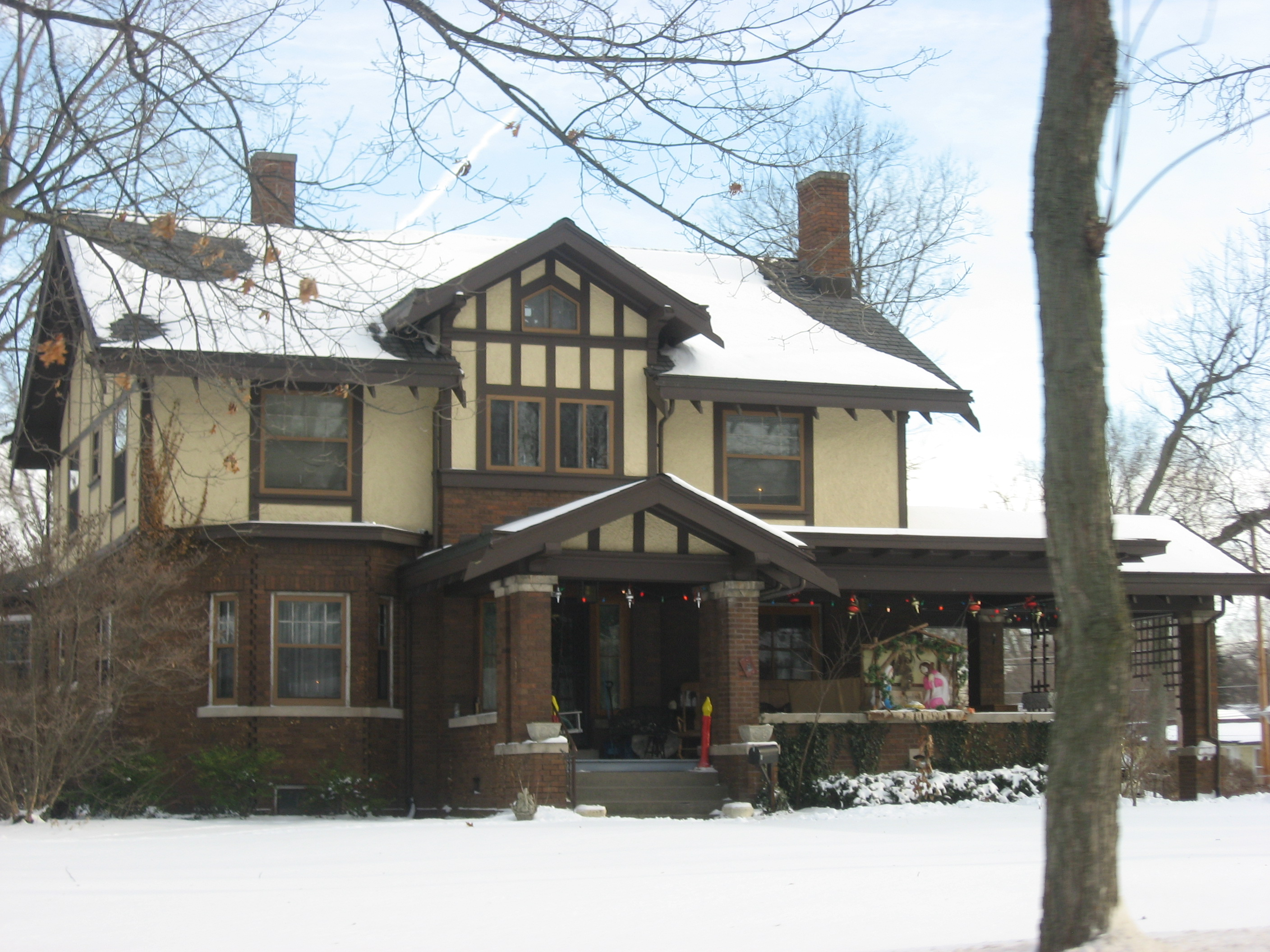
- John H. and Mary Abercrombie House, January 2014

- Location within Indiana Location within the United States
- Location: 3130 Parnell Ave., Fort Wayne, Indiana
- Coordinates: 41°06′16″N 85°07′42″W
- Area: 1.0 acre (0.40 ha)
- Built: c. 1914
- Architectural style: Tudor Revival, Bungalow / craftsman
- NRHP reference No.: 13000418
- Added to NRHP: June 25, 2013

John H. and Mary Abercrombie House is a historic home located at Fort Wayne, Indiana. It was built about 1914, and is a two-story, side gabled, Tudor Revival style brick and half-timber dwelling. It has American Craftsman style design elements including wide gabled porches, exposed rafter ends, and a porte cochere.

Originally owned by Nettie and John Adams, Mary (née McClure) and John Abercrombie purchased the home from them and moved in around 1915. John H. Abercrombie was the son of Scottish immigrants. His father, James Abercrombie, lived for a time in California, where he earned a "snug fortune" by mining for gold, before settling in New Brighton, Pennsylvania (where John was born) and then in Kalamazoo, Michigan, where he worked as an engineer for the Grand Rapids and Indiana Railroad. John Abercrombie worked for the same railroad company as a locomotive engineer. He met his future wife, Mary, after moving to Fort Wayne in the 1890s. Mary McClure was born in Claysburg, Pennsylvania before moving to Fort Wayne, where she worked as an elementary school teacher. The Abercrombies sold the home to the Citizens Trust Company in 1924.

It was listed on the National Register of Historic Places in 2013.
