= David Abercrombie (linguist) =

British linguist (1909–1992)

David Abercrombie (19 December 1909 – 4 July 1992) was a British phonetician who established the Department of Phonetics at the University of Edinburgh. He was a student of J. R. Firth and Daniel Jones. He retired as Professor of Phonetics in 1980 and died in Edinburgh at the age of 82.

== Biography ==
Abercrombie was born in Birkenhead on 19 December 1909. His father, Lascelles Abercrombie was a poet and his mother was Catherine, née Gwatkin, one of his three younger siblings was Michael Abercrombie, biologist. He grew up in Ryton, Gloucestershire, before returning to Cheshire on the outbreak of World War I, and moving to Leeds in 1922, when his father became the chair of English Literature at Leeds University.

He attended Leeds Grammar School as a child before studying at English at Leeds University. He went on to complete his post graduate education in phonetics at University College London under Daniel Jones.

In 1948, he gained a position at the University of Edinburgh teaching Phonetics; by 1964 he was appointed a professor.

== Bibliography ==
- Abercrombie, David (1964). English phonetic texts. London: Faber and Faber.
- Abercrombie, David (1965). Studies in phonetics and linguistics. London: Oxford University Press.
- Abercrombie, David (1967). Elements of general phonetics. Edinburgh: Edinburgh University Press.
- Abercrombie, David (1991). Fifty years in phonetics. Edinburgh: Edinburgh University Press.
- Kelly, J. (1993). "David Abercrombie". Phonetica. 50: 68–71. doi:10.1159/000261926.
