= John Abercromby (monk) =

Purported Benedictine monk

- Died: 1561
- Cause of death: Execution
- Occupation: Benedictine monk (supposed)
- Known for: Supposed writer of Veritatis Defensio and Hæreseos Confusio

John Abercromby (fl. 1561) was, according to Thomas Dempster's Historia ecclesiastica (1829), a Benedictine monk who was executed for his Roman Catholicism. However, his identity is doubtful: "Abercromby has not come to light in recent scholarly work, nor is he found in the published records... The only possible conclusion is that John Abercromby is a figment, a 'ghost' fabricated by Thomas Dempster."

According to the 1885 Dictionary of National Biography, he was the author of Veritatis Defensio and Hæreseos Confusio.
