= Abercrombie, Fife =

Coordinates: 56°13′02″N 2°46′38″W

Abercrombie: Scots: Obar Chrombaidh
- Location within Fife
- OS grid reference: NO517027
- Council area: Fife
- Lieutenancy area: Fife
- Country: Scotland
- Sovereign state: United Kingdom
- Police: Scotland
- Fire: Scottish
- Ambulance: Scottish
- UK Parliament: North East Fife
- Scottish Parliament: North East Fife

Abercrombie (Gaelic: Obar Chrombaidh) is a village in Fife, Scotland.

Abercrombie, recorded in 1157-60 as Abercrumbin, means 'mouth of the river Crombie'. The first element is the Pictish word aber 'river mouth'. Crombie is a stream-name derived from the Gaelic word crombadh 'bending, winding'. This Gaelic stream-name probably replaced an earlier Pictish name. The only stream near here entering the sea is the Inverie Burn, also known as St. Monan's Burn, which discharges at St. Monan's. We might suppose that Crombadh was an earlier name for the burn.

Abercrombie is situated 1 mi (1.6 km) north of the village of St Monans, and 8.4 mi (13.5 km) miles south of the town of St Andrews. Abercrombie was the former name of the parish of St Monans, although both Abercrombie and St Monans had churches.

The hamlet is centred on Abercrombie Farmstead, dating from 1892, which was built on the site of an earlier 13th-century building.

The land around Abercrombie was formerly owned by the Sandilands family and Sir James Sandilands was raised to the Peerage of Scotland as Lord Abercrombie in 1647. Lord Abercrombie wasted his estates following the death of his father and had to sell his properties in Fife in 1649. The title became extinct on the death of the second Lord Abercrombie in 1681.
