= David Abercromby =

Scottish physician and writer

David Abercromby was a 17th-century Scottish physician and writer, thought to have died in 1702. Brought up at Douai as a Roman Catholic by Jesuit priests, he was converted to Protestantism in 1682 and came to abjure popery, and published Protestancy proved Safer than Popery (1686).

== Works ==
His medical reputation was based on his Tuta ac efficax luis venereae saepe absque mercurio ac semper absque salivatione mercuriali curando methodus (1684) which was translated into French, Dutch and German. Two other works by him were De Pulsus Variatione (1685), and Ars explorandi medicas facultates plantarum ex solo sapore (1688); his Opuscula were collected in 1687. These professional writings gave him a place and memorial in Albrecht von Haller, Bibliotheca Medicinae Practicae (1779). According to Haller he was alive early in the 18th century.

He also wrote some books in theology and philosophy, controversial in their time but little remembered today. But the most noticeable of his productions is A Discourse of Wit (1685), which contains some of the most characteristic metaphysical opinions of the Scottish philosophy of common sense. It was followed by Academia Scientiarum (1687), and by A Moral Discourse of the Power of Interest (1690), dedicated to Robert Boyle, Abercromby's patron in the 1680s. He later wrote Reasons Why A Protestant Should not Turn Papist (1687), which has often wrongly been attributed to Boyle. A Short Account of Scots Divines, by him, was printed at Edinburgh in 1833, edited by James Maidment.
