= Inchdrewer Castle =

16th-century tower house in Banff, UK

- Southwest of Banff, Aberdeenshire
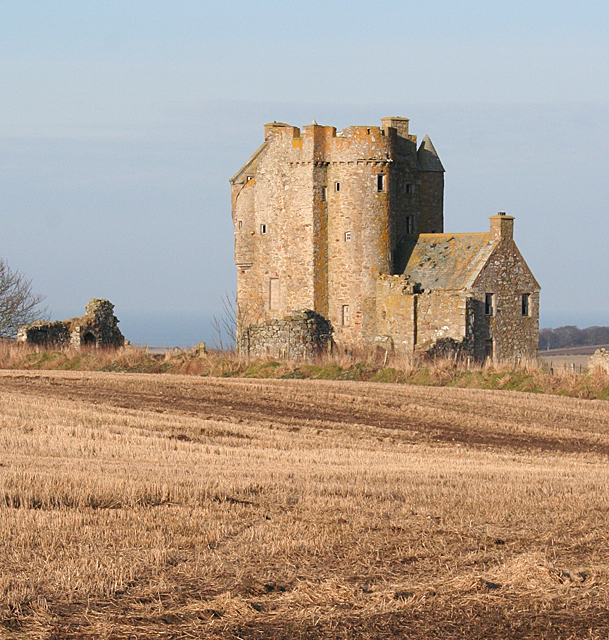
- Inchdrewer Castle in 2011

Site information
- Owner: Olga Roh
- Open to the public: No
- Condition: Ruined

Location
- Location within Aberdeenshire
- Coordinates: 57°38′06″N 2°34′40″W grid reference NJ6550560672

Site history
- Built: c. 1500
- In use: Jacobite rising of 1745
- Materials: Ashlar rubble

Inchdrewer Castle is a 16th-century tower house in the parish of Banff, Aberdeenshire, in the north-east of Scotland. Situated on a slight rise 3.5 miles (5.6 km) south-west of Banff, it looks across to Banff Bay. Originally owned by the Currour family, it was purchased by the Ogilvies of Dunlugas in 1557 and became their main family seat. The Ogilvies were staunch Royalists, which resulted in the castle coming under attack from the Covenanters in 1640. George Ogilvy, 3rd Lord Banff was murdered in 1713 and his body hidden inside the castle, which was then set on fire. The castle came under siege again in 1746, during the Jacobite rising of 1745–46. At the start of the 19th century, following the death of the 8th Lord Banff, the property was inherited by the Abercromby of Birkenbog family, who leased it to a tenant. It became uninhabited after 1836 and the structure deteriorated.

Over the following century the neglect continued until some basic external renovation work was undertaken between 1965 and 1971, making the structure wind and water tight, although it remained unoccupied. The castle was again abandoned and left unmaintained. The condition of the building further declined, becoming derelict. It was in a ruinous state when marketed for sale in April 2013 after the death of Count Robin Mirrlees, who had owned it for about fifty years. At the end of that year it was purchased by the former model Olga Roh, who said she intended to restore it. Modern day reports suggest that the spirit of the 3rd Lord Banff and that of a white dog haunt the castle, which is classified as a category A listed building.

== Early history ==
The castle's exact construction date is unknown, but it was some time in the early to mid 16th century, during the reign of either James IV or James V. Various spellings are used: Inch Druar (or Inchdruar as one word); Inchdruer; Inchdrewir; or Inchdrewr. Originally owned by the Curror (Currour) family, in 1557 it was purchased by Walter Ogilvie of Dunlugas (1509–58), and became the main family seat.

James Currour was a notary in Banff and is linked with several of Dunlugas' contracts and witnessing leases. The Currour family continued to style themselves "lairds of Inchdrewer". In August 1599, George Currour, feuar of Inchdrewer and son of Walter Currour of Inchdrewer, was involved in a dispute involving the family pew at the Kirk of Inverboyndie.

During the late 16th century, the Dunlugas Ogilvies undertook refurbishment and extension work, including the addition of courtyard buildings and a distinctive circular tower that incorporated the hall into its first storey. An act recording the lands in favour of George Ogilvy was ratified by King Charles I in late June 1633. George was the son of Walter Ogilvy, and an ardent Royalist and supporter of the king against the Covenanters. Inchdrewer Castle was left in ruins after being attacked by Covenanter forces led by General Robert Monro in 1640; another of the family properties, a town house, was also devastated. George Ogilvy was appointed a peer in 1642, becoming the first Lord Banff.

George Ogilvy, 3rd Lord Banff, inherited the property when his father, the 2nd Lord Banff, died on 10 September 1668. He was murdered in 1713 and the castle destroyed by fire; his body had been concealed inside. (Note: McKean states:"It was burnt, Lord Banff within, in 1713".) Restoration work was once more undertaken. (Note: Details of the date and work undertaken are not specified: "Evidently it was again re-built ...")

The castle came under attack by troops led by the Duke of Cumberland in 1746 during the Jacobite rebellion. Yet more restoration work was carried out during the later part of the century.

When William Ogilvy, 8th Lord Banff, died on 4 June 1803, the estate was inherited by his sister Jean (sometimes named Jane), who had married George Abercromby (Abercrombie) of Birkenbog. Her son, Sir Robert Abercromby succeeded her. Sir Robert was appointed as a member of Parliament for the Banff constituency in 1812 but four years later claimed financial difficulties prevented him seeking re-election. In 1820, he asked George IV to allow the Banff peerage, which had become dormant or extinct when the 8th Lord Banff died, to continue by declaring his mother Baroness Banff, or granting him the title of Lord Banff, but the request was denied.

The main residence of the Abercrombys was at Forglen House, Turriff. The castle was in a sufficient state of repair to be leased to tenants until 1836. MacGibbon and Ross refer to the castle as being in the ownership of Sir R. J. Abercromby of Birkenbog when writing about it in their architectural book published in 1887. The ground-floor plan given in the book shows two parts of the building as being "ruinous".

The castle was abandoned at the beginning of the 20th century, and it soon became dilapidated.

== Later history ==
Layout of the ground floor of Inchdrewer Castle in 1887

The castle was purchased by Count Robin Mirrlees in 1962 or 1963. (Note: Various dates of purchase by Mirrlees are given in different sources; Ballantynes gives 1963, whereas the Buildings at Risk register shows 1971.) Renovation work was possibly undertaken in 1965 by architect Oliver Hill, although his undated drawings may not have been fully implemented. After visiting the property in 1966, Nigel Tranter, author and historian, reported that work had begun on the structure but described it as a "ruinous shell of a house". Some structural restoration work was undertaken and the castle was slightly repaired, sufficient to have made it "wind and watertight" by 1971. But it was then abandoned again, and further deterioration occurred; it had been uninhabitable since 1836, and Mirlees never lived in it. Internally, only basic work was undertaken. Local residents believed the only time the interior was used during this period was when a ceremony was held to site a plaque commemorating the completion of external work in 1971.

Historic Scotland designated Inchdrewer Castle a category A listed building in February 1972. The poor condition of the property was highlighted in a report expressing concern by the Scottish Civic Trust in 1999. Inspections by Aberdeenshire Council officials described it as "showing signs of a lack of maintenance" in February 2008, with all its windows broken. Further decline was noted in October 2010, and the castle was said to be "on the cusp of ruination". Further deterioration was noted when the castle was visited in December 2012.

Mirlees died on 23 June 2012. Together with the title of "Baron of Inchdrewer" the castle ruins were put up for sale in April 2013, and purchased in November 2013 for about £400,000 by Olga Roh, former Valentino and Versace model and owner of Rohmir. Roh had never been to Scotland and had not seen the castle before she bought it, but said she planned to restore it so it could be used for fashion shoots, as a film location, or as a residence. Other suggestions were used as a holiday destination for friends or a boutique hotel. The restoration was being led by Marc Ellington until his death in 2021.

== Architecture ==
Layout of the first floor of Inchdrewer Castle in 1887

Starting as a basic L-shaped tower built from tooled ashlar dressed rubble, the castle was extended in a southerly direction by the addition of a circular tower during the first alterations in the late 16th century. A staircase was inside the new tower and further structures were added to the south and north sides of the courtyard at this stage of the development. Replacement entrances were installed and the original first-floor doorway was closed off. Access on the west side was gained through a narrow round-headed entrance and a wider main doorway were incorporated in the south elevation.

Some of the architectural features incorporated throughout the castle included: corbelled battlemented wallheads on the towers; turrets set above first or second storey level; a large elongated aperture provided light on the first floor hall; and shot holes in the south-west tower. The fenestrations on the wing added in the late 18th century differed from those used in the earlier parts of the structure, being larger and more regular in appearance.

The restorations completed in 1971 made the structure wind and water tight, added extra windows and installed fresh glazing, but as it was then abandoned again, weather elements exacerbated by vandalism led to further structural deterioration. The castle was in a ruinous condition in 2013 and unfit for habitation.

== Superstition and haunting ==
Twenty-first century newspaper stories report that the ghost of the murdered George Ogilvy, 3rd Lord Banff, haunts the castle. Nigel Tranter visited Inchdrewer again in the 1970s and a large white dog, which he speculated may have been a Samoyed, bounded out of the castle as he approached it with a local builder. Unable to explain how the dog could have been confined in the castle for seven days, he was later sent a copy of the magazine Vogue, in which it was stated that the castle was "haunted by a lady in the shape of a white dog".
