= Forglen House =

Mansion in the parish of Forglen in Scotland

Coordinates: 57°33′20″N 2°30′17″W

Designations

Inventory of Gardens and Designed Landscapes in Scotland
- Official name: Forglen
- Designated: 30 June 2011
- Reference no.: GDL00398

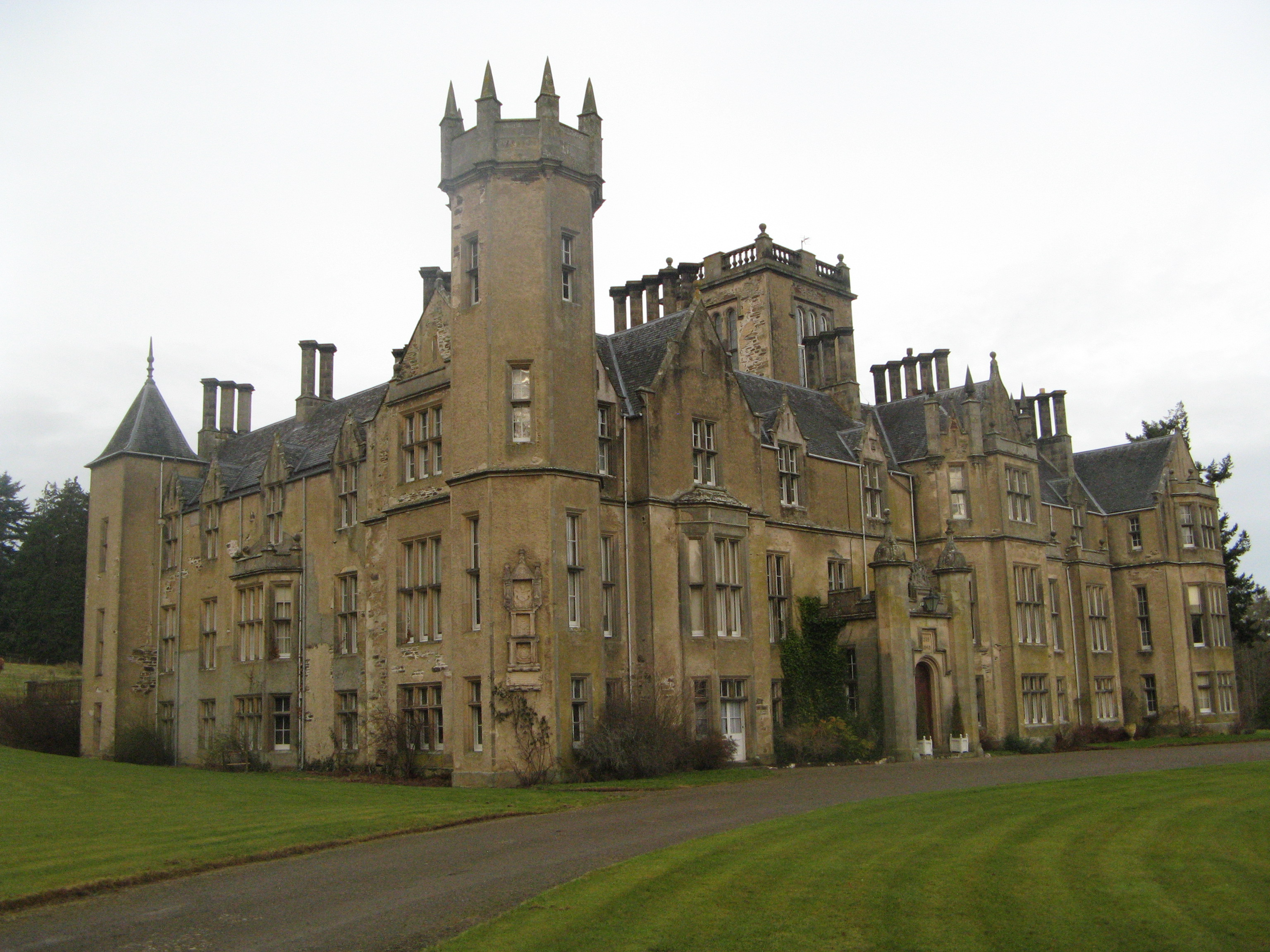
Forglen House

Forglen House is a mansion house that forms the centrepiece of the Forglen estate in the parish of Forglen, north-west of Turriff, Aberdeenshire, in the north-east of Scotland. The lands were given to the abbots of the Abbey of Arbroath by King William the Lion before 1211 and the Monymusk Reliquary was held there. The original castle, built around 1346, was replaced by a vernacular harled house that was later extended. Significant development of the estate began when it was acquired by the family of Lord Banff and they started the work of landscaping and planting trees. It became their main family seat during the 18th century. After the death of William Ogilvy, the eighth and final Lord Banff, the estate passed by marriage to the Abercromby baronets who continued to enhance the property and maintained it as their main residence. Sir Robert Abercromby, 5th Baronet commissioned the Aberdeen City Architect, John Smith to design the present house in 1839.

Forglen House was sold by the Abercromby family in 1974 but remains in private ownership. It is not open to the public, although access to the grounds is available and some cottages can be hired as holiday lets, including one of the lodge houses.

The mansion is a Category A listed building and several other structures within the estate, including the stables and a Gothic-style mausoleum, are Category B listed. The gardens are listed on the Inventory of Gardens and Designed Landscapes in Scotland as outstanding in most sections.

== History ==
Location of Forglen House in Aberdeenshire

The estate of Forglen (Foithir Gleann, meaning "the hollow of the vale" in Gaelic) was one of the parcels of land added to the property of the abbots at the Abbey of Arbroath by King William the Lion prior to 1211. Charters indicate the Monymusk Reliquary (Note: Now held by the National Museum of Scotland who describe it as "one of [its] most treasured objects") or Breccbennach was probably held at Forglen and the tenants were required to ride under the standard of the Arbroath abbots if called to defend king and kingdom. Forglen remained under the Abbey's feudal superiority until the superiority passed to the Marquis of Hamilton in 1608. Thirty-nine years later, in 1641, the feudal superior was William Murray, 1st Earl of Dysart and then, in 1642, it was the Maules of Panmure. (Note: The OED defines feudal(ism) as: the dominant social system in medieval Europe, in which the nobility held lands from the Crown in exchange for military service, and vassals were in turn tenants of the nobles, while the peasants (villeins or serfs) were obliged to live on their lord’s land and give him homage, labour, and a share of the produce, notionally in exchange for military protection.)

The first holders of the Forglen land detailed in the charters are Sir Thomas of Monymusk and then his son, Malcolm, is listed in the 1315 charter. Malcolm was probably succeeded by a son, John, who died by 1387. The following generations produced no male heirs so the land was inherited by his daughters. Alexander Irvine of Drum raised a successful brieve (writ) mort d'ancestor at a specially arranged court in Aberdeen on 24 January 1414 claiming the lands of Forglen. The session was overseen by the justiciary of the Arbroath abbots and held in the house of Alexander Stewart, Earl of Mar, a known supporter of the Irvine family who had fought alongside him in France and at the Battle of Harlaw, just north of Inverurie. The land continued in Irvine family ownership until 1624 when they sold it to the Urquharts of Craigfintray. George Ogilvy, who later became Lord Banff, acquired Forglen in 1637.

The Ogilvy family were staunch Royalists and their properties, including Forglen, came under attack by the Covenanter forces led by General Robert Monro in 1640. The principal family seat at the time was Inchdrewer Castle and appears to have remained as the main residence until around 1713 when George Ogilvy, 3rd Lord Banff died in a fire there. Sir Alexander Ogilvy, 1st Baronet was the second son of George Ogilvy, 2nd Lord Banff and is described in a 1702 ratification charter signed by Queen Anne as "Alexander Ogilvy of Forglen". He assumed the title of Lord Forglen after his appointment as a Senator of the College of Justice in 1706.

Forglen became the main family residence of the Ogilvy family during the 18th century and marked the onset of significant development of the estate. The 7th Lord Banff, Alexander, who inherited the estate from his grandfather in 1727, began planting trees and organising plantations. He died at Forglen on 1 December 1771. As Alexander's eldest son, also named Alexander, had predeceased him, his second son, William, inherited and became the 8th Lord Banff. William, a former army captain who served under the Duke of York, continued the development of the estate until his death at Forglen on 4 June 1803. The lands were then inherited by William's sister, Lady Jane Abercromby, who had married Sir George Abercromby of Birkenbog and the peerage of Lord Banff became dormant.

The Abercromby baronets owned a significant amount of property in Ireland, as most of the town of Fermoy had been purchased by them from John Anderson in the early 19th century. By 1814 Forglen was used as the main family seat of the Abercromby family; in 1877 they also acquired the 1793-built Dunlugas House, which was sited on the other side of the River Deveron. Lady Jane Abercromby's son, Sir Robert Abercromby, 5th Baronet, continued to enhance the grandeur of the estate policies (Note: the definition of policies as used in Scots land terminology given in the OED is: "The enclosed (and often ornamental) grounds, park, or demesne land surrounding a large country house.") by commissioning the building of a new mansion and several other buildings.

During the Second World War, Forglen was one area that had an Auxiliary Unit Patrol. Auxiliary Units were a top-secret resistance organisation formed down the entire eastern side of the UK. If Germany ever invaded, the patrol would go into hiding in an Operational Base. When the invasion was one to two weeks old, and things settled down, the patrol would come out at night and undertake guerilla warfare. Members of the patrols were trained as explosives experts and were well armed compared to the conventional British Army. Research by Coleshill Auxiliary Research Team has identified the patrol members and an approximate location of the operational base in the estate.

Robert Alexander Abercromby, the 9th Abercromby baronet, died at home on 19 October 1972 and the estate was marketed for sale in 1974. It was subsequently bought by Tristan Russell and his family and remains as of 2018 in their ownership.

== Mansion ==
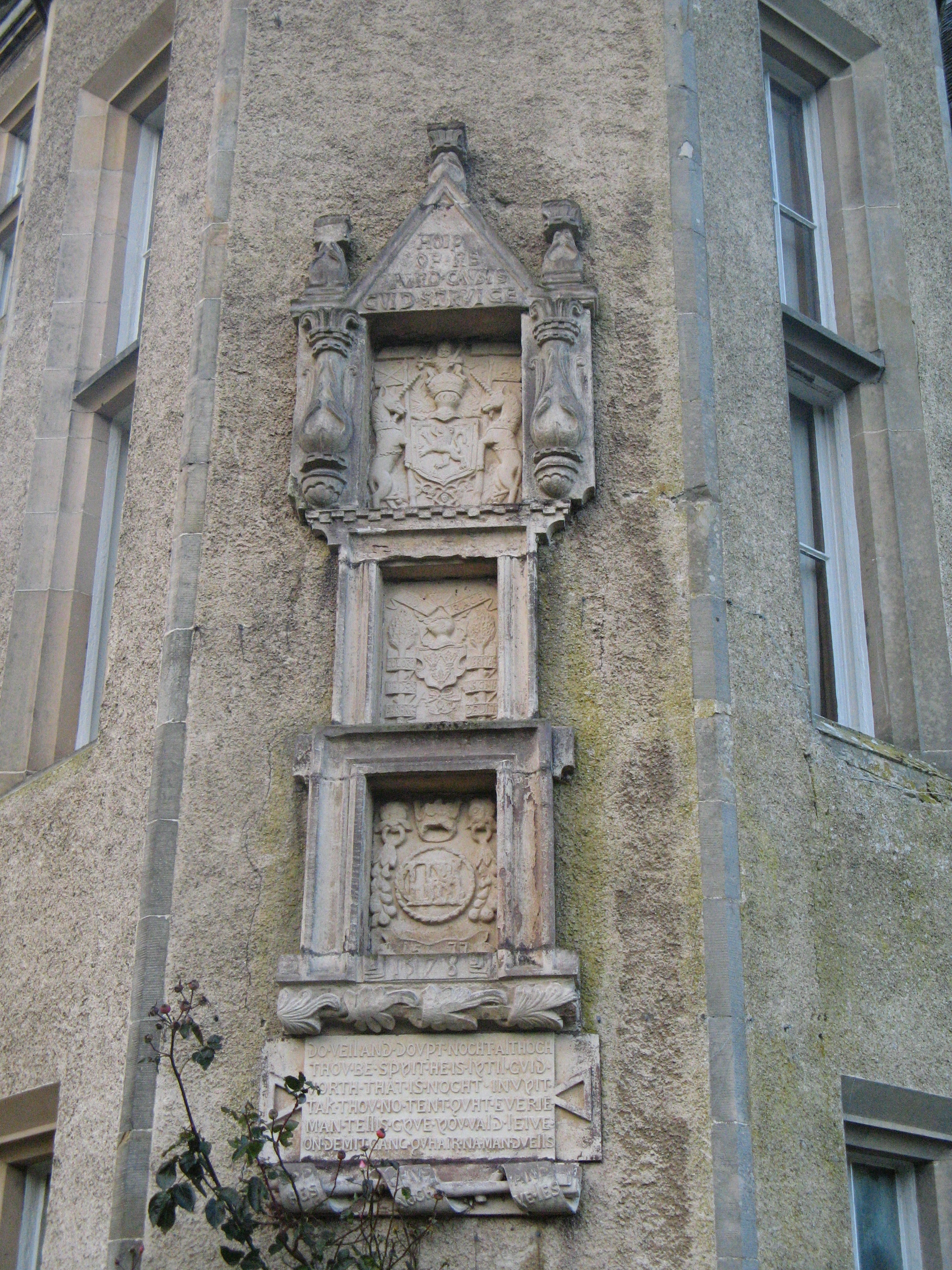
A feature on the 4-storey tower is a triple coat of arms from 1578

The original residence at Forglen, on the left bank of the River Deveron, was constructed around 1346. The first structure was probably a castle but was replaced with a vernacular harled house, (Note: No dates are given for when the castle was replaced by the house.) which had a tower wing extension erected during the late 18th century. In 1839, when Sir Robert Abercromby commissioned the Aberdeen City Architect John Smith to build the present mansion, the old house was demolished but some materials were salvaged and used in the new house. The mansion was constructed over the footprint of the previous structure. Armorial panels and inscriptions from the ancient castle were preserved and set into an octagonal tower.

The cost of building the new mansion was £16,000, equivalent to about £1.4 million as of 2012. (Note: Calculated using the Bank of England's UK price index.) Architectural historian Charles McKean likened the central tower and gatehouse to the style of Robert Smythson and described the mansion house design as an "Elizabethan Gothic confection" that had "all the romantic aspirations of the early 19th century poured into it". The mansion house was designated a Category A listed building by Historic Scotland on 22 February 1972.

=== Exterior ===
Based on a courtyard house layout, externally the harled whinstone rubble mansion is a combination of Elizabethan and Jacobean (or Gothic) design, similar to Smith's work at Slains. A spacious central courtyard is surrounded by buildings three storeys high. Within the back of the courtyard, circular towers enclose the service stairways. A large Elizabethan-style tower housing the main stairway is also set within the courtyard but sited to the front behind the reception rooms. Other external features include: canted and box bays; a variety of lofty towers that are round, square or octagonal; many different gables; and numerous diagonally set stone flues. The south-east facing front elevation lacks symmetry with the main Tudor-style entranceway set off centre and extending out. A plaque commemorating the building dates of 1839–1842 and a central armorial are above the round-arched entrance. There is also an eight-sided tower positioned at the front corner. A separate driveway accesses the outside kitchen yard at the back of the north-west elevation. This side of the mansion is plainer, more restrained and built into the slope of the hillside. A lengthy one storey lean-to houses fuel supplies and servants toilets and provides additional ground support. The north-east elevation is also more architecturally reserved than the front.

=== Interior ===
Internal components embraced a classical style with features like the Corinthian columned screen featured in the Dining Room. The entrance hall has two storeys with a left ascending staircase. Kitchen, service and servant amenities are on the ground floor, as are the gun room, stores and beer and wine cellars. The first floor has a long gallery corridor running the whole length of the inner courtyard. Another pair of Corinthian columns screen the cantilevered staircase from the gallery corridor. Several trompe-l'œil panels and borders are present and the plastered walls mimic timber panelling. Bedrooms were accommodated on the first and second floors. The bedrooms housed within the north-west elevation on the third floor are simple and were used by the servants of visitors if there was insufficient room for them on the ground floor. Polished red granite was used for the mantelpieces.

=== Late 19th-century furnishings ===
An 1895 newspaper description of the furnishings of the mansion relates there are several hunting trophies displayed in the entrance hall. The antler from an elk's skeleton, which had been found buried in the family's Fermoy estate, was mounted in the hall and the width between the tips was reported as more than 8 feet (2.4 m). The dimensions of the long gallery are given as 125 feet (38 m) long with a ceiling height of 15 feet (4.6 m) and 10 feet (3.0 m) wide. Decorated in a deep maroon, steel engravings, drawings and old prints adorn the walls. It was furnished with antiques and an organ was the centrepiece. Some of the first-floor rooms accessed from the gallery were a Ballroom and a Drawing Room. Three arches separated these two rooms and the side arches were fitted with mirrors. Silk damask in a light blue shade was the Ball Room wall covering while satin of a light green colour was used in the Drawing Room. Among the paintings displayed in the Dining Room were family portraits by Henry Raeburn and a painting by John Hoppner was in the Library.

== Gardens and wider estate ==
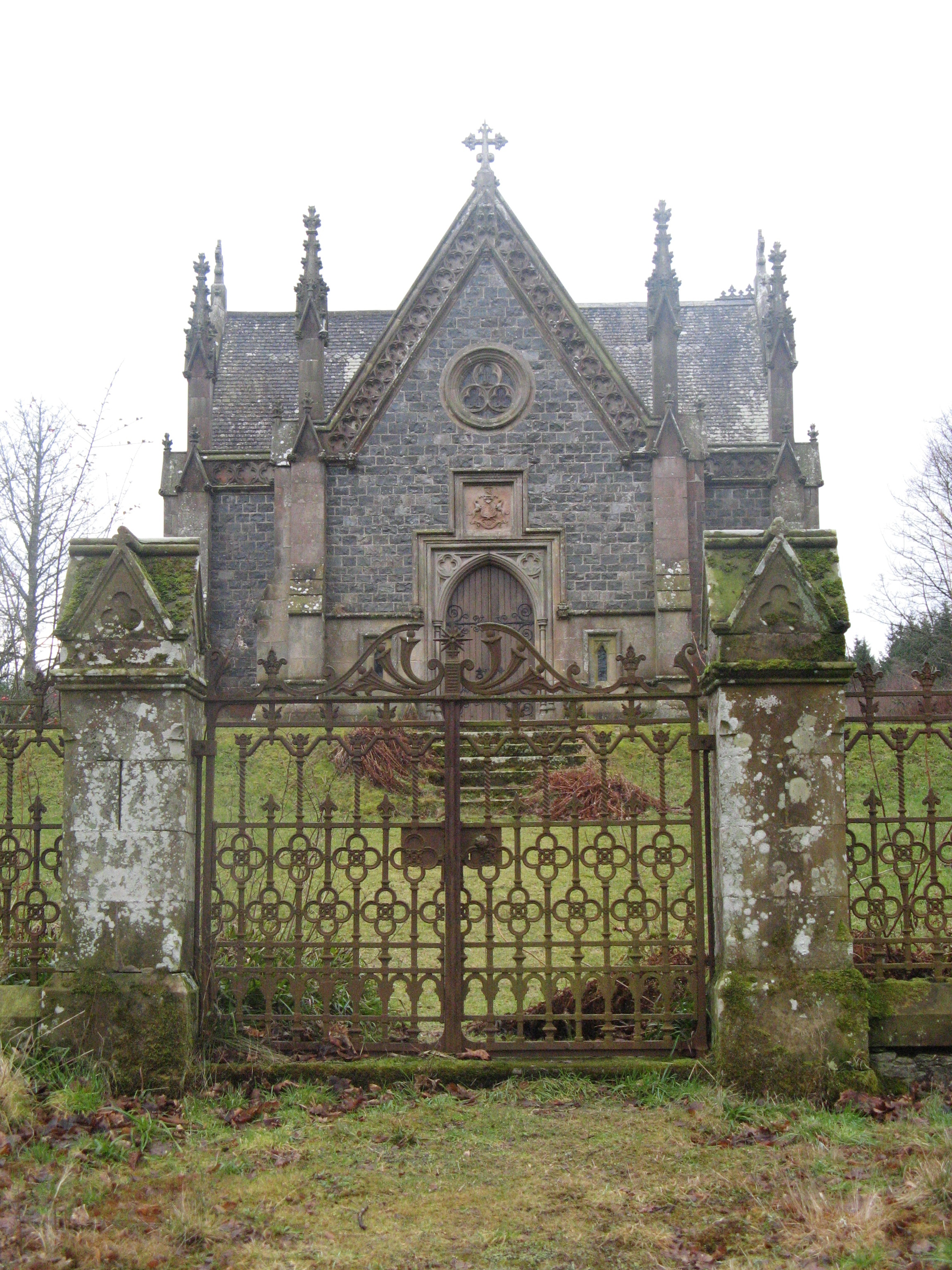
The Gothic-style Mausoleum

The gardens and policies were added to the Inventory of Gardens and Designed Landscapes in Scotland in 2011 because it is an "all-round, outstanding designed landscape". Designated as "outstanding" within six of the seven categories (work of art, historical, horticultural, architectural, scenic and archaeological), it is listed as of high importance in the assessment for the nature conservancy listing.

To the northwest of the mansion is a 15 metres (49 ft) square walled garden. Enclosed inside the 3 metres (9.8 ft) high perimeter walls are greenhouses; and outside are several lean-to stores, potting sheds and a single-storey cottage for the gardener. Category C listed on 15 February 1982, these structures were also designed by Smith in the 19th century.

Several other structures within the policies are listed. These include the Category B listed Gothic style mausoleum constructed in 1865 at a cost of £2,500, equivalent to around £266,000 as at 2012. Built in the shape of a cross, it has a round stained glass window in the front gable and features many gargoyles and other stone decorations. Bodies are interred in the burial ground outside but commemorative stones made of Carrara marble are inside the mausoleum. The corbels on the internal oak roof are embellished with angel figurines.

Among other Category B listed structures are the stables and coach house situated to the south of the mansion. This group of buildings are given as constructed c. 1840 by Historic Scotland but Miller attributes them as being from the time of the previous mansion. The brick built Dovecot, from the early 19th century and the Eastside and North Lodge houses from c. 1865 are also Category B listed.

In 1906 some excavation work was undertaken by Scottish archaeologist J. Graham Callander on a circular tumulus that is within the estate, just over half a mile to the south of the mansion. The mound, in a wooded area known as Meadowheads Wood, is 7 feet (2.1 m) in height and c. 64 feet (20 m) wide. Various relicts and urns were discovered, including three drinking-cup type urns, some of the "highest quality".

== Recent times ==
The mansion and estate remain in private ownership in the 21st century. The Russell family undertook gradual and ongoing restoration and refurbishment of the mansion internally and externally. The roof has been re-slated and some replacement or repair has been carried out to the stonework, harling and guttering. A large number of rooms are no longer used, particularly on the ground and second floors.

The mansion house is not open to the public but walks can be taken through the estate. Several of the cottages are hired out as holiday lets, including one of the lodge houses.

The house and grounds were used for the 2017-8 filming of the documentary/reality programme Churchill's Secret Agents: The New Recruits.

== Gallery ==
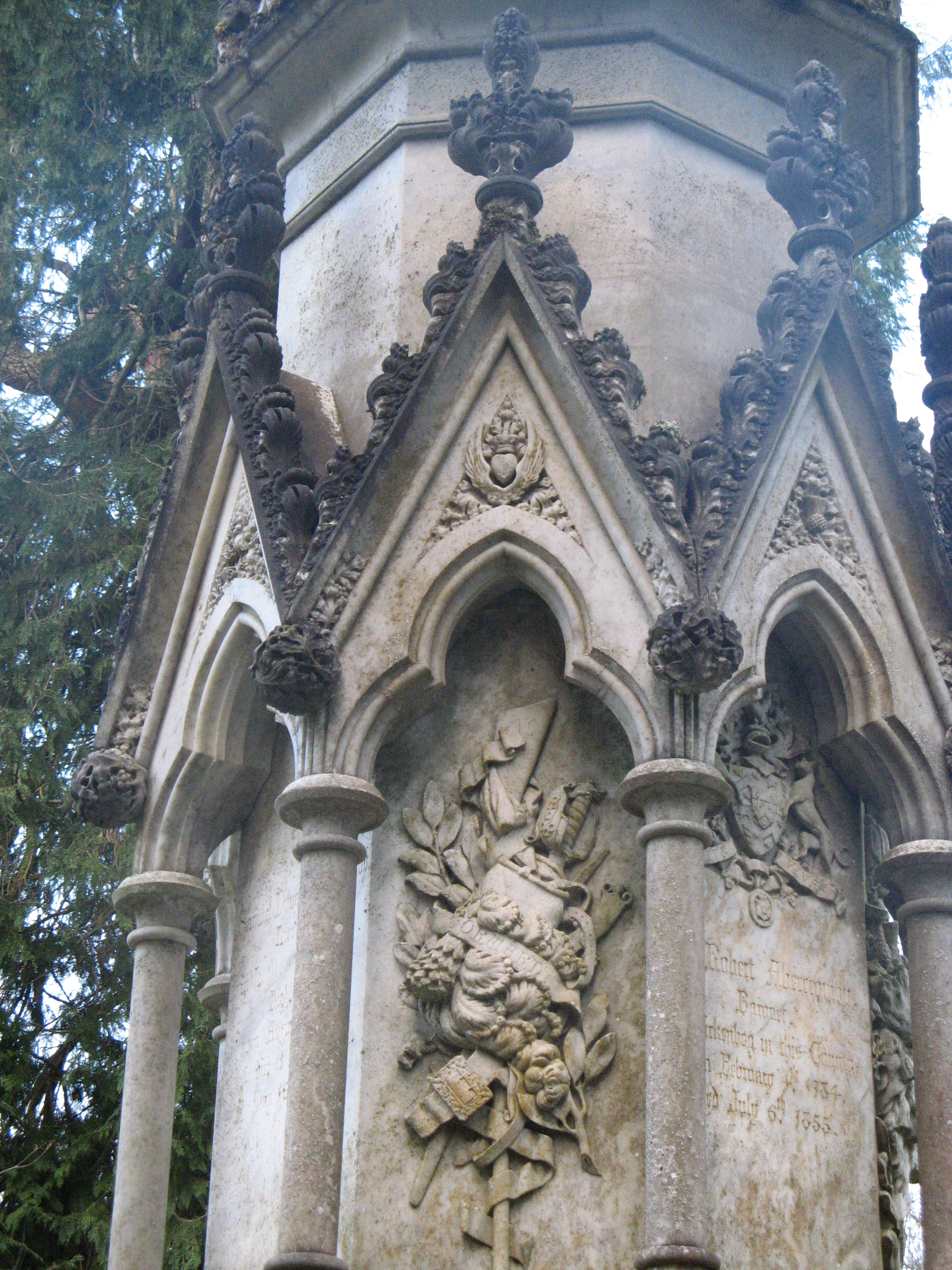
Detail on the Abercromby memorial

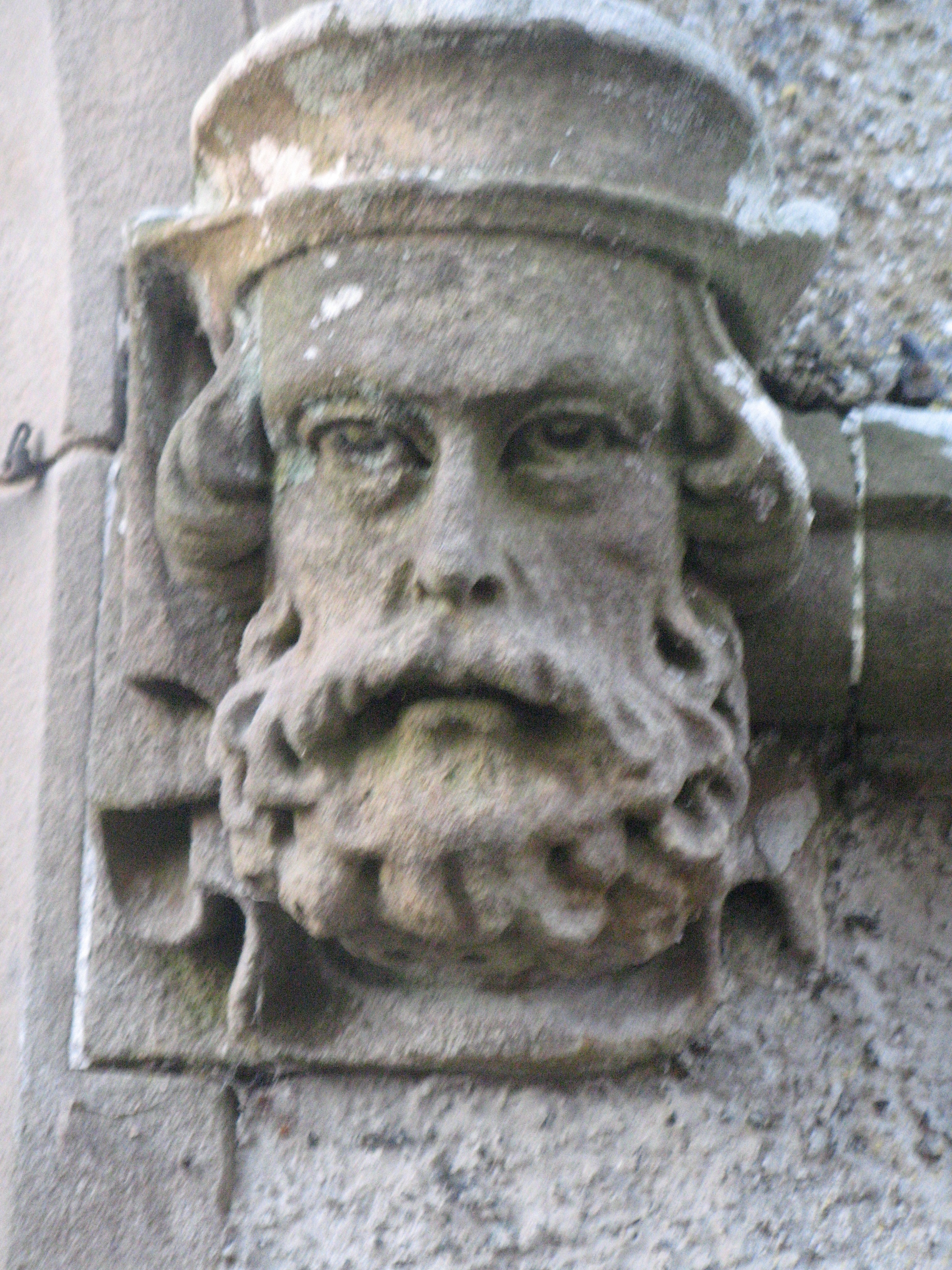
One of the stone decorations on the mansion house

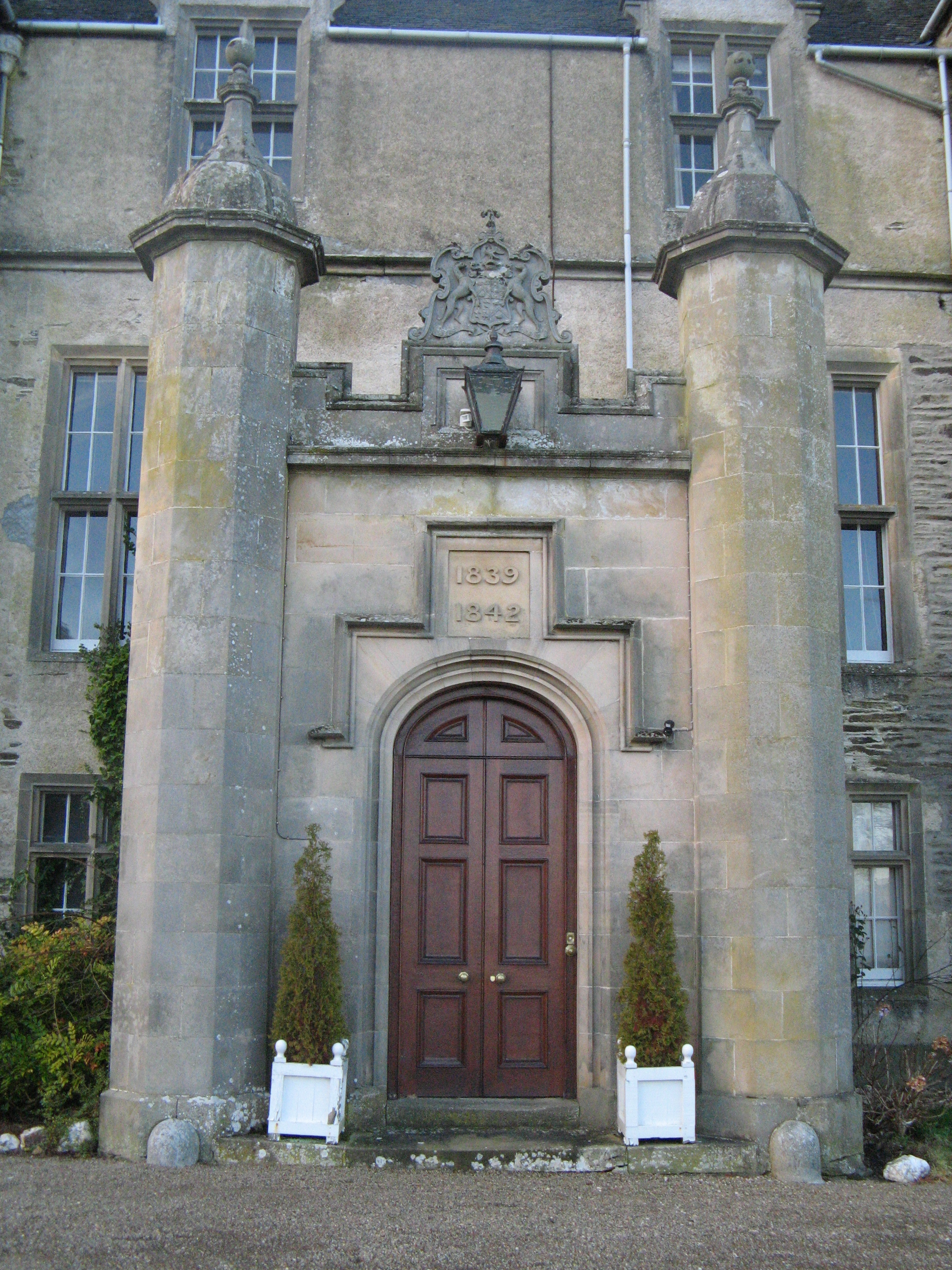
The main entrance to the mansion is a Tudor style porch

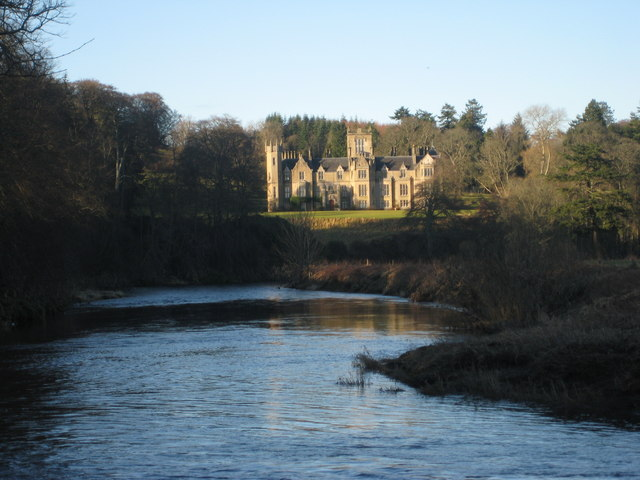
The River Deveron runs through the estate

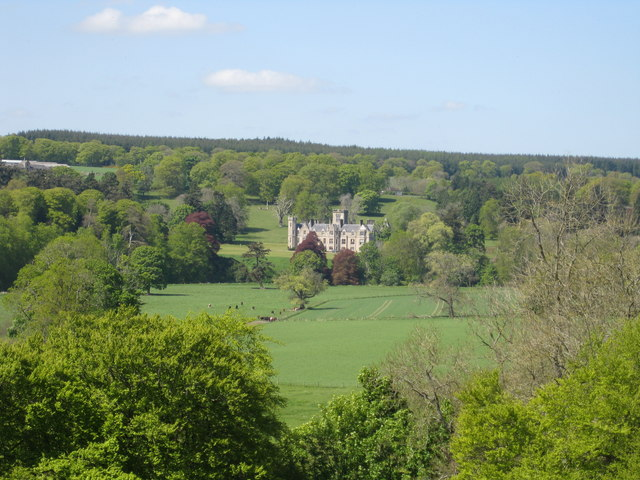
Forglen House, seen from the distance

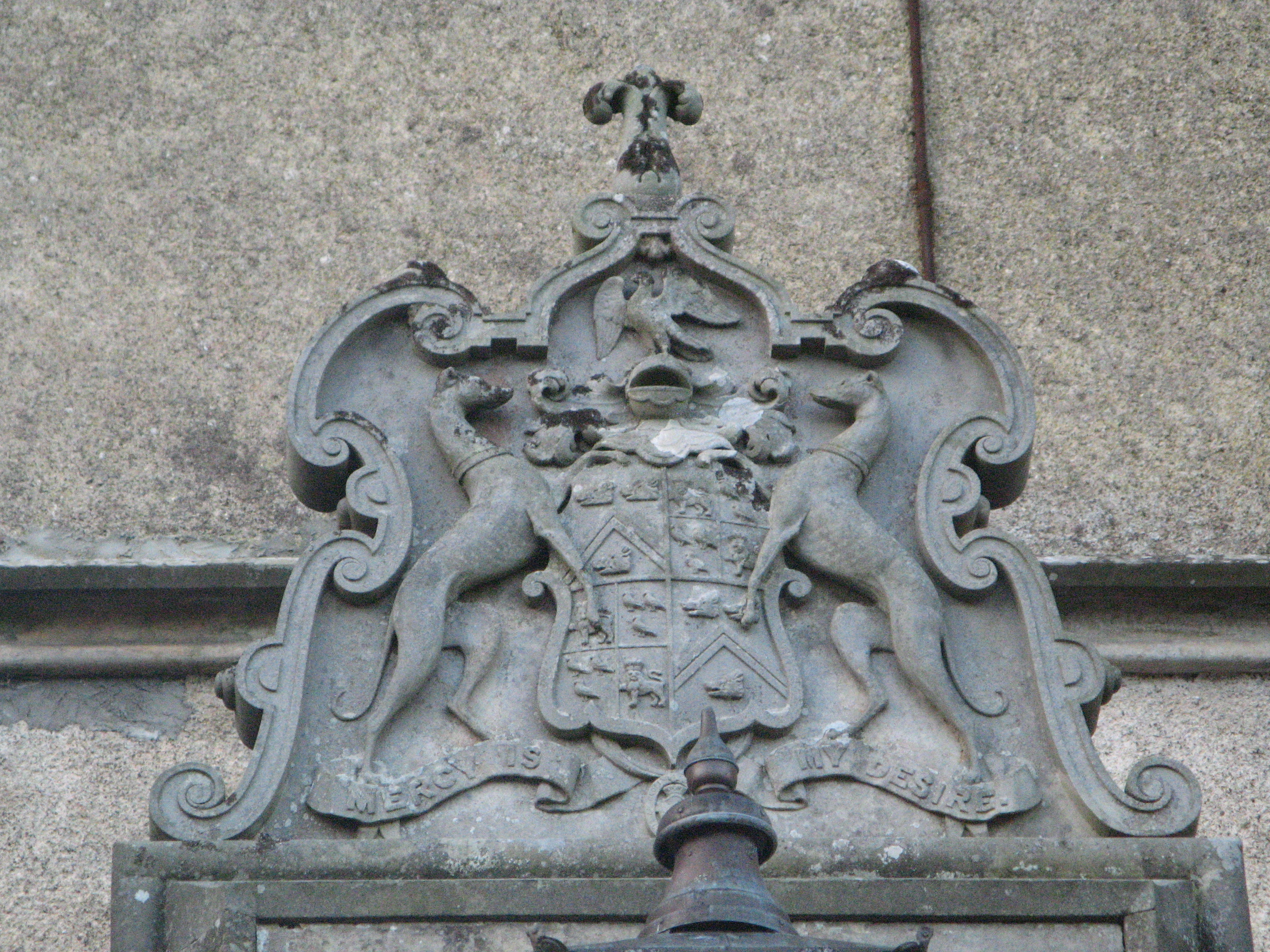
Abercromby coat of arms inset above the main entrance

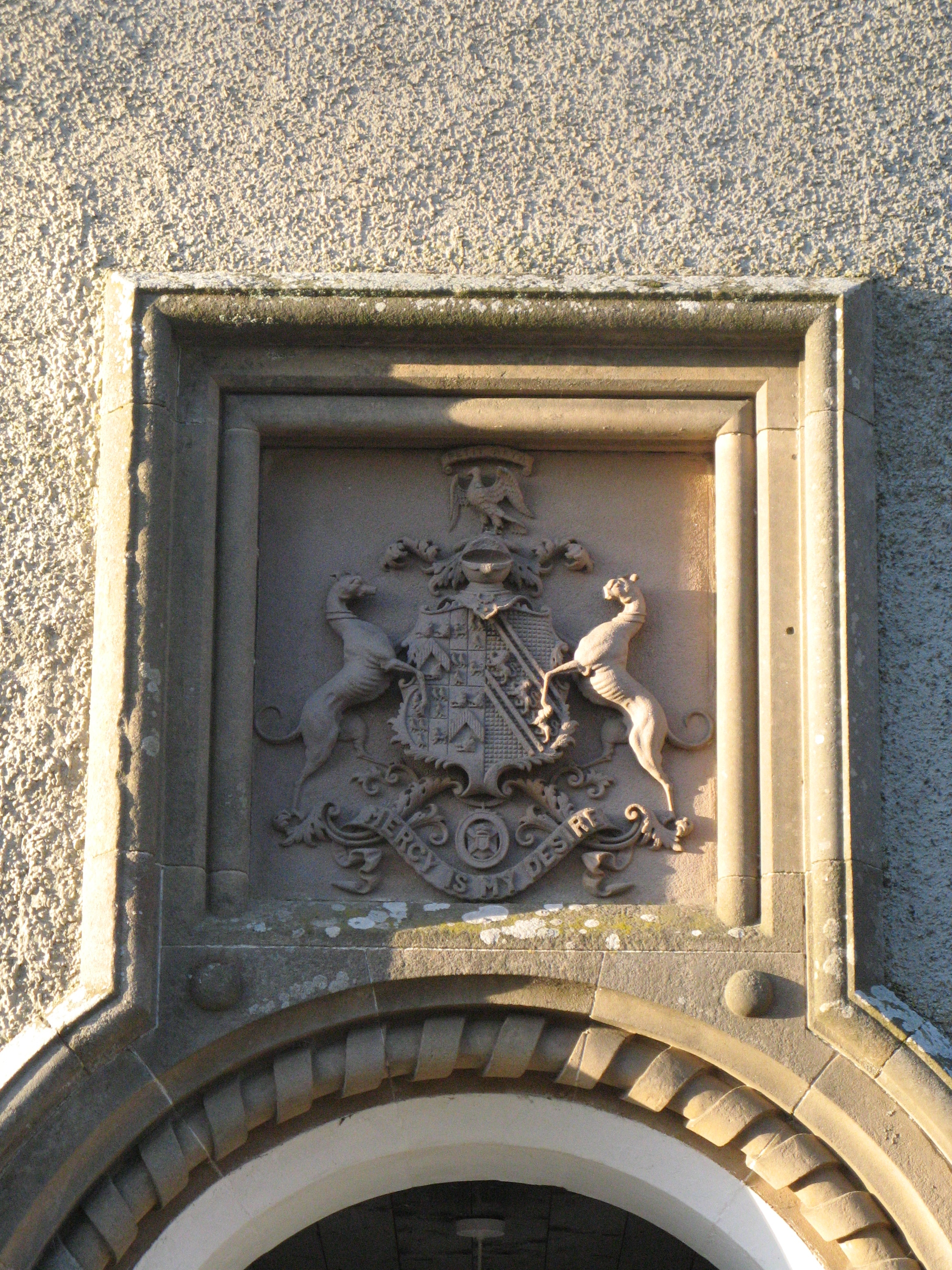
The Abercromby coat of arms is also inset above the doorway of the lodge house

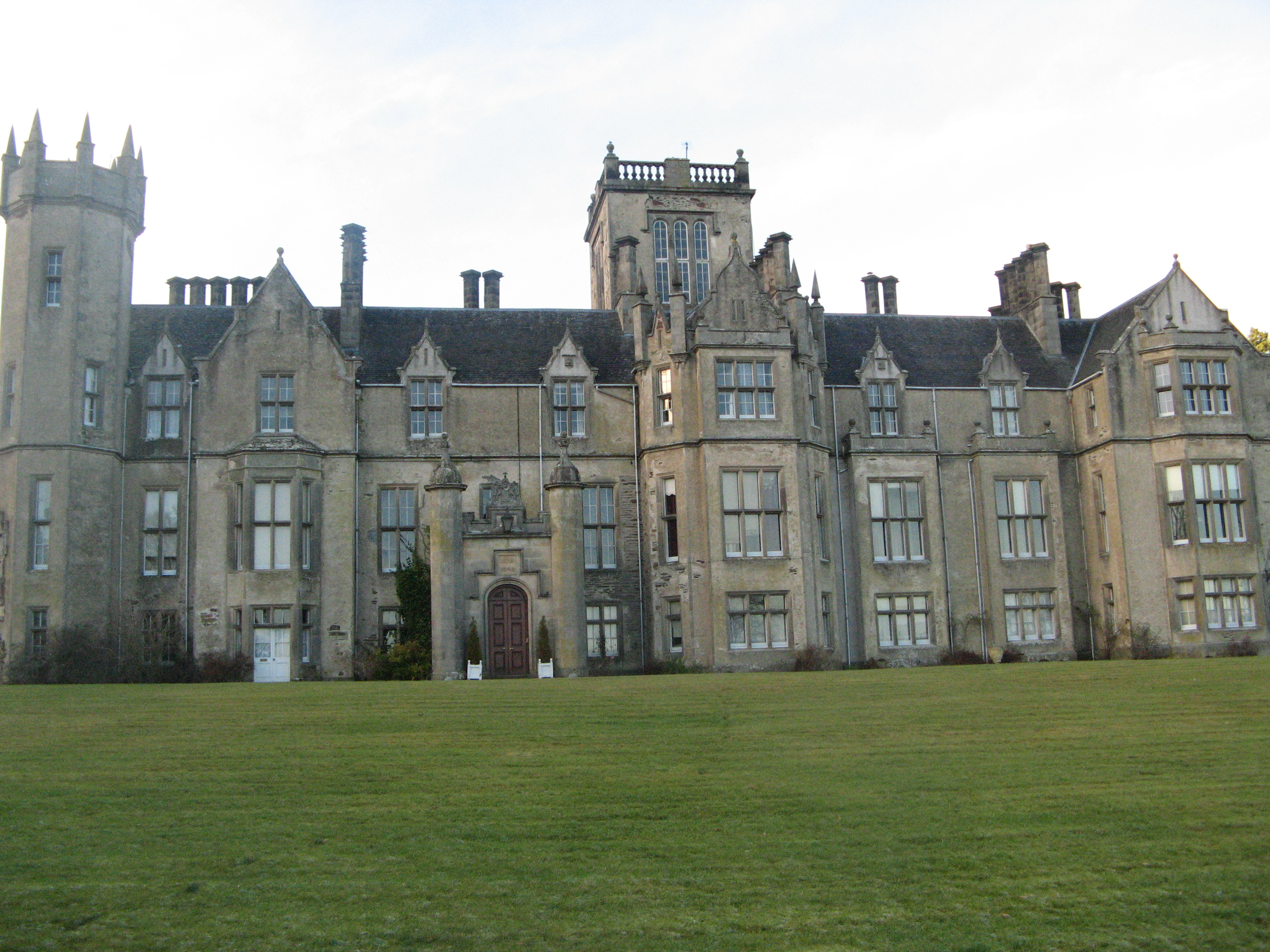
The front of the mansion

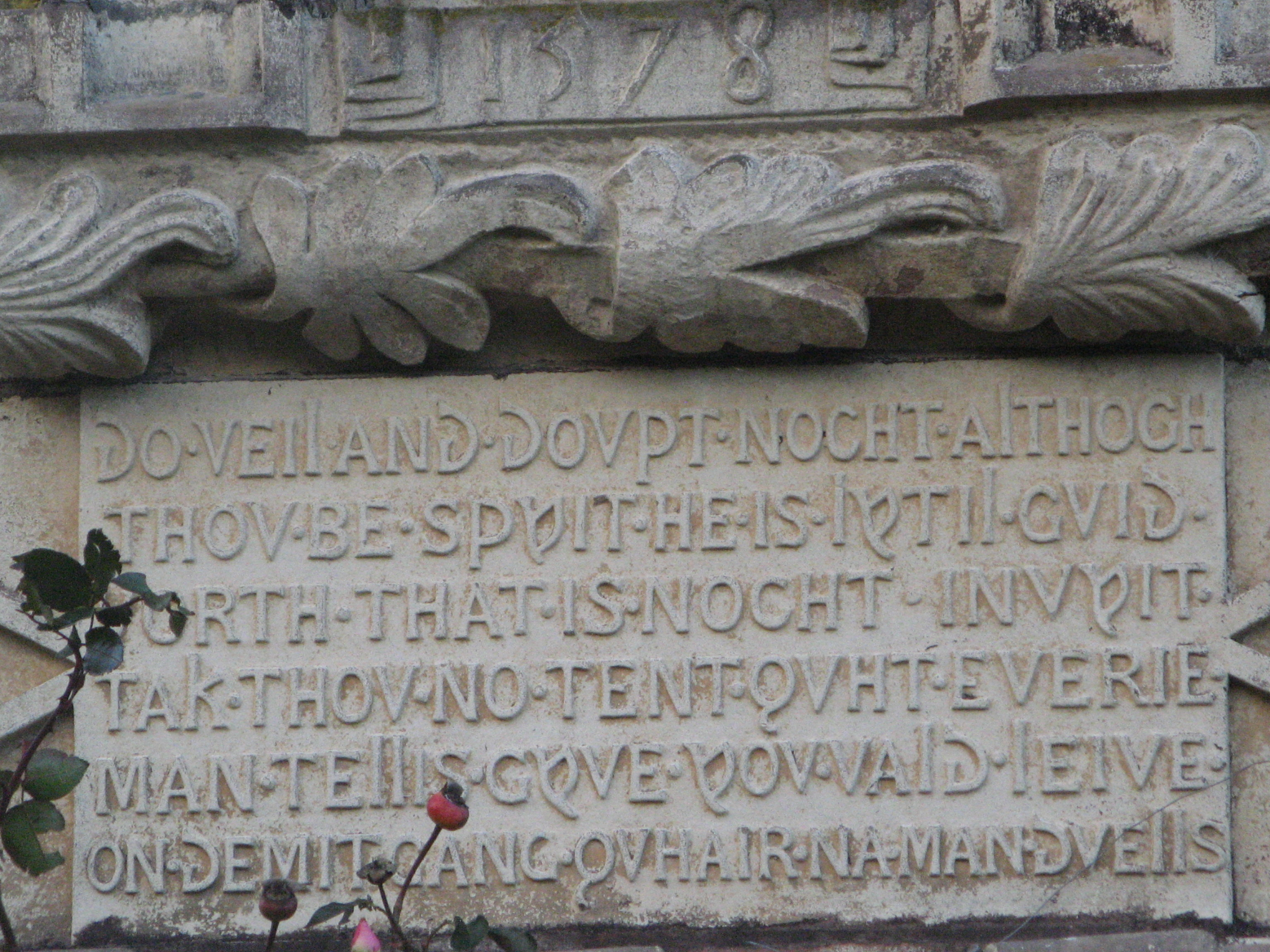
Inscription plaque below coats of arms set into one of the towers

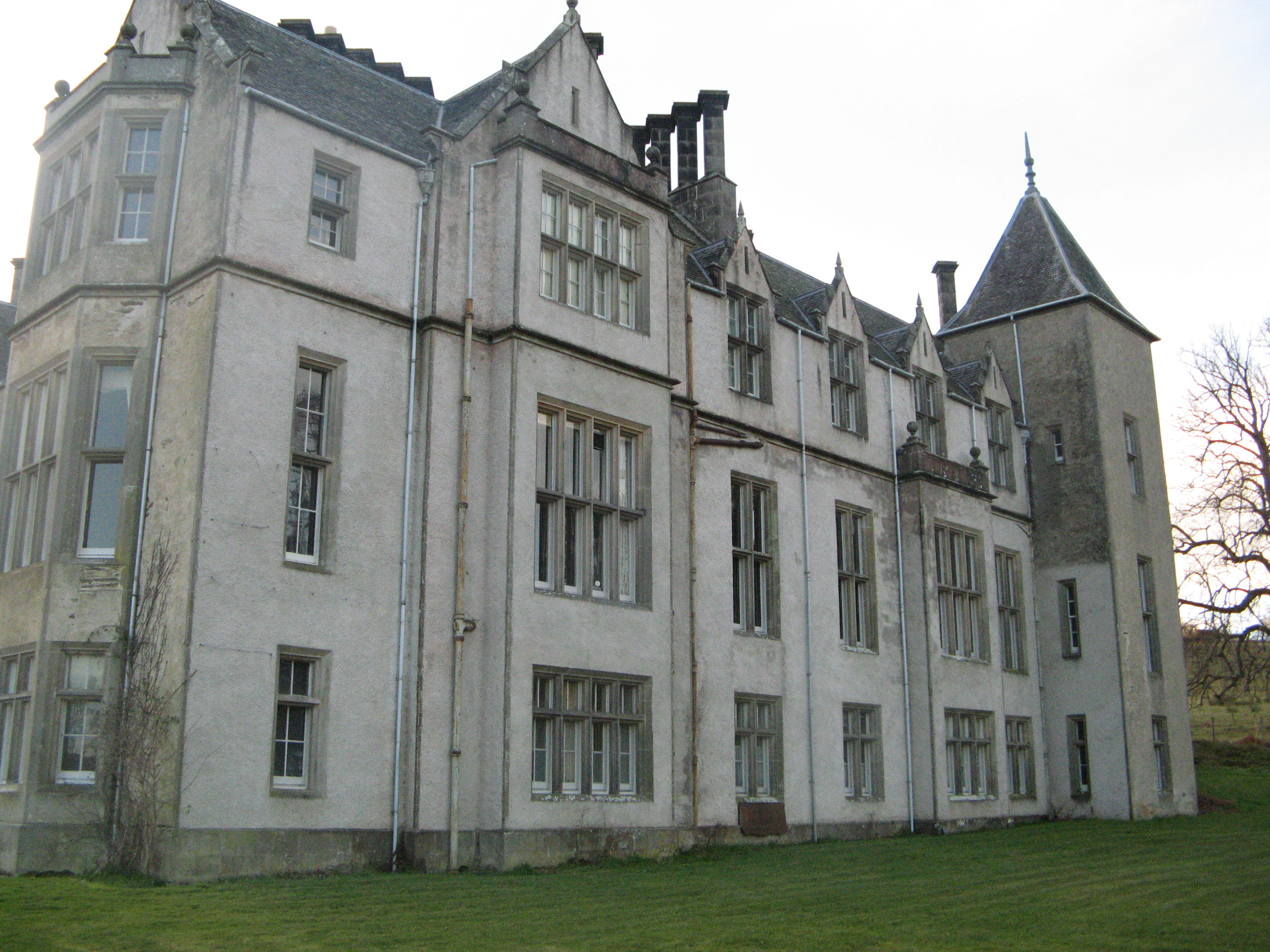
The north-east facing side of the mansion has a more reserved architectural style
