= Sir George Abercromby, 8th Baronet =

Scottish baronet and landowner (1886–1964)

Abercromby baronets of Birkenbog
- Motto: Above the crest: Petit alta (He seeks the heights) and below the shield: Mercie is my desire
- Arms: Quarterly, 1st and 4th, Argent a Chevron Gules between three Boars' Heads erased Azure langued of the second; 2nd and 3rd grand-quarters: 1st and 4th, Argent a Lion passant guardant Gules crowned with an Imperial Crown proper; 2nd and 3rd, Argent three Popinjays Vert beaked and membered Gules
- Crest: A Falcon rising belled proper
- Supporters: On either side a Greyhound Argent collared Gules

Sir George William Abercromby of Birkenbog, 8th Baronet DSO (18 March 1886 – 9 September 1964) was a Scottish baronet and landowner, who served as Lord Lieutenant of Banffshire between 1946 and 1964.

== Background ==
The Abercromby baronets descend from Humphrey Abercromby of Pitmedden (died circa 1457) and the title was created in the Baronetage of Nova Scotia on 20 February 1636. Abercromby was born in 1886, the elder son of Sir Robert Abercromby, 7th Baronet and his wife Florence, daughter of Eyre Coote. His father died in 1895 at which time he succeeded to the baronetcy, aged only nine. His mother subsequently married in 1899, Francis Baring, 2nd Earl of Northbrook. Abercromby was educated at Eton College. His extensive estate was situated principally around the town of Turriff with the family seat being Forglen House, a property which had been inherited by the Abercromby family from William Ogilvy, 8th Lord Banff.

== Career ==
Abercromby was commissioned as 2nd lieutenant into the Scots Guards in 1906. Three years later, he was promoted to lieutenant in the 6th Battalion Gordon Highlanders and afterwards served as aide-de-camp to the Sir Neville Lyttelton in his capacity as Commander-in-Chief of Ireland. He became captain in 1914 and was later advanced to lieutenant-colonel and brevet-colonel commanding the 6th Battalion of his regiment. Abercromby saw service in the First World War and was mentioned in despatches. In 1917, he was appointed a Companion of the Distinguished Service Order. After his retirement he was appointed honorary colonel of his former Battalion in 1931.

Abercromby was nominated Deputy Lieutenant for Banffshire in 1928 and subsequently was appointed Vice Lieutenant. He sat in the Banff County Council for many years and was sometime its convener. In 1946, he succeeded James Archibald as Lord Lieutenant and held this post a few months before his death.

== Family ==
Abercromby married on 17 January 1935, Eleanor, only daughter of Sir Arthur Robert Anderson. The couple had no children and when Abercromby died in 1964, he was succeeded as baronet by his younger brother Robert.

== Notes ==
Honorary titles
Preceded by James Archibald	Lord Lieutenant of Banffshire; 1946–1964	Succeeded by Thomas Robert Gordon-Duff
Baronetage of Nova Scotia
Preceded by Robert John Abercromby	Baronet (of Birkenbog); 1895–1964	Succeeded by Robert Alexander Abercromby
