= Sir Robert John Abercromby, 7th Baronet =

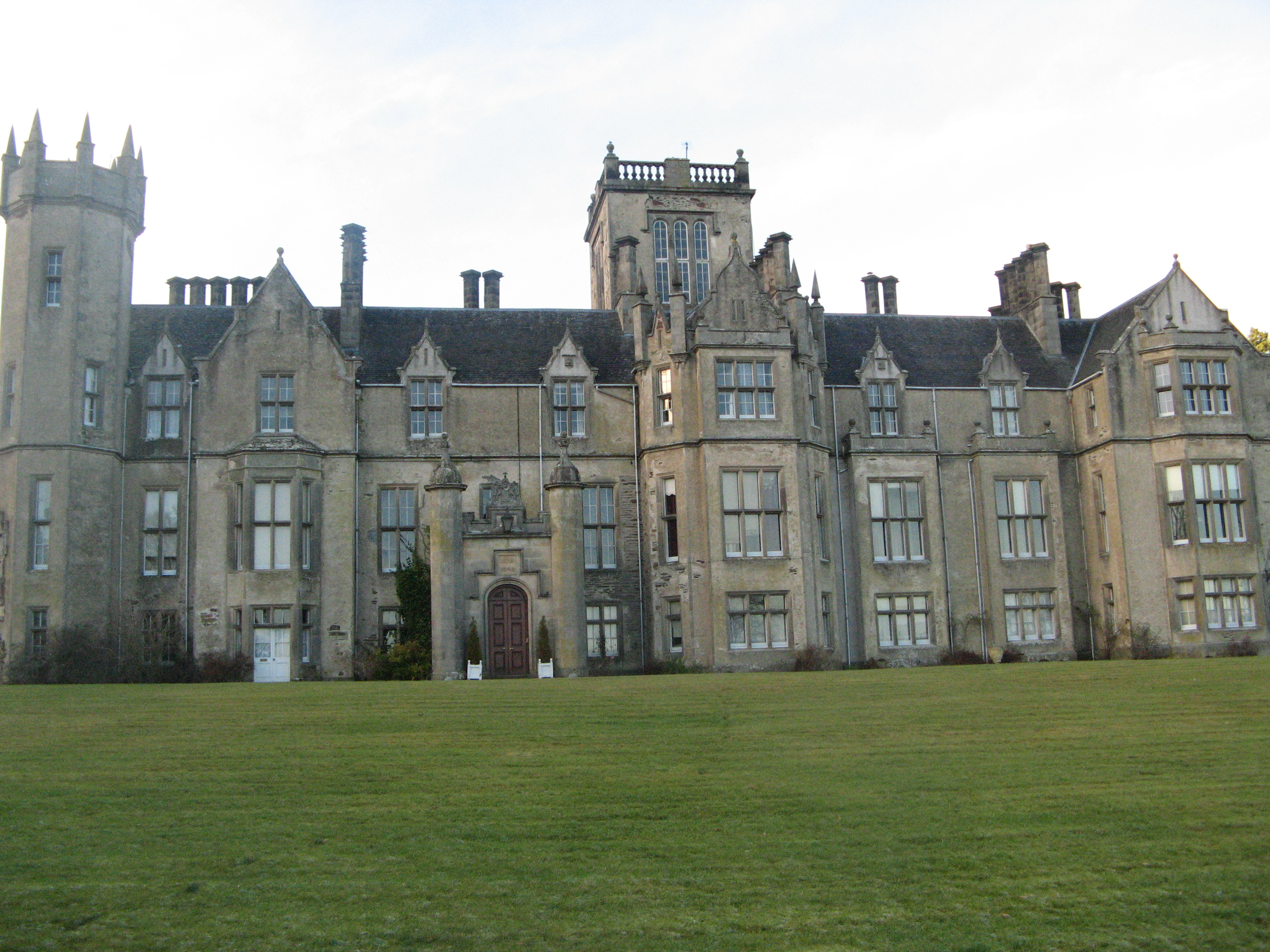
Forglen House, the main ancestral seat of the Abercromby family

Robert John Abercromby (14 June 1850 – 24 July 1895) was the seventh Scottish Abercromby baronet. He held the estates of Birkenbog and Forglen, as well as land in Ireland. He served as Vice-Lord-Lieutenant of Banffshire, and Justice of the Peace and Commissioner of Supply for both Aberdeenshire and Banffshire.

== Ancestry ==
Abercromby was the son of George Samuel Abercromby (1824–1872) and Agnes Georgina, the daughter of John Cavendish, 3rd Earl of Kilmaine. The couple had three other sons, George Cosmo, Cavendish Douglas and Douglas Charles, and two daughters.

== Life ==
Abercromby was born in London on 14 June 1850 but spent his formative years at Forglen House in Turriff, Aberdeenshire, after his father succeeded to the family estates in Scotland and Ireland in the year 1855. He was educated at Eton College. In November 1872 he inherited the estates from his father, becoming the 7th in the line of Abercromby baronets.

Forglen House was the main family seat and Abercromby continued programmes of improvement to the house and policies (Note: the definition of policies as used in Scots land terminology given in the OED is: "The enclosed (and often ornamental) grounds, park, or demesne land surrounding a large country house.") that had been initiated by his forebears. The Abercrombys also owned land in Ireland after the 5th Baronet bought most of the town of Fermoy from the estate of fellow Scotsman John Anderson after his death in 1820. The 7th baronet is recorded as the owner of 434 acres of land in County Cork during the 1870s and Fermoy House is listed as the family seat in Ireland. Inchdrewer Castle also formed part of his inheritance and MacGibbon and Ross list it in his ownership in 1887.

Abercromby served on several committees, including being convenor of the County Lunacy Board, chairman of the Parochial Board (when these became civil parishes he was unopposed as chairman of the new committee) and a member of the Banff County Road Board. He was appointed Deputy Lieutenant of Banffshire from 1874, then Vice-Lord-Lieutenant of Banffshire from 1892. From 1876 he was also Deputy Lieutenant of Aberdeenshire. He also undertook the roles of Justice of the Peace and Commissioner of Supply for both Banffshire and Aberdeenshire, although he was less active within the jurisdiction of the latter.

On 26 June 1883 Abercromby married Florence Anita Eyre Coote (23 December 1860 – 4 December 1946), the only daughter of Eyre Coote and the granddaughter of the British Army officer of the same name, with whom he had two sons and two daughters. The youngest child, Robert Alexander Abercromby, was born almost three weeks after Abercromby's death and later, after the death of his brother, became the 9th baronet.

== Death and legacy ==
Abercromby had been in poor health for several years before he died. He and his wife stayed in Ceylon during the winter of 1894 to avoid the extreme Scottish weather. His health appeared to have improved after they returned to the UK but he was taken ill in July. Despite a successful stomach operation, he died on 24 July 1895. Abercromby is buried in the mausoleum within the policies of Forglen House.

The estate passed to his eldest son, George William Abercromby (born 18 March 1886), who at the time was nine years old.

Baronetage of Nova Scotia
Preceded by George Samuel Abercromby	Baronet (of Birkenbog); 1872–1895	Succeeded by George Abercromby
