= Sir James Abercromby, 2nd Baronet =

Scottish baronet and politician

Sir James Abercromby of Birkenbog, 2nd Baronet (c. 1670 – 20 September 1734) was a Scottish baronet and politician.

He was the oldest son of Sir Alexander Abercromby, 1st Baronet and his third wife Elizabeth Baird, daughter of Sir James Baird. Abercromby succeeded his father as baronet in 1684. He entered the Parliament of Scotland in 1693, sitting as a Member of Parliament (MP) for Banffshire until 1702.

Abercromby had a library of some importance, and books with his engraved bookplate can still be found in libraries today.

Abercromby married Mary Gordon, daughter of Arthur Gordon. They had fifteen children, ten sons and five daughters. Abercromby was succeeded in the baronetcy by his third and oldest surviving son Robert.

Baronetage of Nova Scotia
Preceded by Alexander Abercromby	Baronet (of Birkenbog); 1684–1734	Succeeded by Robert Abercromby
