= George Ogilvy, 3rd Lord Banff =

Scottish nobleman

George Ogilvy, recorded as baptised in the Aberdeen sasines, xiv 500, on 9 September 1649, was the third Lord Banff. He inherited the lands of Inchdrewer and Montbray on the death of his father in 1668. Formerly a staunch Roman Catholic, he renounced his faith and became a Protestant in 1705, which allowed him to resume his seat in the Scottish Parliament in 1706. On the final sitting of the parliament, he voted in support of the Acts of Union 1707 and received a nominal payment as his share of the compensation fund. He was murdered and his body burned in a fire at Inchdrewer Castle in 1713.

== Ancestry ==
Ogilvy was the eldest son of George Ogilvy, 2nd Lord Banff and his second wife, Agnes, the daughter of Sir Alexander Falconer, 1st Lord Falconer of Halkerton. The baptismal records of the Aberdeen sasines (xiv 500) show he was baptised in September 1649. He was the eldest of the couple's ten children, his younger brother was Sir Alexander Ogilvy, 1st Baronet.

Towards the end of September 1669, Ogilvy married Lady Jean Keith, a daughter of William Keith, 7th Earl Marischal. The couple had four children: a son, also named George (1670 – 12 January 1718) who went on to become the 4th Lord Banff; and three daughters, Anne, Isobel and the youngest Mary who was born in 1679.

== Life ==
When his father, George Ogilvy, 2nd Lord Banff died in September 1668, Ogilvy inherited the estates of Inchdrewer and Montbray and the title of 3rd Lord Banff. The main family seat was at Inchdrewer Castle, however he also spent time living in Ireland.

Ogilvy was a Roman Catholic but in 1705 he renounced his faith. Embracing protestantism, he endorsed his change of allegiance by swearing an oath and was re-admitted to the Scottish Parliament. He sat in Parliament on 3 October 1706, the final session of the Scottish Parliament. He supported every aspect of the Acts of Union 1707 receiving £11 2s as a share of the £20,000 divided between the noblemen who voted in favour of the union. Addressing the Edinburgh Philosophical Institution in 1871, the Earl of Rosebery referred to Ogilvy as having "sold his country and religion for a 10/- [ten shilling] note". (Note: The shorthand /- was used to denote shillings.)

In May 1708, Ogilvy was accused of firing a loaded gun at a Baillie. (Note: No indication is given whether any further proceedings were taken in this matter.)

== Death ==
Ogilvy was murdered and his body consumed in a fire that destroyed Inchdrewer Castle in 1713.

His death was described in the new Statistical Accounts of Scotland of 1834–45:

It is said that he had gone for some time to Ireland, engaged probably in some of the intrigues then carrying on in behalf of the Pretender; and it was suspected that the persons in whose charge he had left the castle, having pillaged some of his valuable property, murdered him immediately after his return, and set his apartment on fire for the sake of concealment. By some, it seems, the event was viewed as a judgment on his apostacy, and particularly with regard to some threats used by him of burning the Protestants.

After Ogilvy's death his son, George, inherited the estates and succeeded to the title becoming the 4th Lord Banff in 1713.

Peerage of Scotland
| Preceded by George Ogilvy | Lord Banff; 1668–1713 | Succeeded by George Ogilvy |
