= Walter Ogilvie of Dunlugas =

Walter Ogilvie of Dunlugas or Dunlugus (died 1558) was a Scottish courtier, landowner, and Provost of Banff.

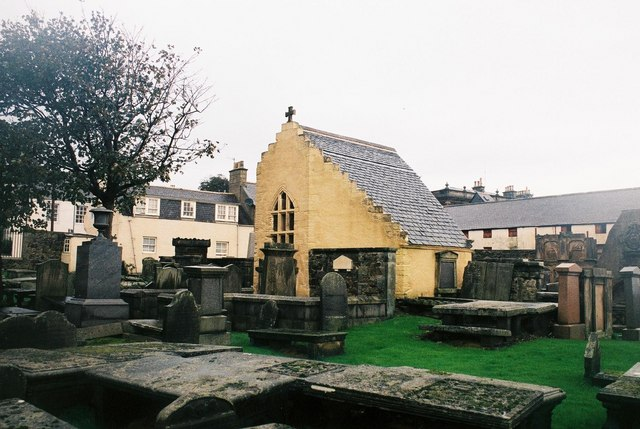
The Ogilvie burial aisle at Banff St Mary's Kirkyard

== Career ==
He was a son of Walter Ogilvie of Boyne (died 1504) and Margaret Edmondstone.

Ogilvie was described as a master of the stables and a steward (dapifer) in the household of James V in 1524.

In April 1538, James V gave Ogilvie a licence by privy seal letter permitting him to build a house in Banff, suitable to accommodate the king if he came north. It was to be built "palace-wise", perhaps meaning apartments on one or two storeys rather than in a large tower, but would have "battelling" and a defensible "barmkin" enclosure.

In 1543, Ogilvie signed the "Secret Bond", a protest against the policies of Regent Arran which led to Mary, Queen of Scots moving from Linlithgow Palace to Stirling Castle. Later in the year, he made a band of friendship with a kinsman James Ogilvie of Cardell.

His residence at Banff was Inchdrewer Castle. Walter Ogilvie died on 29 November 1558. His son George erected a monument at Banff.

== Library ==
One book that belonged to Walter Ogilvie survives in the library of the Cambridge University Library. Printed in 1474, the volume includes the Liber Alexandri Magni, the Gesta Romanorum, and the Consalatio Peccatorum. It was presented to the Blackfriars of Dundee by Henry Barry, rector of Collace. The Ogilvie inscription is in Latin and Scots:

This Buik pertenis to ane nobill man, Sir Walter Ogilvie of Dunlugus, knycht,
and now to his sone, George Ogilvy

Iste liber pertinet ad dominem Galterum Ogilvy de Dunlugus, Milite,
Cum gaudio absque dolore,
he that stelis this buik from me,
god gif he be hangit one ane tre,
Amen for me, Amen for the,
Amen for all good company.

The Friaries in Dundee were sacked in September 1543, a possible occasion for the book to come into the hands of Ogilvie.

== Family ==
Before 1539, Walter Ogilvie married Alison Home, co-heiress of Cuthbert Home of Fast Castle. Their children included:

- George Ogilvie of Dunlugus (died 1621), who married Beatrix Seton, a daughter of George Seton, 6th Lord Seton.
- Walter Ogilvie, who married Helen Stewart, daughter of Lord Innermeath
- Magdalen Ogilvie, who married Alexander Fraser of Philorth.
