= Sir Robert Abercromby, 5th Baronet =

British politician (1784–1855)

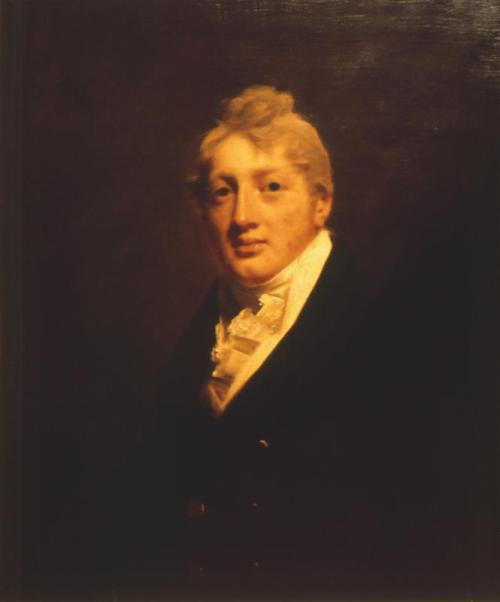
Portrait by Henry Raeburn, 1816

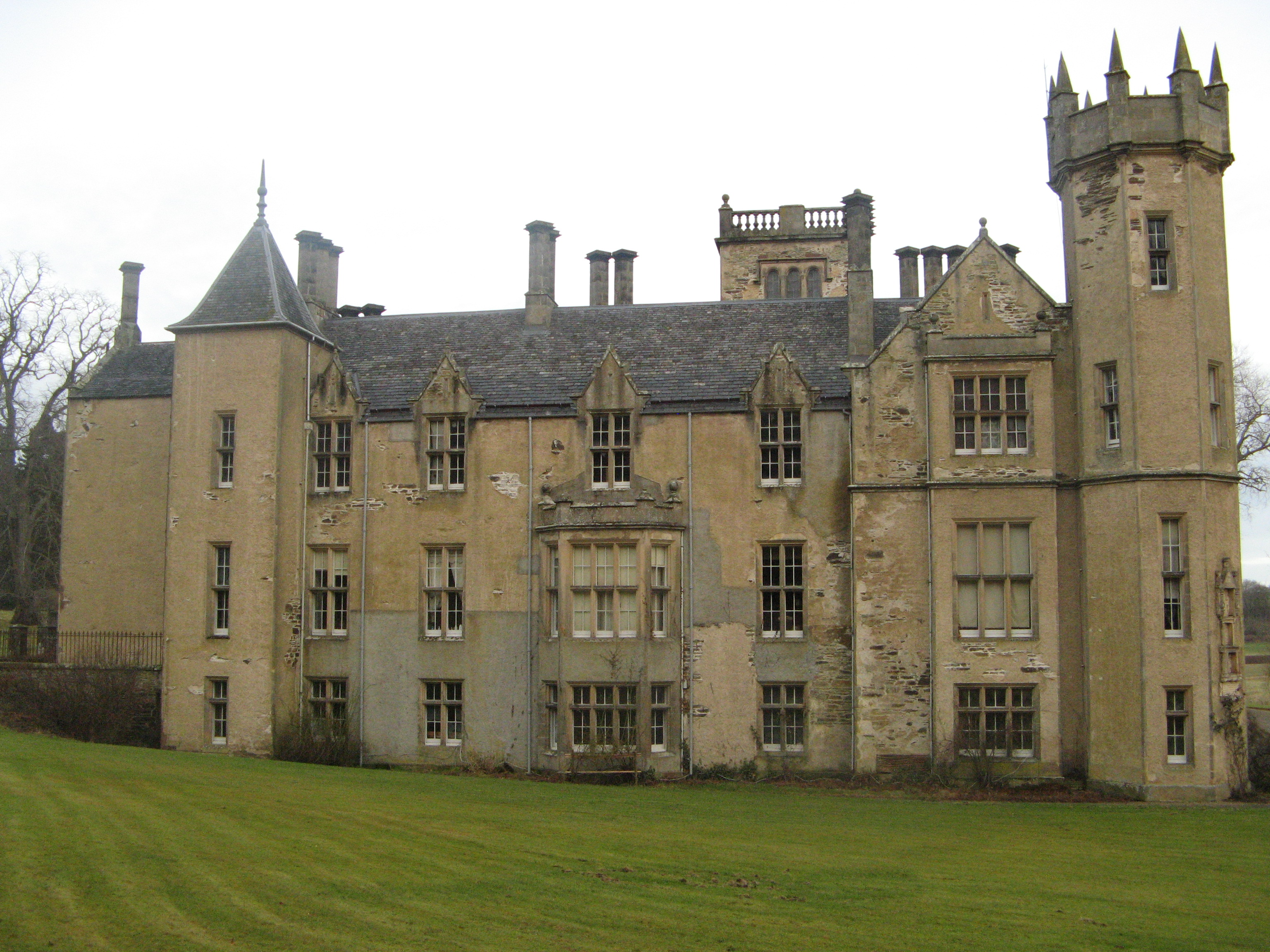
Forglen House

Sir Robert Abercromby, 5th Baronet of Birkenbog and Forglen, FRSE, DL (4 February 1784 – 6 July 1855) was a Scottish politician and landowner.

== Life ==
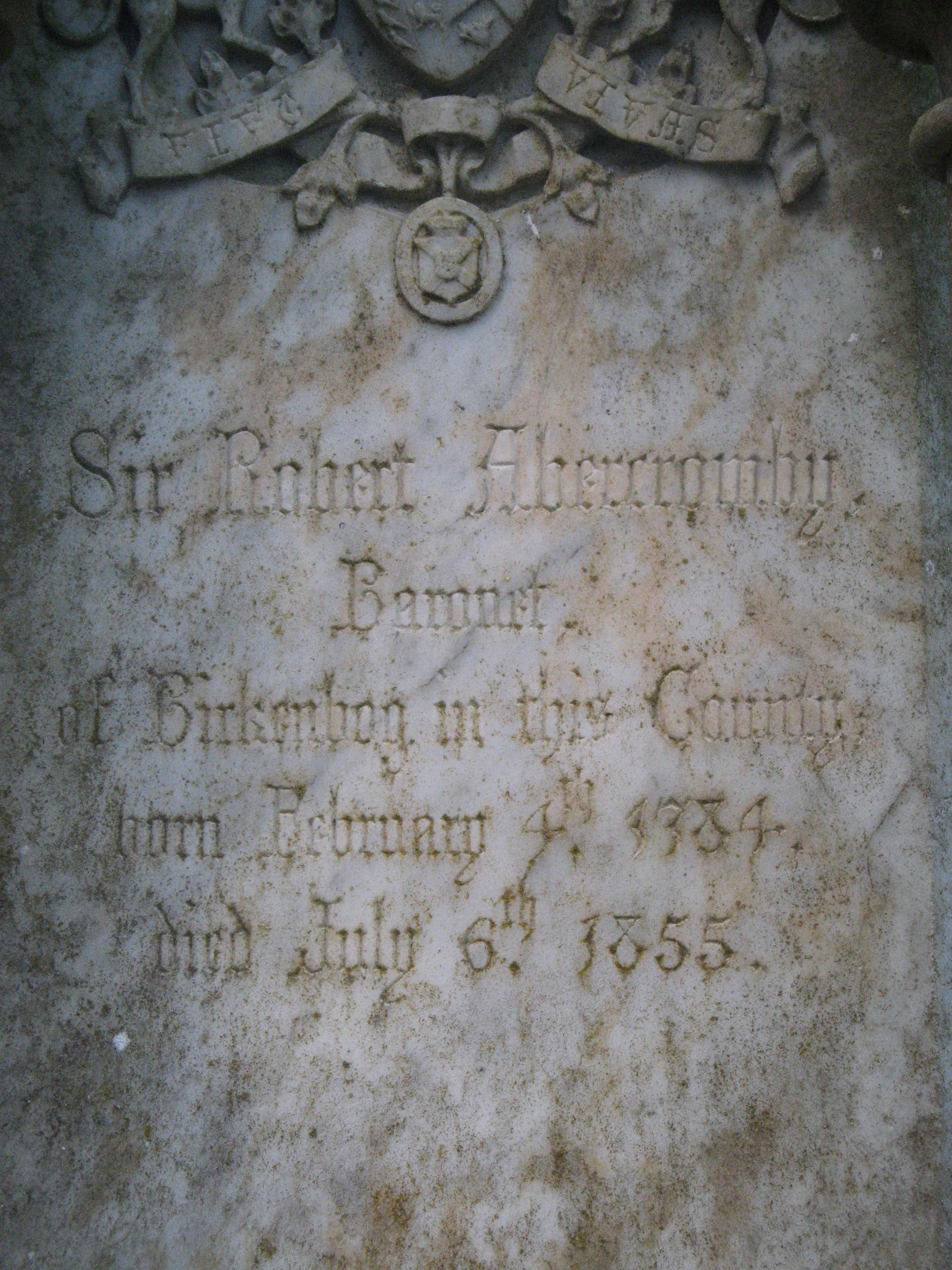
Detail of inscription on memorial for Robert Abercromby (Forglen House)

He was the son of Sir George Abercromby, 4th Baronet, and Jane Ogilvy, the daughter of Alexander Ogilvy, 7th Lord Banff. He succeeded to the titles on the death of his father in 1831. Among the properties he inherited were the main family seat, which was Forglen House in Turriff, Aberdeenshire.

From 1812 to 1818 he was the Member of Parliament for Banffshire. During the first quarter of the 19th century, Abercromby purchased most of the town and lands of Fermoy in Ireland from fellow Scotsman John Anderson. His grandson, Sir Robert John Abercromby, 7th Baronet is recorded as the owner of 434 acres of land in County Cork during the 1870s.

In 1822 he was elected a Fellow of the Royal Society of Edinburgh his proposer being David Brewster. He was a Deputy lieutenant for Banffshire and Kirkcudbrightshire.

In 1839 he commissioned Aberdeen architect John Smith to totally remodel Forglen House.

His town residence was at 18 Coates Crescent in Edinburgh's West End.

He died at Forglen on 6 July 1855.

== Family ==
On 22 October 1816 he married Elizabeth Stephenson Douglas (1795-1863), only daughter of Samuel Douglas of Netherlaw, Kirkcudbrightshire. They had 15 children of which the first 7 were daughters. The eighth child, George Samuel Abercromby (22 May 1824 – 14 November 1872) became 6th baronet on his father's death.

In 1839, a daughter, Georgina Charlotte, died aged only 16 (she is buried in St Johns churchyard in Edinburgh).

In 1852, a daughter, Roberta Henrietta Abercromby, married Sir Edwin Hare Dashwood, 7th Baronet.

In 1853, a daughter, Constance Helena Abercromby, married Lt.-Col. Hon. James Ogilvy-Grant (later 9th Earl of Seafield), MP for Elginshire and Nairnshire.

In 1862, a daughter, Frances Emily Abercromby, married William Forbes-Sempill, 17th Lord Sempill.

== Artistic recognition ==
He was portrayed by Sir Henry Raeburn.

== See also ==
- Abercromby baronets

Parliament of the United Kingdom
Preceded by Sir William Grant	Member of Parliament for Banffshire; 1812–1818	Succeeded by James Duff
Baronetage of Nova Scotia
Preceded by George Abercromby	Baronet (of Birkenbog); 1831–1855	Succeeded by George Samuel Abercromby
