= Lord Banff =

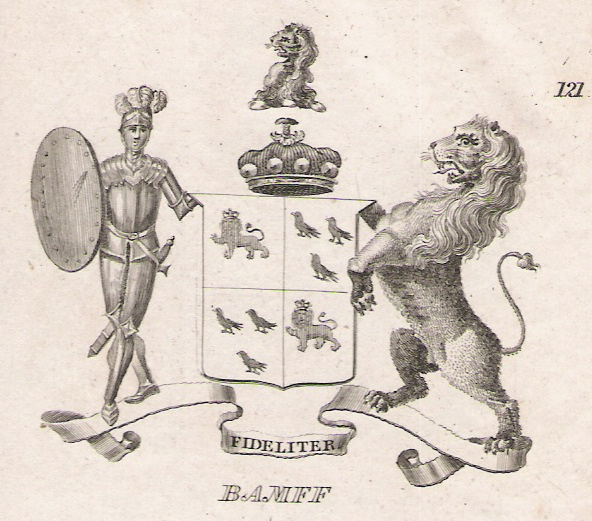
Arms of the Lords of Banff

Lord Banff is an extinct or dormant title in the Peerage of Scotland. It was created on 31 August 1642 for Sir George Ogilvy, 1st Baronet. He had already been created a Baronet, of Forglen in the County of Banff, in the baronetage of Nova Scotia on 30 July 1627. He was succeeded by his son, the second Lord. He was a cavalier and member of the Parliament of Scotland. On his death the title passed to his elder son, the third Lord. He was a supporter of the Union between England and Scotland. He was succeeded by his son, the fourth Lord. Two of his sons, the fifth and sixth Lords, succeeded in the title. The latter was a captain in the Royal Navy. He was unmarried and on his early death in 1746 the line of the third Lord failed. The late Lord Banff was succeeded by his second cousin Sir Alexander Ogilvy, 2nd Baronet, who became the seventh Lord. He was the grandson of the Hon. Alexander Ogilvy, younger son of the second Lord, who had been created a baronet, of Forglen in the County of Banff, in the Baronetage of Nova Scotia in 1701. On the death of his unmarried eldest surviving son, the eighth Lord, in 1803, the lordship and two baronetcies became either extinct or dormant. The Forglen estate passed to the late Lord Banff's sister the Hon. Jane, wife of Sir George Abercromby, 4th Baronet (see Abercromby baronets).

== Lords Banff (1642) ==
- George Ogilvy, 1st Lord Banff (d. 1663)
- George Ogilvy, 2nd Lord Banff (d. 1668)
- George Ogilvy, 3rd Lord Banff (1649–1713)
- George Ogilvy, 4th Lord Banff (1670–1718)
- John George Ogilvy, 5th Lord Banff (1717–1738)
- Alexander Ogilvy, 6th Lord Banff (1718–1746)
- Alexander Ogilvy, 7th Lord Banff (d. 1771)
- William Ogilvy, 8th Lord Banff (d. 1803)

== Ogilvy baronets, of Forglen (1701) ==
- Sir Alexander Ogilvy, 1st Baronet (d. 1727)
- Sir Alexander Ogilvy, 2nd Baronet (d. 1771) (succeeded as Lord Banff in 1746)

see above for further succession
