= Sir Alexander Abercromby, 1st Baronet =

Scottish politician

Sir Alexander Abercromby of Birkenbog, 1st Baronet (c. 1603 – December 1684) was a Scottish politician.

He was the oldest son of Alexander Abercromby of Birkenbog and his wife Elizabeth Bethune, daughter of David Bethune. On 20 February 1636, he was created a Baronet, of Birkenbog, in the County of Banff. Abercromby entered the Parliament of Scotland in 1640, sitting for Banffshire until the following year. He represented the constituency also in 1643 and after a break of three years, he was returned for it in 1646, a seat he held for the next two years. In 1661, he was again successful for Banffshire until 1663. Abercromby was a Covenanter and in 1645 took part at the Battle of Auldearn under command of John Hurry.

He married firstly Jane Urquhart, daughter of Sir Thomas Urquhart, and had by her a son and three daughters. After her death, Abercromby remarried Jane Sutherland. On 22 August 1668 he married thirdly Elizabeth Baird, daughter of Sir James Baird. Abercromby had another daughter by his second wife and three sons and a daughter by his third wife. He was succeeded in the baronetcy by his second and oldest surviving son James. His third son Alexander was also a Member of Parliament and ancestor of the Barons Abercromby.

Baronetage of Nova Scotia
New creation	Baronet (of Birkenbog); 1636–1684	Succeeded by James Abercromby
