= Rohmir =

Swiss luxury fashion company

- Rohmir logo depicting a female griffin, with feather in "M" (as introduced in 2007)
- Industry: Luxury Fashion
- Founded: 2007 (19 years ago)
- Founder: Olga Roh
- Products: Textiles, Apparel
- Website: www.rohmir.com

Rohmir is a Swiss luxury fashion company. Founded in Monaco in 2007, Rohmir produces and sells ready-to-wear clothing and fashion accessories for women and girls. Rohmir has shown its new collections at the London Fashion Week since 2012. Before that, Rohmir has cooperated with Cartier in 2010 and has shown its collection in the Victoria and Albert Museum's Raphael Hall in 2012.

In 2009, designer and creative director Olga Roh combined her practical experience in fashion, business and academics to set up her own garment factory in Hong Kong. Olga Roh studied for a master's degree of fashion at Istituto Marangoni in London, was mentored by Patrick Morgan, British artist and illustrator for Christian Dior and of the James Bond film series' "Spectre". Olga Roh holds a PhD from the University of Bern and is the official designer of Miss Switzerland, the Swiss national beauty pageant.

Rohmir operates under its own brand, as well as under Rohmiracle, a younger, more competitively priced diffusion line.

The company is now present in Europe and Asia, with its own flagship stores in Berlin, London, Zurich and Hong Kong.

== Inspirations and style ==
Rohmir's designs build on structured silhouettes and symmetrically silhouetted pieces, which enhance the body's femininity. Rohmir’s original collections were inspired by the daring clothing of the "années folles", the "Garçonne era of the Twenties and Thirtees", as well as Italian fashion. Some of the brand's goods are patented technical innovations. Rohmir is also known for its use of quality French tweed and lace, which has earned it the designation ''Elegant, glamorous and timeless French fashion".

== Ready-to-wear collections at the London Fashion Week ==
Since 2012, Rohmir has presented its newest collections at the bi-annual London Fashion Week. Rohmir's catwalks usually include surprise performances which suit the theme of the show, for example performances by members and associates of Rambert Dance Company and The Royal Ballet.

== Events ==
Each new collection has been premiered at the London Fashion Week since 2012, showcasing the "latest in avant-garde fashion" and its collections are covered by Vogue (magazine). Rohmir regularly holds exclusive events such as in The Peninsula Hong Kong or fashion shows in Monaco attended by Albert II, Prince of Monaco.

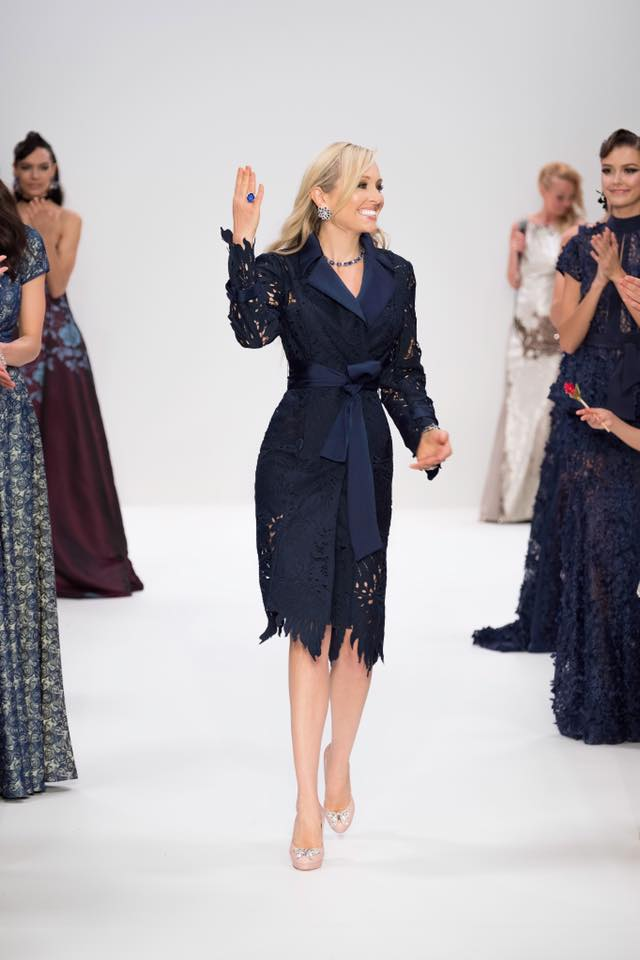
Rohmir Designer Olga Roh at her Fashion Show, around her are models dressed in Rohmir.

Olga Roh's daughter, Nicole Lemann, has often featured alongside her mother at events and TV programs aimed at promoting Rohmir. In October 2013, Olga and Nicole appeared on Fox TV's show "Meet the Russians" to promote Rohmir where Nicole was featured working at the now defunct Rohmir store in London.
