= Sir Alexander Ogilvy, 1st Baronet =

Scottish politician and judge

Sir Alexander Ogilvy, 1st Baronet (died 1727) was a Scottish politician and judge, lord of session under the title Lord Forglen.

== Life ==
He was the second son of George Ogilvy, 2nd Lord Banff, and Agnes Falconer, only daughter of Sir Alexander Falconer, 1st Lord Falconer of Halkerton.

Ogilvy was involved in a legal dispute with Sir Alexander Forbes of Tolquhoun. On 28 March 1685, he was sued by Forbes for the value of a silver cup, which Forbes alleged had been taken out of his house, On 23 April, he pursued Forbes for defamation, the result being that the council fined Forbes 20,000 merks, one half to the king's cashier. The king's half of the fine was subsequently remitted, but the council compelled Forbes to pay Ogilvy's half.

Ogilvy was created a baronet 29 June 1701, and sat in the Parliament of Scotland as the member for the burgh of Banff in 1701–02 and 1702–1707. His family home was Forglen House in the north but in Edinburgh, where the law courts are, he lived on Anchor Close, off the Royal Mile. The house had pleasant gardens on its north side edging onto the Nor' Loch, containing a pleasant summerhouse.

In the late 18th century, he was a member of the Crochallan Fencibles, a club which met at Dawney's Tavern on Anchor Close in Edinburgh.

In June 1703, he and Lord Belhaven were ordered into custody for having quarrelled in the parliament house in the presence of James Douglas, 2nd Duke of Queensberry, the Lord High Commissioner, and come to blows. On 30 June, it was moved that, as they had acknowledged their offence, they should be set at liberty; but Queensberry would not consent until the queen's pleasure was known. Ultimately, Lord Belhaven, for striking Ogilvy, was ordered to pay a fine of £5,000, and to ask pardon on his knees at the bar of the Lord High Commissioner; Queensberry dispensed with the kneeling.

On 26 March 1706, Ogilvy was appointed a lord of session, and he took his seat on 23 July following, with the title Lord Forglen. He was also named one of the commissioners for the union with England, which he strongly supported in the Scottish Parliament. He died 3 March 1727.

== Family ==
By his first wife, Mary, eldest daughter of Sir John Allardice of Allardice, Kincardineshire, Ogilvy had four sons, of whom the second, Alexander, succeeded him, and the others died without issue. By his second wife, Mary, daughter of David Leslie, 1st Lord Newark, and widow of Sir Francis Kinloch of Gilmerton, he left no issue.

== Notes ==
Attribution

This article incorporates text from a publication now in the public domain: Lee, Sidney, ed. (1895). "Ogilvy, Alexander (d.1727)". Dictionary of National Biography. Vol. 42. London: Smith, Elder & Co.

Parliament of Scotland
| Preceded by Walter Steuart | Burgh Commissioner for Banff; 1701–1707 | Succeeded by Parliament of Great Britain |
Baronetage of Nova Scotia
| New creation | Baronet (of Forglen); 1701–1727 | Succeeded by Alexander Ogilvy |
