= Banffshire (Parliament of Scotland constituency) =

Constituency of the Old Parliament of Scotland

- Former constituency for the Parliament of Scotland

Former constituency
- Abolished: 1707

Banffshire was a constituency represented in the Parliament of Scotland until 1707.

== Shire Commissioners ==
Election	First member	Second member
1593	Sir Walter Ogilvie	?
1621	George Ogilvie of Carnousie	?
1628	John Gordon (until 1633)	?
1639	Walter Urquhart	James Creichtoun
1640	Walter Urquhart	Sir Alexander Abercromby, 1st Bt
1641	James Creichtoun	?
1643	Sir Alexander Abercromby, 1st Bt	James Hay
1644	Walter Ogilvie	?
1646	Sir Alexander Abercromby, 1st Bt	?
1648	Sir Alexander Abercromby, 1st Bt	Lyon of Troupe
1661	Sir Alexander Abercromby, 1st Bt (until 1663)	-
1665	Sir James Baird, sheriff	-
1667	Sir Alexander Urquhart	-
1669	Sir Patrick Ogilvie (until 1674)	Sir James Baird
1672	Sir Patrick Ogilvie (until 1674)	?
1678	Sir Patrick Ogilvie	James Baird
1681 (until 1682)	Sir George Gordon	Sir Patrick Ogilvie
1685 (until 1686)	Sir George Gordon	Sir Patrick Ogilvie
1689	Alexander Duff	Sir Patrick Ogilvie
1693	Alexander Duff	Sir James Abercromby, 2nd Bt
1702	Alexander Duff	James Ogilvie
1706	Alexander Abercromby	James Ogilvie
