= George Ogilvy, 2nd Lord Banff =

Scottish politician and noble (d. 1668)

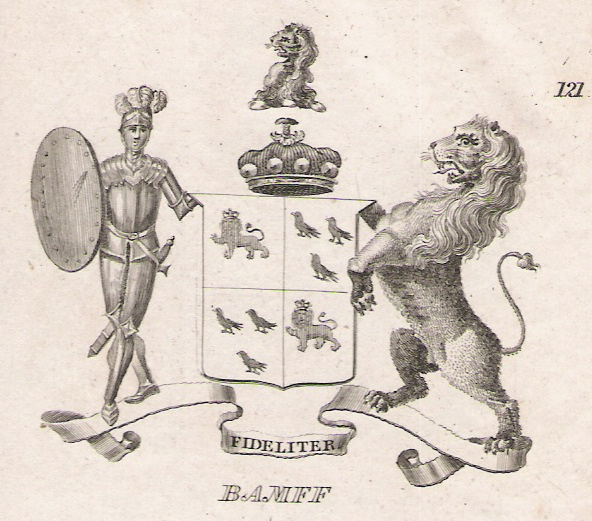
Arms of the Lords of Banff as shown in Brown's The Peerage of Scotland, 1834

George Ogilvy, 2nd Lord Banff (died March 1668) was member of the old Scottish Parliament, a feudal baron, and a Cavalier.

== Family ==
The son of Sir George Ogilvy, 1st Lord Banff, and 1st Baronet (1627), by his spouse Janet, daughter of William Sutherland, Lord Duffus. George, 2nd Lord Banff, was, on 29 October 1663, served heir to his father in the baronies of Inchdrewer and Mountbray, and on 24 September 1664, in lands in the parish of Gamrie.

== Career ==
Prior to succeeding his father in the honours, he represented Nairnshire in the Parliament held in Edinburgh on 4 June 1644. Like his father, "conspicuous at the King's side", he was an adherent of King Charles I and his son, Charles II. He fought for the latter at the battle of Worcester, from which he escaped.

== Marriage ==
The second Lord Banff married Agnes, daughter of Sir Alexander Falconer, 1st Lord Falconer of Halkerstoun. They had issue, ten children: eight daughters and two sons, of whom:

- George Ogilvy, 3rd Lord Banff (1649–1713) with issue.
- Sir Alexander Ogilvy, 1st Baronet of Forglen, M.P. (1651–1727) with issue.
- Agnes (b.1651) married Francis Gordon of Craig of Auchindoir.
- Helen (c1656 – 1714), who married Sir Robert Lauder of Beilmouth, Knt.
- Mary (b.c1657), married in 1680 John Forbes of Balflugg.

== Bibliography ==
- Balfour Paul, Sir James, The Scots Peerage, Edinburgh, 1905, volume 2, p. 14, under 'Banff'.

Peerage of Scotland
Preceded by George Ogilvy	Lord Banff; 1663–1668	Succeeded by George Ogilvy
