= George Ogilvy, 1st Lord Banff =

Scottish royalist army officer

George Ogilvy, 1st Lord Banff (c. 1587 – 11 August 1663) was a Scottish royalist army officer.

== Early life ==
He was eldest son of Sir Walter Ogilvy of Banff and Dunlugas, by Helen, daughter of Walter Urquhart of Cromarty. He had charters to himself and Margaret Irving, his wife, of the barony of Dunlugas, 9 March 1611, and another of the barony of Inschedour, 14 February 1628. On 30 July 1627 he was created a baronet of Nova Scotia. The family seat was Inchdrewer Castle.

On Michaelmas 1628, Ogilvy killed his cousin, James Ogilvy, but on making assythment he was not further proceeded against. In January 1630 he assisted Gordon of Rothiemay against James Crichton of Frendraught, when Gordon was slain, and after Crichton was forced, through the attacks of the Gordons, to go south to Edinburgh, Ogilvy in 1634 had his two sons quietly sent to him.

== Opponent of the Covenanters ==
Ogilvy supported Charles I in his contests with the Covenanters. In February 1639 he gave information to the Marquis of Huntly of a proposed rendezvous of the covenanters at Turriff; Huntly contented himself with displaying his forces. When Huntly came to terms with Montrose, Ogilvy remained a royalist, and he also prevailed on the Viscount Aboyne not to join his father in the south. Shortly afterwards, along with Aboyne, he took measures for his defence, and after Aboyne broke up his forces he still continued in arms.

Learning in May 1639 of another projected rendezvous of Covenanters at Turriff, Ogilvy proposed that an attack should be made on them, and, with Sir John Gordon of Haddo, he was appointed joint general of the forces. Early in the morning of 13 May the Covenanters were surprised, and completely defeated; Spalding, i. 185), the incident becoming known locally as the Trot of Turriff. On 15 May Ogilvy and other barons entered New Aberdeen with eight hundred horse, and took possession of the town, the Covenanters retreating. On the 22nd the barons left the town, and marched towards Strathbogie, where they learned of the proposed expedition of the northern Covenanters to join Montrose at Aberdeen. Deciding to bar their way, and, crossing the River Spey under the leadership of Ogilvy, they drew up on higher ground within two miles of Elgin. There was then a parley, and both parties agreed to lay down their arms.

On 30 May 1639 Ogilvy and others took ship at Macduff, Aberdeenshire, with the intention of sailing south to the king; but they meeting a ship carrying Aboyne and other royalists returning tnorth, and turned back. They landed on 6 June — Ogilvy being then prostrated by fever — at Aberdeen, where Aboyne proclaimed his lieutenancy in the north. Montrose having left Aberdeen for the south, the northern royalists had an opportunity of retaliation, and Ogilvy joined Aboyne and others in spoiling the Earl Marischal's lands.

About September 1639 Ogilvy went south to the king, and during his absence his palace at Banff and his country house at Inschedour were looted by the Covenanters under General Robert Monro. As part reparation, Charles I in 1641 presented to him six thousand merks Scots in gold. He was also by patent, dated at Nottingham 31 August 1642, created a peer of Scotland as Lord Banff.

== Later life ==
Banff was one of those who in 1644 accused James Hamilton, 1st Duke of Hamilton of treason. He died on 11 August 1663.

== Family ==
By his first wife, Margaret, daughter of Alexander Irvine of Drum, Aberdeenshire, Ogilvy had a daughter Helen, married to James Ogilvy, 2nd Earl of Airlie; and by his second wife, Janet, daughter of William Sutherland, 9th of Duffus, Elgin, he had a son George, the second Lord Banff, and two daughters.

== Notes ==
Attribution

This article incorporates text from a publication now in the public domain: Lee, Sidney, ed. (1895). "Ogilvy, George (d.1663)". Dictionary of National Biography. Vol. 42. London: Smith, Elder & Co.

Peerage of Scotland
New creation	Lord Banff; 1642–1663	Succeeded by George Ogilvy
Baronetage of Nova Scotia
New creation	Baronet (of Forglen); 1627–1663	Succeeded by George Ogilvy
