= Abercromby baronets =

Extinct baronetcy in the Baronetage of Nova Scotia

Abercromby baronets of Birkenbog
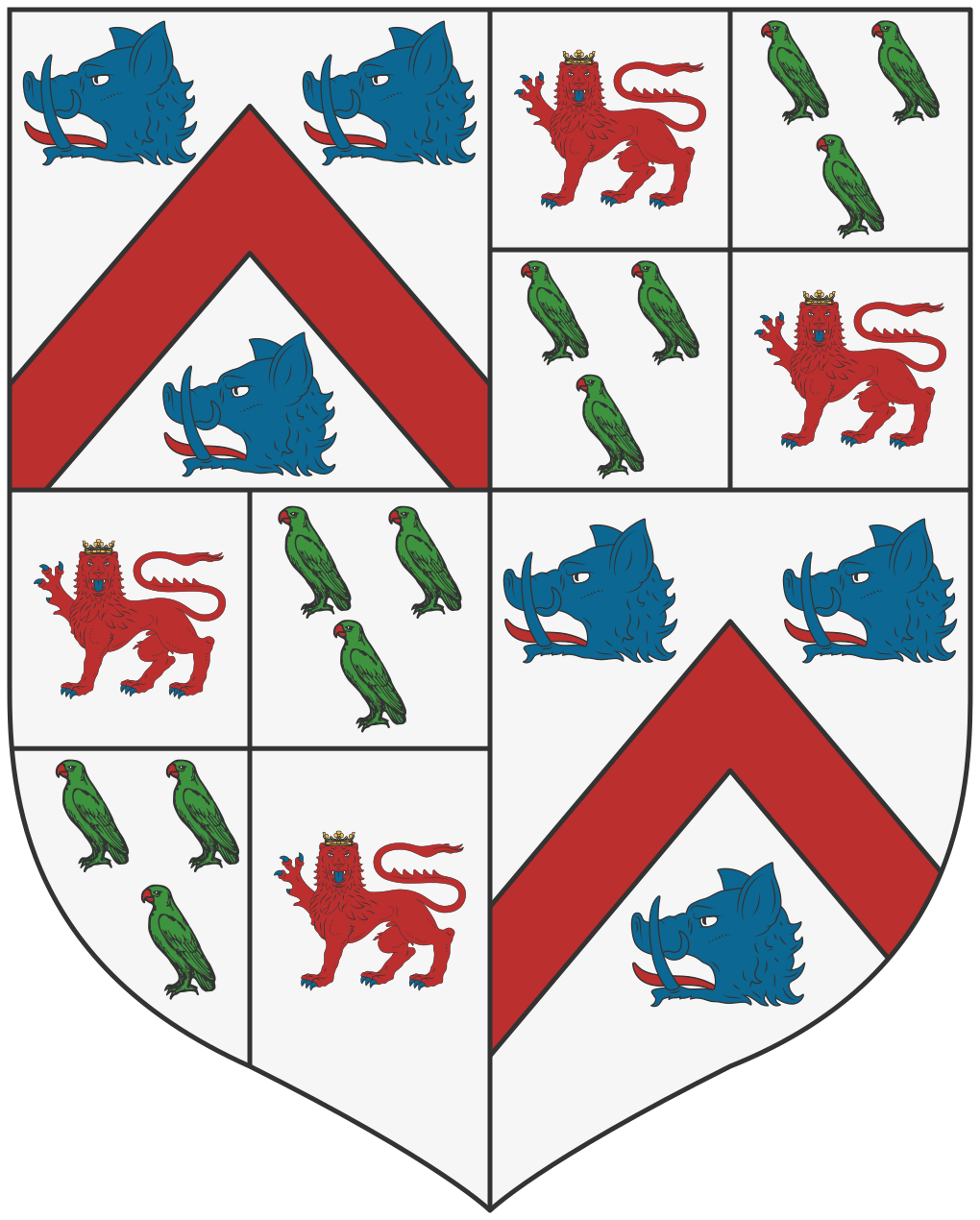
- Motto: above the crest: Petit alta (He seeks the heights) and below the shield: Mercie is my desire
- Arms: Quarterly, 1st and 4th, Argent a Chevron Gules between three Boars' Heads erased Azure langued of the second (Abercromby); 2nd and 3rd grand-quarters: 1st and 4th, Argent a Lion passant guardant Gules crowned with an Imperial Crown proper(Ogilvy); 2nd and 3rd, Argent three Popinjays Vert beaked and membered Gules (Pepdie)
- Crest: A Falcon rising belled proper
- Supporters: On either side a Greyhound Argent collared Gules

The Abercromby Baronetcy, of Birkenbog in the County of Banff, is a title that was created in the Baronetage of Nova Scotia on 20 February 1636 for Alexander Abercromby, who subsequently represented Banffshire in the Scottish Parliament. His eldest son, the second baronet, also represented Banffshire in parliament. The fourth baronet was sheriff of Nairnshire and Elginshire. The fifth baronet represented Banffshire in the British Parliament. The seventh baronet was vice-lord-lieutenant of Banffshire and a deputy lieutenant of Aberdeenshire and Banffshire. The eighth baronet was Lord-Lieutenant of Banffshire. The ninth baronet was vice-lord-lieutenant and a deputy lieutenant of Banffshire. The title became extinct on the death of the tenth Baronet in 2003.

Alexander Abercromby, third son of the first baronet, was the grandfather of Sir Ralph Abercromby, whose wife was created Baroness Abercromby in his honour, of Sir Robert Abercromby, and of Alexander Abercromby, Lord Abercromby.

== Abercromby baronets, of Birkenbog (1636) ==
- Sir Alexander Abercromby, 1st Baronet (1603–1670)
- Sir James Abercromby, 2nd Baronet (c. 1669–1734)
- Sir Robert Abercromby, 3rd Baronet (c. 1698–1787)
- Sir George Abercromby, 4th Baronet (1750–1831)
- Sir Robert Abercromby, 5th Baronet (1784–1855)
- Sir George Samuel Abercromby, 6th Baronet (1824–1872)
- Sir Robert John Abercromby, 7th Baronet (1850–1895)
- Sir George William Abercromby, 8th Baronet (1886–1964)
- Sir Robert Alexander Abercromby, 9th Baronet (1895–1972)
- Sir Ian George Abercromby, 10th Baronet (1925–2003)

== See also ==
- Baron Abercromby
- Abercrombie baronets
